= Samuel Falle =

British diplomat (1919–2014)

Sir Samuel Falle KCMG KCVO DSC (19 February 1919 – 20 February 2014) was a British diplomat and decorated Royal Navy officer. He served as Ambassador to Kuwait and Sweden, and High Commissioner to Singapore and Nigeria.

== Career ==
Falle was educated at Victoria College, Jersey. He served in the Royal Navy 1937–48 and was awarded the Distinguished Service Cross "for gallantry in the face of overwhelming odds whilst serving in HMS Encounter during her last action in the Java Sea on 1st March, 1942".

Encounter, a destroyer, had taken part in the Second Battle of the Java Sea, suffered major damage and was scuttled by her crew. They were subsequently rescued by the Imperial Japanese Navy destroyer Ikazuchi commanded by Shunsaku Kudō. Falle spent the next three and a half years as a prisoner of war.

Falle joined the Foreign Service in 1948 and served at Shiraz, Tehran, Beirut and Baghdad. He was Consul-General at Gothenburg 1961–63, head of the UN department at the Foreign Office 1963–67 and accompanied Lord Shackleton on a mission to Aden in 1967. He was deputy High Commissioner at Kuala Lumpur 1967–69, ambassador to Kuwait 1969–70, High Commissioner to Singapore 1970–74, ambassador to Sweden 1974–77, and High Commissioner to Nigeria 1977–78. He then retired from the Diplomatic Service and joined the European Commission, becoming EC delegate to Algeria 1979–82, then working as a consultant on development aid in Africa including evaluation of EEC aid to Zambia 1983–84, and Swedish aid to Swaziland in 1986.

Falle was appointed a Companion of the Order of St Michael and St George (CMG) in the 1964 Birthday Honours of 1964, appointed a Knight Commander of the Royal Victorian Order (KCVO) in 1972 and promoted to the additional knighthood of Knight Commander of the Order of St Michael and St George (KCMG) in the 1979 New Year Honours. The King of Sweden made him a Commander Grand Cross of the Order of the Polar Star in 1975.

Falle sought out the location of the grave of Shunsaku Kudō, to whom he held enormous gratitude for rescuing him during the Second Battle of the Java Sea, and visited there on 7 December 2008. Kudo was such a humble man that his family came to know of his deed for the first time when Falle visited them.

== Publications ==
- My Lucky Life : In War, Revolution, Peace and Diplomacy (autobiography), Book Guild, Lewes, 1996. ISBN 1857761219

Diplomatic posts
Preceded by Geoffrey Arthur	Ambassador Extraordinary and Plenipotentiary at Kuwait; 1969–1970	Succeeded by Sir John Wilton
Preceded by Sir Arthur de la Mare	High Commissioner to Singapore; 1970–1974	Succeeded by Peter Tripp
Preceded by Sir Guy Millard	Ambassador Extraordinary and Plenipotentiary at Stockholm; 1974–1977	Succeeded by Sir Jeffrey Petersen
Preceded by Sir Martin Le Quesne	High Commissioner to Nigeria; 1977–1978	Succeeded by Sir Mervyn Brown
