= Herbert Gybbon-Monypenny =

Herbert Reginald Dauphin Gybbon-Monypenny
- Born: 2 October 1895
- Died: 22 February 1988 (aged 92)
- Occupation: British diplomat

Herbert Reginald Dauphin Gybbon-Monypenny CBE (1895–1988) was a British diplomat.

== Biography ==
Born on 2 October 1895, Herbert Gybbon-Monypenny was educated at Bedford School. He entered the British Diplomatic Service and was Consul-General in Tunis, between 1943 and 1944, Oriental Counsellor at the British Embassy in Tehran, between 1944 and 1946, Consul-General in Frankfurt, between 1946 and 1951, Consul-General in Jerusalem, between 1951 and 1953, and British Ambassador to the Dominican Republic, between 1953 and 1955.

Herbert Gybbon-Monypenny was invested as a Commander of the Order of the British Empire in 1953. He retired from Her Majesty's Diplomatic Service in 1955 and died on 22 February 1988, aged 92.

Diplomatic posts
| Preceded by Sir Hugh Dow | Consul-General of the United Kingdom in Jerusalem; 1951–1953 | Succeeded by Andrew Charles Stewart |
| Preceded by Stanley Herbert Gudgeon | Ambassador from the United Kingdom to the Dominican Republic; 1953 – 1955 | Succeeded by Thomas Corney Ravensdale |
