= Donald Maitland =

British diplomat (1922–2010)

Sir Donald Maitland GCMG OBE

Permanent Representative of the United Kingdom to the United Nations
- In office 1973–1974
- Monarch: Elizabeth II
- Preceded by: Colin Crowe
- Succeeded by: Ivor Richard, Baron Richard

Downing Street Press Secretary
- In office 1970–1973
- Prime Minister: Edward Heath
- Preceded by: Joe Haines
- Succeeded by: Robin Haydon

Personal details
- Born: Donald James Dundas Maitland; 16 August 1922 Edinburgh, Scotland
- Died: 22 August 2010 (aged 88)
- Spouse: Jean Young (m. 1950)
- Children: 2
- Education: George Watson's College
- Alma mater: University of Edinburgh

Sir Donald James Dundas Maitland GCMG OBE (16 August 1922 – 22 August 2010) was a senior British diplomat. He served as British Prime Minister Edward Heath's press secretary 1970 to 1974.

== Early life ==
Donald was the son of Thomas Maitland. He was born in Edinburgh, Scotland, and educated at George Watson's College and the University of Edinburgh.

== Career ==
Maitland joined the Foreign Service in 1947.

After serving as Heath's press secretary, he was appointed as Permanent Representative of the United Kingdom to the United Nations.

Maitland's expertise was in the Middle East where he served during World War II and also served in Burma as an intelligence officer. Between 1956 and 1960 he was Director of the Middle East Centre for Arab Studies, Lebanon. In 1967 he became Principal Private Secretary to the Foreign Secretary and later Ambassador to Libya.

In June 1980 he was appointed Permanent Secretary at the Department of Energy, until his retirement from the civil service in December 1982.

He was appointed OBE in 1960, CMG in 1967, knighted in 1973 and appointed GCMG in 1977. In 1995, he was awarded an Honorary Degree (Doctor of Laws) by the University of Bath, and was their pro-chancellor from 1997 to 2000.

== Personal life ==
Maitland lived between Bath and Bradford on Avon. He married Jean Young in 1950, and had a son and a daughter.

Diplomatic posts
Preceded by Murray, The Lord MacLehose of Beoch	Principal Private Secretary to the Foreign Secretary; 1967–1969	Succeeded by Sir John Graham
Preceded by Sir Roderick Sarell	British Ambassador to Libya; 1969–1970	Succeeded by Peter Tripp
Preceded by Sir Colin Crowe	British Permanent Representative to the United Nations; 1973–1974	Succeeded by Ivor, The Lord Richard
Preceded by Sir Oliver Wright	Deputy Under-Secretary, Economic Affairs of the Foreign Office; 1974–1975	Succeeded by Sir Norman Statham
Government offices
Preceded by Joe Haines	Chief Press Secretary, Prime Minister's Office; 1970–1973	Succeeded by Robin Haydon
