= Wanstead High School =

Location
- Redbridge Lane West; Wanstead, Greater London, E11 2JZ; England; 51°34′32″N 0°02′10″E

Information
- Type: Community school
- Motto: "Abeunt Studia in Mores"
- Established: 1924
- Local authority: Redbridge
- Department for Education URN: 102851 Tables
- Ofsted: Reports
- Head teacher: Emma Hillman
- Age: 11 to 19
- Enrolment: 1532
- Website: http://www.wansteadhigh.co.uk/

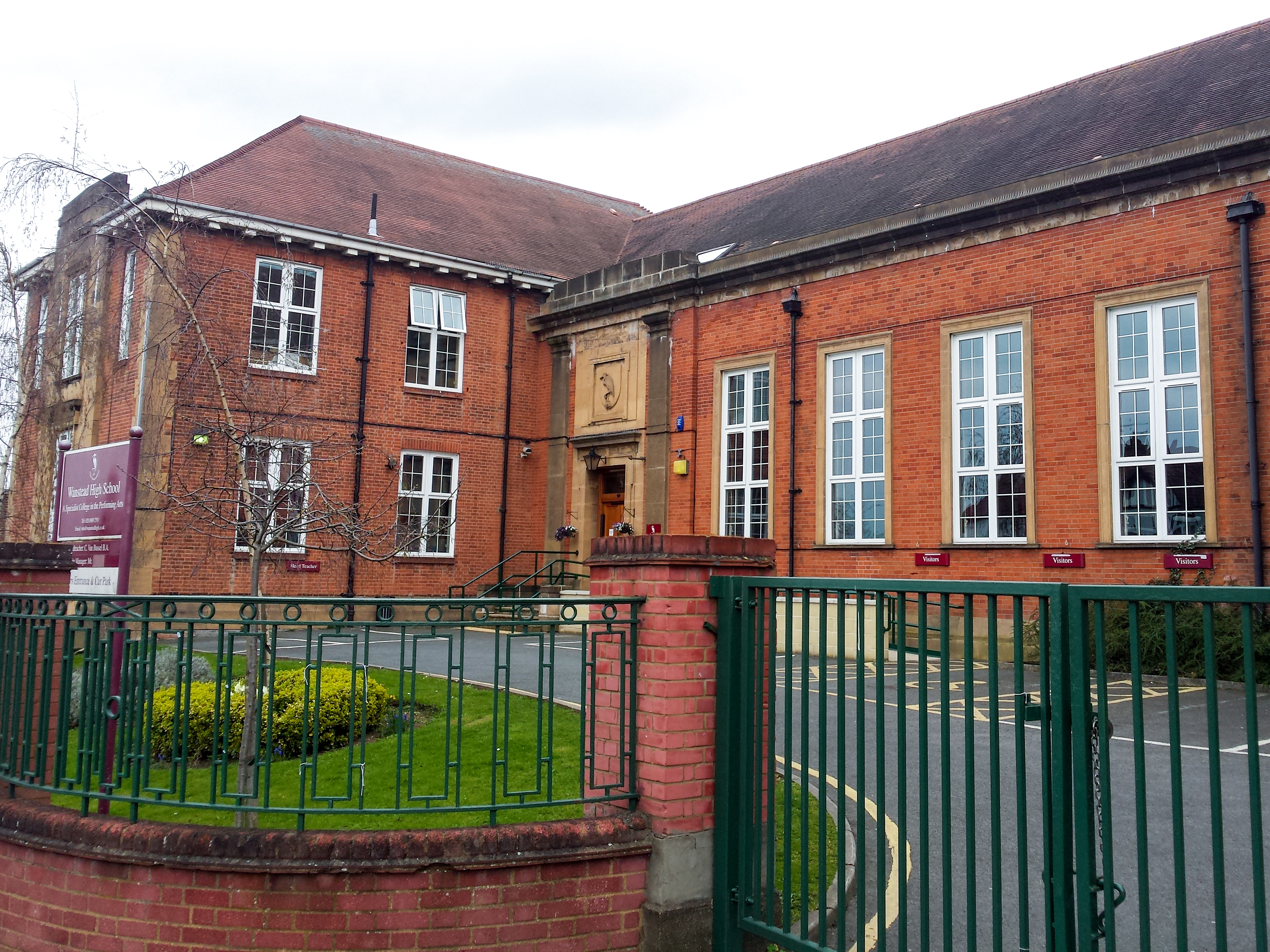
Wanstead High School in 2015

Wanstead High School (WHS), formerly Wanstead County High School, is a co-educational, non-denominational, comprehensive secondary school in Wanstead, London, United Kingdom.

== Admissions ==
It specialises in the performing arts and has 1532 pupils aged 11 to 19. Its local education authority is Redbridge. It is situated just west of the A12 junction with the North Circular Road (A406).

== Traditions ==
Its motto is "Abeunt Studia in Mores" which translates literally as "studies become habits" or "practices zealously pursued pass into habits". It can be taken to mean "Studies build one's character".

Its symbol is the heron, a bird traditionally associated with the area. Its alumni are known as "Old Heronians".

Its uniform colour is burgundy, having previously been black, and the school uniform must be worn by all pupils except the sixth form, where students are required to dress formally.

== History ==
Wanstead County High school opened in 1924 as a mixed Grammar school. It was one of the first co-educational secondary schools in England. The site had previously been a rectory.

During the Second World War, the school was evacuated to Newent. On 15 February 1957, over 150 pupils suffered food poisoning. Until 1965 it was administered by the Essex Education Committee. In the 1960s, the school had around 800 boys and girls, with 250 in the sixth form.

The school buildings were extended in 1964 and again in 1974 when the science and humanities block was built.

In 2013, the school received a "Requires Improvement" rating from Ofsted. The report stated that 'Achievement is not yet good. Students are not making good enough progress in a number of subjects including modern foreign languages, business studies and geography.'

In 2025, the school received a "Good" rating from Ofsted. The report stated that 'The school has worked well to ensure that the quality of education is effective, and pupils’ behaviour is strong. Pupils feel safe and enjoy coming to school. Sixth-form students exhibit exceptionally strong, mature attitudes to their education.'

== Performing arts facilities ==
Performing arts facilities at the school include a theatre, drama and dance studios and music technology suites. In addition to allowing pupils to study these areas specifically, performance elements are also being introduced into other areas of the wider curriculum. Ian Sweet and Rebecca Grace are the current heads of performing arts at the school.

== Notable former pupils ==
- Geraldine Bedell, journalist and writer
- Nick Berry, television actor and musician
- Dennis Cirkin, footballer
- Adrian Cohen, Senior Vice-President of the Board of Deputies of British Jews
- Carly Cole (née Zucker), wife of footballer Joe Cole
- Jonathan Fortune, footballer
- Sarah Holland, writer
- Gillian Merron, Baroness, and member of the House of Lords, former Labour MP and junior minister, Chief Executive of Board of Deputies of British Jews
- Leanne Mohamad, public speaker and activist
- Ronnie O'Sullivan, snooker player
- Kayne Ramsay, footballer
- Frances Ruffelle, actress
- Richard Wisker, star of CBBC's children's comedy drama Tracy Beaker Returns.
- Bilal Zafar, comedian

=== Wanstead County High School ===
- Robert Atwell, Anglican Bishop of Exeter
- Michael Coren, journalist
- Rupert Davies, film, TV, and stage actor, best known as Maigret in the 1960s TV series
- Geoff Elliott, Olympic pole-vaulter and decathlete (Helsinki, 1952)
- Brian Moll, actor
- Keith Ovenden, writer
- Geoffrey Pardoe, aerodynamicist and rocket scientist, Director from 1993 to 1996 of the International Academy of Science, Project Manager from 1956 to 1960 of Blue Streak, President from 1984 to 1985 of the Royal Aeronautical Society, and advocate of the British space programme
- David Rappaport, musician, stage, screen and TV actor (Time Bandits, The Wizard).
- Liz Robertson, actress
- Tony Robinson, actor, comedian, author, television presenter and political activist
- Maurice Tucker, professor of geological sciences since 1993 at Durham University and previous Master of University College, Durham
- Angela Watkinson, Conservative MP Upminster 2001-2010 and Hornchurch and Upminster 2010-2017
- John Wilton, major (Royal Ulster Rifles), ambassador to Kuwait from 1970 to 1974, and to Saudi Arabia from 1976 to 1979
- Donna-Maria Maynard (née Bradshaw), Professor of Psychology since 2019 at the University of the West Indies

=== Notable former teachers ===
- Wilf Paish (physical education teacher in the 60s. Coach of many athletes, including Olympic gold medal winner Tessa Sanderson)
- Ron Pickering (left in 1961 when he became athletics coach for Wales and the West of England)

== See also ==
- List of schools in the London Borough of Redbridge

== Sources ==
- The Times, 12 January 1996
