= Roderick Sarell =

British diplomat

Sir Roderick Sarell KCMG (23 January 1913 – 15 August 2001) was a British diplomat who was ambassador to Libya and Turkey.

== Career ==
Roderick Francis Gisbert Sarell was educated at Radley College and Magdalen College, Oxford. He joined the Diplomatic Service in 1936 and served in Iran, Ethiopia, Iraq, Italy, Romania, Burma and Algeria before being appointed to be Ambassador to Libya 1964–69 and to Turkey 1969–73.

Diplomatic posts
Preceded by Andrew Stewart	British Ambassador to Libya; 1964–1969	Succeeded by Donald Maitland
Preceded by Sir Roger Allen	British Ambassador to Turkey; 1969–1973	Succeeded by Horace Phillips
