= Richard Northern =

- Born: 2 November 1954 (age 70)
- Occupation: British diplomat

Richard James Northern MBE (born 2 November 1954) is a former British diplomat.

== Biography ==
Born on 2 November 1954, Richard Northern was educated at Bedford School and at Jesus College, Cambridge. He joined the British Diplomatic Service in 1976 and, following diplomatic postings in Lebanon, Saudi Arabia, Italy and Canada, he served as British Ambassador to Libya between 2010 and 2011, when the British Embassy in Tripoli was closed due to the Libyan Civil War.

In March 2011, A conversation purportedly between Richard Northern and a spokesman for Mustafa Abdul Jalil, the former Libyan Justice Minister who subsequently became Chairman of the rebel National Transitional Council in Benghazi, was intercepted and broadcast on Libyan state television.

Since December 2011 Richard Northern has been a Consultant, advising clients on business in the Middle East and Africa. He contributed a chapter to the book 'The 2011 Libyan Uprisings and the Struggle for the Post-Qadhafi Future' published by Palgrave Macmillan in 2013.

Diplomatic posts
Preceded by Vincent Fean	British Ambassador to Libya; 2010-2011	Succeeded by Sir John Jenkins
