= Fean =

Fean is a surname. Notable people with the name include:

- Johnny Fean (1951–2023), member of Irish trad rock band Horslips
- Vincent Fean (born 1952), British diplomat
