= Archie Lamb =

British diplomat (1921–2021)

Sir Archie Lamb KBE, CMG, DFC

British Ambassador to Norway
- In office 1978–1980
- Monarch: Elizabeth II
- Prime Minister: James Callaghan; Margaret Thatcher
- Preceded by: Peter Scott
- Succeeded by: Dame Gillian Brown

British Ambassador to Kuwait
- In office 1974–1977
- Monarch: Elizabeth II
- Prime Minister: Harold Wilson; James Callaghan
- Preceded by: Sir John Wilton
- Succeeded by: Sydney Cambridge

Personal details
- Born: Albert Thomas Lamb; 23 October 1921 Swansea, Wales
- Died: 19 October 2021 (aged 99)
- Education: Bishop Gore School
- Profession: Diplomat

Military service
- Allegiance: United Kingdom
- Branch/service: Royal Air Force
- Years of service: 1941–1946
- Rank: Flight Lieutenant
- Battles/wars: Second World War
- Awards: Distinguished Flying Cross

Sir Albert Thomas "Archie" Lamb KBE CMG DFC (23 October 1921 – 19 October 2021) was a British diplomat, writer and RAF fighter pilot. He served as British ambassador to Kuwait from 1974 to 1977, and to Norway from 1978 to 1980.

== Career ==
Albert Thomas Lamb was born in Britain on 23 October 1921, the son of R. S. Lamb and Violet Lamb (née Haynes). He was educated in Swansea at the Bishop Gore School. He joined the Foreign Office in 1938.

On the outbreak of World War II in 1939 he volunteered for the Royal Air Force, but was not called for service until 1941. He did pilot training in Southern Rhodesia; on his way back to Britain in SS Oronsay his ship was torpedoed and he spent nine days in a lifeboat before being rescued. Commissioned in 1941, he was promoted to flying officer (war-substantive) on 12 March 1943, and to flight lieutenant (war-substantive) on 12 September 1944. He flew combat missions in Hurricanes and Typhoons and was awarded the Distinguished Flying Cross (DFC) in January 1945.

After the war Lamb returned to the Foreign Office and served at Rome, Genoa and Bucharest. He then studied Arabic at the Middle East Centre for Arabic Studies 1955–57 and subsequently served in Bahrain, as consul in Kuwait and as political agent in Abu Dhabi in 1965–68, during which time he oversaw the 1966 Dhabyani coup d'état. He served at the Foreign Office (later the Foreign and Commonwealth Office) 1965–74, rising to assistant under-secretary, before being appointed ambassador to Kuwait 1974–77 and to Norway 1978–80. Lamb found the Norwegian political establishment insular and unsympathetic to their NATO partners, who at the height of the Cold War, were concerned about Norway's vulnerable border with the Soviet Union. In his last diplomatic dispatch, Lamb says of the Norwegians "...you demand your allies' full support but restrict their ability to give it... 'All for Norway' is the Royal motto of the King of Norway; it sums up the Norwegian interpretation of the North Atlantic Alliance".

After retiring from the Diplomatic Service, he became a director of the nationalised companies British National Oil Corporation, later privatised as Britoil, and British Shipbuilders.

== Personal life ==
His daughter Kathryn Lamb is a cartoonist, illustrator and writer.

He died on 19 October 2021, four days before his 100th birthday.

== Publications ==
- A Long Way from Swansea: a memoir, 2003. Starborn Books. ISBN 1899530134
- Abu Dhabi 1965–1968, 2003 Teapot Press.
- The Last Voyage of SS Oronsay: A Questionable Venture, 2004 Starborn Books. ISBN 1899530185

== Honours ==
Lamb was appointed MBE in 1953, CMG in 1974 and knighted KBE in the Queen's Birthday Honours of 1979. He was made an honorary fellow of Swansea Metropolitan University in 2004.

Diplomatic posts
Preceded by Sir John Wilton	Ambassador Extraordinary and Plenipotentiary at Kuwait; 1974–1977	Succeeded by Sydney Cambridge
Preceded by Sir Peter Scott	Ambassador Extraordinary and Plenipotentiary to Norway; 1978–1980	Succeeded by Dame Gillian Brown
