= Shunsaku =

- Gender: Male

Origin
- Origin: Japanese
- Meaning: Different meanings depending on the kanji used

Shunsaku (written: 俊作) is a masculine Japanese given name. Notable people with the name include:

- Shunsaku Kudō (工藤 俊作) (1901–1979), Imperial Japanese Navy officer
- Shunsaku Okuda (奥田 俊作) (born 1971), Japanese musician
