= Jeffrey Charles Petersen =

British diplomat

Sir Jeffrey Charles Petersen KCMG (20 July 1920 - 14 October 2006) was a British diplomat. He served as Ambassador to Sweden, Romania and South Korea.

== Early life ==
Petersen was born in London in 1920. His school career was considered "undistinguished" and he was not considered "university material". Following time in the Royal Naval Reserve he joined the Royal Navy at the beginning of World War II, where he served on HMS Snapdragon on convoy duty in the North Atlantic, and as a Liaison Officer in Cairo.

He left the Royal Navy in 1946 and studied Politics, Philosophy and Economics at the London School of Economics before joining the civil service in 1947.

== Diplomatic career ==
Petersen served in the British diplomatic service in Madrid, Ankara, Brussels and Jakarta. During the Indonesia–Malaysia confrontation he was responsible for evacuating the British Embassy in Jakarta, which was later burned by rioters. Petersen was then promoted to Commercial Counsellor in Athens and then to Minister (Commercial) in Rio de Janeiro, where he was involved in the negotiation of a commercial loan for the construction of the Rio–Niterói Bridge.

Petersen was appointed British Ambassador and Consul General to Seoul in September 1971. He was then appointed British Ambassador to Romania in 1975. and Ambassador to Sweden in 1977, retiring in 1980. In these roles he continued to promote commercial interests, including British technology for the South Korean car industry, British BAC One-Eleven aircraft for the Romanian flag carrier TAROM and encouragement of Swedish inward investment. After retirement he served as Chairman of Barclays Bank SAE in Spain and of the British Materials Handling Board.

He was President of the Anglo-Swedish Society from 1988 to 1994.

== Personal life and death ==
Petersen was married, firstly, to Catherine (Kate) Bayly, divorcing in 1959, and then to Karin Hayward in 1961. He had two children from his first marriage and four from his second.

His hobbies were listed in Who's Who as painting, sailing, butterfly collecting and totting, and his gravestone in Petham, Canterbury records him as "diplomat, painter and lover of butterflies".

== Honours ==
Petersen was appointed a Companion of the Order of St Michael and St George (CMG) in the 1968 Birthday Honours while serving as Commercial Counsellor in the British Embassy in Athens, and promoted to Knight Commander of the Order (KCMG) in the 1978 Birthday Honours.

Diplomatic posts
Preceded by Nigel Trench	Ambassador Extraordinary and Plenipotentiary to South Korea; 1971–1974	Succeeded by William Bates
Preceded by Derick Ashe	Ambassador Extraordinary and Plenipotentiary to Romania; 1975–1977	Succeeded by Reginald Secondé
Preceded by Sir Samuel Falle	Ambassador Extraordinary and Plenipotentiary at Stockholm; 1977–1980	Succeeded by Donald Murray
