= Martin Reynolds (civil servant) =

British civil servant and diplomat (born 1969)

Martin Reynolds CB CMG
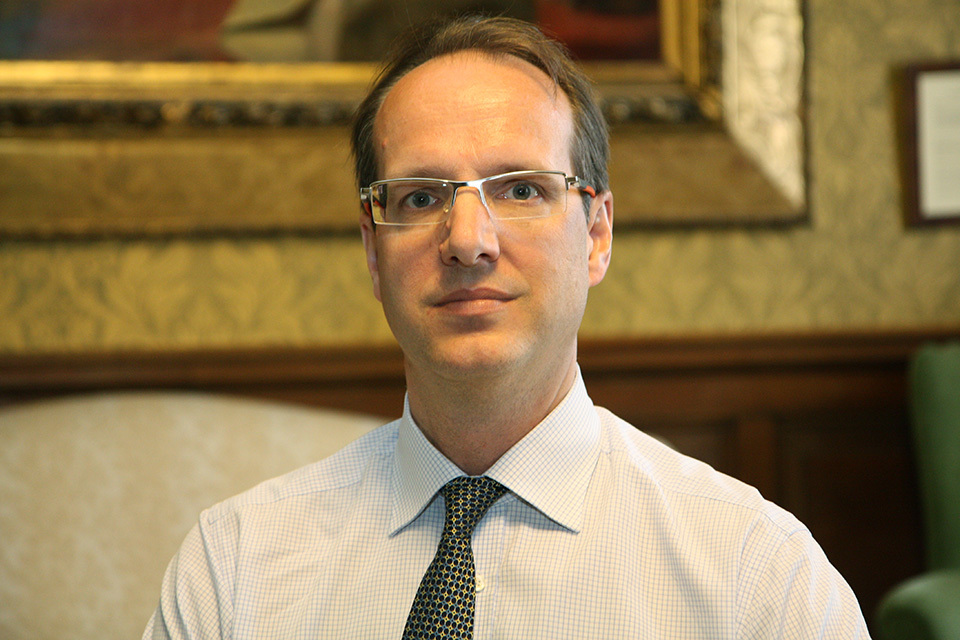

Principal Private Secretary to the Prime Minister
- In office 1 October 2019 – 3 February 2022
- Prime Minister: Boris Johnson
- Preceded by: Peter Hill
- Succeeded by: Peter Wilson

British Ambassador to Libya
- In office April 2019 – September 2019
- Monarch: Elizabeth II
- Prime Minister: Theresa May; Boris Johnson
- Preceded by: Frank Baker
- Succeeded by: Nicholas Hopton

Principal Private Secretary to the Secretary of State for Foreign and Commonwealth Affairs
- In office December 2014 – January 2018
- Prime Minister: David Cameron; Theresa May
- Sec. of State: Philip Hammond; Boris Johnson; Jeremy Hunt
- Preceded by: Thomas Drew
- Succeeded by: Jonathan Sinclair

Personal details
- Born: Oxford, England
- Education: Gonville and Caius College, Cambridge

Martin Alexander Baillie Reynolds CB CMG is a British civil servant who served as Principal Private Secretary to Prime Minister Boris Johnson from 2019 to 2022. Reynolds previously served as British Ambassador to Libya under Prime Minister Theresa May and as the principal private secretary to Johnson when he served as Foreign Secretary in May's government.

== Early life ==
Reynolds was born in Oxford, England. He was educated at Magdalen College School, Oxford, and Gonville and Caius College, Cambridge, where he gained an undergraduate degree in law.

== Career ==
Before entering government, Reynolds worked as a lawyer in London. From 1997, he worked at the Foreign and Commonwealth Office.

Becoming a diplomat, Reynolds served at the British High Commission in Pretoria, South Africa as Deputy High Commissioner between July 2011 and November 2014.

From December 2014 to January 2018, he was Principal Private Secretary to the Secretary of State for Foreign and Commonwealth Affairs, for part of that time while Boris Johnson was Foreign Secretary.

Reynolds was Ambassador of the United Kingdom to Libya for five months between April and September 2019. In July 2019, Johnson became prime minister, and Peter Hill resigned as Principal Private Secretary to the Prime Minister. Reynolds was recalled from his overseas posting and took up that post at 10 Downing Street in October 2019.

=== 2020 lockdown party email ===
On 10 January 2022, an image leaked to ITV News purported to show an email sent by Reynolds on 20 May 2020 inviting those at 10 Downing Street to "make the most of the lovely weather and have some socially distanced drinks" in the garden. Invitees were asked to "bring your own booze". It was reported that over 100 people were invited to this gathering, and between thirty and forty people attended. Campaigners including the Covid-19 Bereaved Families for Justice group called for Reynolds to be dismissed. As a result, Reynolds was nicknamed 'party Marty' in Whitehall and the UK press.

On 3 February 2022 he resigned as Principal Private Secretary to the Prime Minister, but was expected to remain in place until a successor had been found. On 8 March 2022, Reynolds was succeeded by Peter Wilson.

In May 2022, following the release of the investigation final report by Sue Gray, it was revealed that Reynolds had boasted he had "got away with" rule-breaking at a "bring-your-own-booze" party in May 2020. In a fragment of a message to a special adviser, he had said: "Best of luck - a complete non-story but better than them focusing on our drinks (which we seem to have got away with)." Reynolds' name was mentioned 24 times in the report.

There were no formal penalties for Martin and he continued to work for the civil service, despite his misconduct in public office and breaches of the civil service code of conduct.

In the 2023 Channel 4 docudrama Partygate, he was played by Edwin Flay.

== Honours ==
Reynolds was appointed a Companion of the Order of St Michael and St George (CMG) in the 2018 Birthday Honours, for services to British foreign policy. He was additionally appointed a Companion of the Order of the Bath (CB) in the 2022 Prime Minister's Resignation Honours.

== See also ==
- Prime Minister's Office

Government offices
| Preceded by Thomas Drew | Principal Private Secretary to the Foreign Secretary; 2014–2018 | Succeeded by Jonathan Sinclair |
| Preceded by Peter Hill | Principal Private Secretary to the Prime Minister; 2019–2022 | Succeeded by Peter Wilson |
Diplomatic posts
| Preceded by Frank Baker | British Ambassador to Libya; 2019 | Succeeded by Nicholas Hopton |
