= Simon Collis =

British diplomat

His Excellency Simon Collis CMG
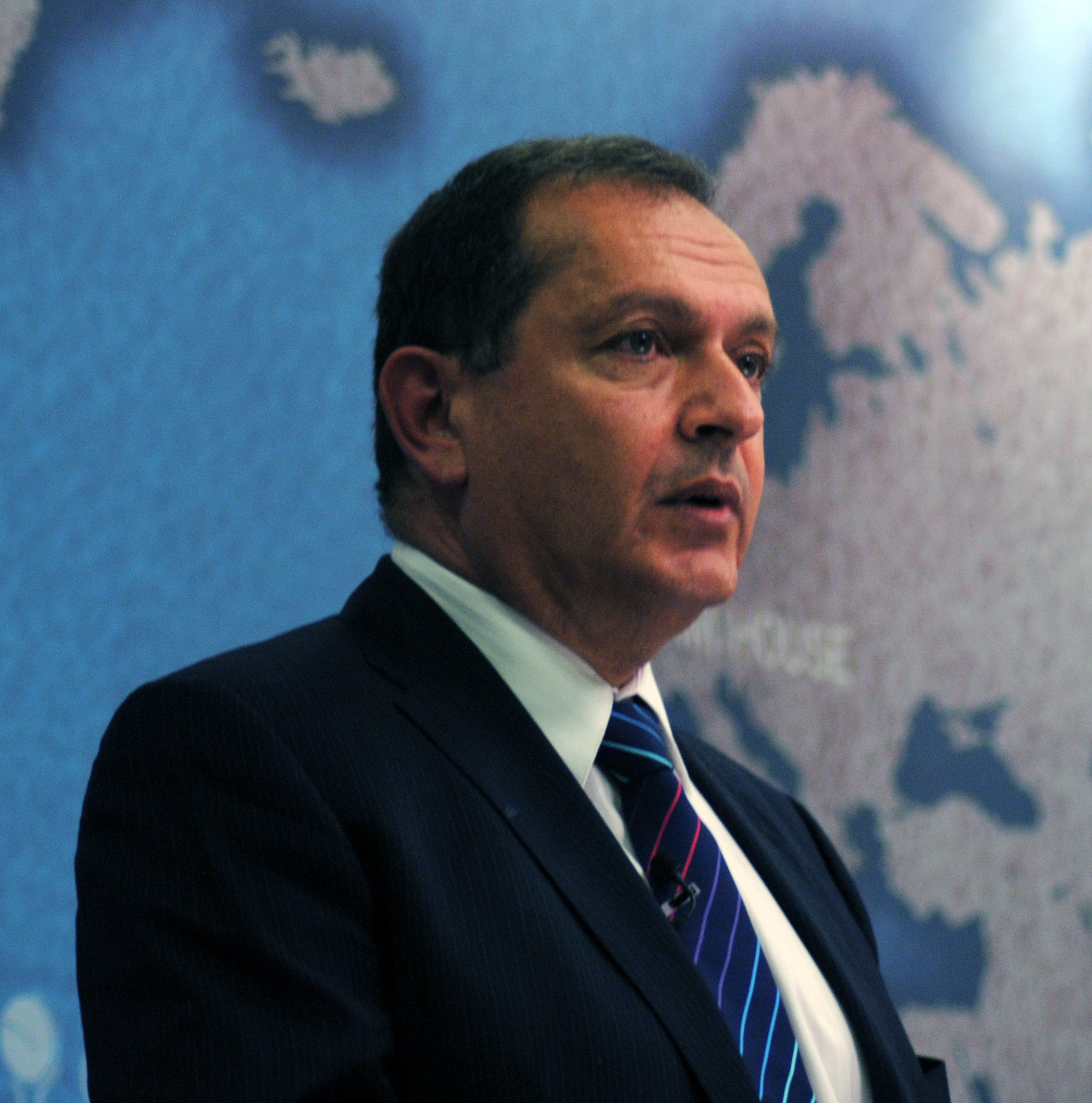
- Collis at Chatham House in 2013

British Ambassador to Saudi Arabia
- In office 2015–2020
- Monarch: Elizabeth II
- Prime Minister: David Cameron; Theresa May; Boris Johnson
- Preceded by: Sir John Jenkins
- Succeeded by: Neil Crompton

British Ambassador to Iraq
- In office 2012–2014
- Monarch: Elizabeth II
- Prime Minister: David Cameron
- Preceded by: Michael Aron
- Succeeded by: Frank Baker

British Ambassador to Syria
- In office 2007–2012
- Monarch: Elizabeth II
- Prime Minister: Tony Blair; Gordon Brown; David Cameron
- Preceded by: John Jenkins
- Succeeded by: Embassy closed

British Ambassador to Qatar
- In office 2005–2007
- Monarch: Elizabeth II
- Prime Minister: Tony Blair
- Preceded by: David MacLennan
- Succeeded by: Roderick Drummond (Chargé d'Affaires)

Personal details
- Born: 23 February 1956 (age 70)
- Spouse: Huda Mujarkech (m. 2011)
- Children: 5
- Education: King Edward VII School, Sheffield
- Alma mater: Christ's College, Cambridge

Simon Paul Collis, CMG (23 February 1956) is a former British ambassador to several Middle Eastern countries before retiring from diplomatic service in February 2020.

== Biography ==
Collis was educated at King Edward VII School, Sheffield, from 1967 until 1973 and at Christ's College, Cambridge.

He joined Her Majesty's Diplomatic Service in 1978 and served his first posting as Second Secretary in Bahrain from 1981 to 1984. From 1984– 1986 he served as Middle East Spokesman in the News Department of the Foreign and Commonwealth Office. In 1986 he temporarily served at the UK mission in New York. From 1987 to 1988 he was Head of India Section in the South Asia Department. From 1988 to 1990 he was Deputy Head of Mission in Tunis. From 1990 to 1991 he was in the Gulf War Emergency Unit. From 1991 to 1994 he served as First Secretary in New Delhi, India. From 1994 to 1996 he was Deputy Head of the Near East & North Africa Department. From 1996 to 1999 he was Deputy Head of Mission in Amman, Jordan. From 1999 to 2000 he was seconded to BP. From 2000 to 2004 he was Consul-General in Dubai, United Arab Emirates.

He was Consul General in Basra between 2004 and 2005. He was British Ambassador to Qatar 2005–07, and British Ambassador to Syria 2007–2012. He left Syria in February 2012, after the British Government withdrew their staff there. He was British Ambassador to Iraq from 2012 until September 2014. He presented his credentials as British Ambassador to Saudi Arabia on 3 February 2015.

Collis was appointed Companion of the Order of St Michael and St George (CMG) in the 2014 Birthday Honours for services to British interests in Iraq and Syria.

In 2016, Collis became the first UK ambassador to perform the Islamic pilgrimage of Hajj after converting to Islam.

In 2020, Collis retired as ambassador to Saudi Arabia and from diplomatic service.

After leaving the diplomatic service, Collis took on roles at FMA, a consultancy founded by Francis Maude and Simone Finn; and at Sovereign Strategy, a political consulting and PR firm.

== Notes ==
Diplomatic posts
Preceded by David MacLennan	British Ambassador to Qatar; 2005–2007	Succeeded by Roderick Drummond
Preceded by John Jenkins	British Ambassador to Syria; 2007–2012	Embassy closed
Preceded by Michael Aron	British Ambassador to Iraq; 2012–2014	Succeeded by Frank Baker
Preceded by Sir John Jenkins	British Ambassador to Saudi Arabia; 2015–2020	Succeeded by Neil Crompton
