= List of ambassadors of the United Kingdom to Turkey =

Ambassador of the United Kingdom to the Republic of Turkey Birleşik Krallık'ın Türkiye Büyükelçisi
- Coat of arms of the United Kingdom
- Residence: Ankara
- Appointer: King Charles III
- Inaugural holder: Sir Ronald Lindsay
- Formation: 1925 (First Ambassador after foundation of Turkish Republic)
- Website: British Embassy Ankara

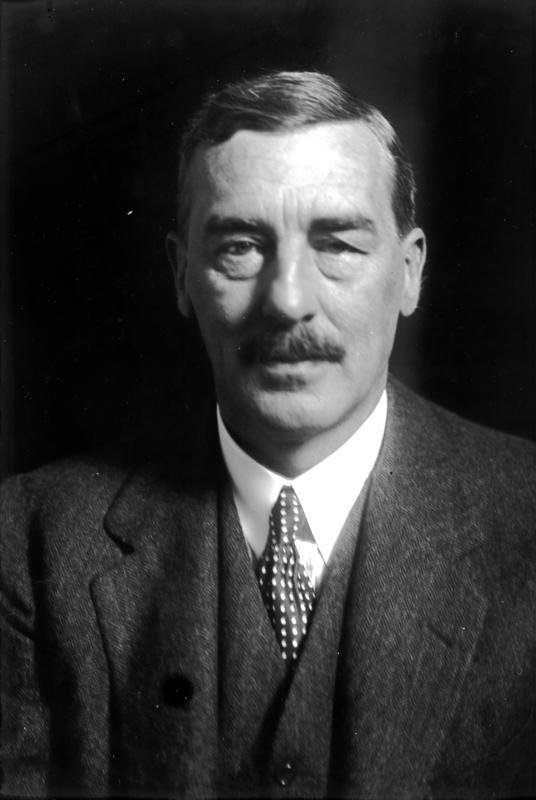
Sir Ronald Lindsay was the British ambassador to Turkey from 1925 to 1926

The ambassador of the United Kingdom to Turkey is the United Kingdom's foremost diplomatic representative to the Republic of Turkey, and head of the UK's diplomatic mission in Ankara. The official title is His Britannic Majesty's Ambassador to the Republic of Turkey.

Besides the embassy in Ankara, the United Kingdom also maintains a consulate general in Istanbul.

== List of heads of mission ==
=== Ambassadors to Turkey ===
For the period up to foundation of the Turkish Republic, see List of Ambassadors from the United Kingdom to the Ottoman Empire.

- 1923–1924: Sir Horace Rumbold, 9th Baronet (1920–1923: British High Commissioner at Constantinople)
- 1925–1926: Sir Ronald Lindsay
- 1926–1933: Sir George Clerk
- 1933–1939: Sir Percy Loraine, 12th Baronet
- 1939–1944: Sir Hughe Knatchbull-Hugessen
- 1944–1946: Sir Maurice Peterson
- 1946–1949: Sir David Kelly
- 1949–1951: Sir Noel Charles
- 1951–1954: Sir Knox Helm
- 1954–1958: Sir James Bowker
- 1958–1962: Sir Bernard Burrows
- 1963–1967: Sir Denis Allen
- 1967–1969: Sir Roger Allen
- 1969–1972: Sir Roderick Sarell
- 1973–1977: Sir Horace Phillips
- 1977–1980: Sir Derek Dodson
- 1980–1983: Sir Peter Laurence
- 1983–1986: Sir Mark Russell
- 1986–1992: Sir Timothy Daunt
- 1992–1995: John Goulden
- 1995–1997: Sir Kieran Prendergast
- 1997–2001: Sir David Logan
- 2002–2006: Sir Peter Westmacott
- 2006–2009: Nick Baird
- 2009–2014: Sir David Reddaway
- 2014–2017: Sir Richard Moore
- 2018–2022: Sir Dominick Chilcott
- 2023–2026: Jill Morris
- 2026–present: Jennifer Anderson
