= Peter Laurence (diplomat) =

British diplomat (1923–2007)

Sir Peter Laurence KCMG MC

British Ambassador to Turkey
- In office 1980–1983
- Preceded by: Sir Derek Dodson
- Succeeded by: Sir Mark Russell

Personal details
- Born: 18 February 1923 Worcestershire
- Died: 26 November 2007 (aged 84)
- Children: 2
- Education: Christ Church, Oxford
- Occupation: Diplomat

Sir Peter Harold Laurence (18 February 1923 – 26 November 2007) was a British diplomat who served as Ambassador to Turkey from 1980 to 1983.

== Early life and education ==
Laurence was born on 18 February 1923 in Worcestershire, the son of the Venerable George Laurence, archdeacon of Lahore and Alice née Jackson. He was educated at Radley College and Christ Church, Oxford.

== Career ==
Laurence served during World War II with the 60th Rifles rising to Major, and was awarded the Military Cross in 1944 for bravery in the Italian campaign. He then entered the Foreign Service in 1948 and worked for two years at the Foreign Office. In 1950, he was posted to Athens for three years, followed by a similar term at Trieste as assistant political adviser. He then served from 1955 to 1957 as first secretary at the Foreign Office in the Levant department; at Prague as consul for the Czechoslovak Republic from 1957 to 1960; and Cairo from 1960 to 1962.

Laurence then returned to the Foreign Office where he served from 1962 to 1965 in the North and East African department, and then from 1965 to 1967 in the personnel department of the Diplomatic Service Administration Office. He was political adviser, counsellor and head of Chancery in the British Sector in Berlin from 1967 to 1969 and there worked closely with successive British Commander-in-Chiefs, and after a year's sabbatical as a visiting fellow at All Souls College, Oxford, he was transferred to Paris where served as commercial counsellor from 1970 to 1974. He then served as assistant Under-Secretary for Foreign and Commonwealth Affairs and chief inspector of embassies from 1974 to 1978.

In 1980, he was appointed Ambassador to Turkey, arriving as a coup brought Turkish generals to power. Fortunately, he enjoyed good relations with the Turkish Foreign Minister. He remained in the post until his retirement from the Diplomatic Service in 1983.

== Personal life and death ==
Laurence married in 1948 Elizabeth Way whom he met while studying at Oxford, and they had two sons. In retirement, Laurence was a member of the Council of the University of Exeter from 1989 to 1999, and chairman of the governors of Grenville College, Bideford between 1988 and 1995.

Laurence died on November 26, 2007, aged 84.

== Honours ==
Laurence was appointed Companion of the Order of St Michael and St George (CMG) in the 1976 New Years Honours, and was promoted to Knight Commander (KCMG) in the 1981 Birthday Honours. In 1944, he was awarded the Military Cross (MC).

Diplomatic posts
Preceded by Sir Derek Dodson	British Ambassador to Turkey; 1980–1983	Succeeded by Sir Mark Russell
