= Leanne Mohamad =

British-Palestinian activist (born 2000)

- Born: September 2000 (age 25); Ilford, London, England
- Education: Wanstead High School; Beal Sixth Form
- Alma mater: King's College London
- Occupations: Public speaker; activist
- Known for: Candidacy in the 2024 United Kingdom general election
- Political party: Independent (since 2023)
- Other political affiliations: Labour (until 2023)

Leanne Mohamad (born September 2000) is a British-Palestinian activist who stood as an independent candidate in the 2024 United Kingdom general election against Wes Streeting, the Labour Party incumbent and defence secretary, in the constituency of Ilford North. She stood for election in protest against Labour's stance on the war and humanitarian crisis in Gaza.

Although Mohamad was not elected to parliament, Streeting's unexpectedly narrow margin of victory provoked media and political attention, especially in the context of the victory at the general election of several other independent candidates who stood on platforms critical of Labour's response to the war in Gaza.

== Early life and education ==
Leanne Mohamad was born in September 2000 in Ilford, East London, and raised by Palestinian parents.

In 2016, while a 15-year-old student at Wanstead High School, Mohamad gave a speech on the plight faced by Palestinians as part of the Jack Petchey Foundation's "Speak Out" Challenge. She won the Redbridge borough final, but faced online harassment and false accusations of blood libel after a video of her speech was published online. In response, the foundation's Speakers Trust briefly removed the video from their YouTube channel citing safeguarding concerns, before reinstating it after consulting with her family. Wes Streeting, in his capacity as the local member of Parliament for Ilford North, condemned the abuse and argued that her speech could not be considered antisemitic. She studied her A levels at Beal High School Sixth Form and then progressed to university at King's College London.

== 2024 general election ==
Ilford North, the constituency in which Mohamad stood for election to Parliament in 2024

Following the start of the Gaza war and humanitarian crisis in October 2023, Mohamad gave up her membership of the Labour Party in protest at comments made by Labour leader Keir Starmer that Israel had the right to cut off power and water supplies to the Gaza Strip.

In January 2024, Mohamad was selected by the Redbridge Community Action Group (RCAG) to stand as a prospective independent candidate against Streeting in Ilford North for the upcoming general election. Her selection followed local controversy and backlash regarding Streeting's response to the conflict, as well as wider criticism of Starmer's previous comments on Israel and Gaza. While Mohamad split from RCAG in April as a result of internal disputes, the group continued to endorse her.

Mohamad's campaign was endorsed, along with many other independent candidates, by the pressure group The Muslim Vote. Her campaign received significant media coverage, and was mentioned in the context of disillusionment with the Labour Party among British Muslims. Her campaign also focused on issues such as the National Health Service (NHS), housing, and improving access to public services.

At the general election, held on 4 July, Streeting was re-elected with a narrow majority of 528 (1.1 per cent of votes cast) ahead of Mohamad. After the election, she accused Starmer of "burying his head in the sand" in response to Labour losses to other pro-Palestinian independent candidates, such as Shockat Adam and Ayoub Khan, elsewhere at the general election. The Muslim Vote identified Ilford North as one of a number of seats in which running a single unified candidate on a left-wing or pro-Palestinian platform, potentially involving an alignment with opposition parties such as the Green Party of England and Wales, could have deprived Labour of a victory.
