= Peter Tripp (diplomat) =

British diplomat (1921–2010)

- Born: 27 March 1921
- Died: 11 December 2010 (aged 89)
- Occupation: British diplomat

Peter John Tripp CMG (27 March 1921 – 11 December 2010) was a British diplomat.

== Biography ==
Born in 1921, Peter Tripp was educated at Bedford School. He served in the Royal Marines during the Second World War and in the Sudan Political Service between 1946 and 1954, when he joined the British Diplomatic Service. He was Political Agent in the Trucial States between 1955 and 1958, Head of Chancery in Vienna between 1958 and 1961, and served in various diplomatic posts in Bahrain and Amman between 1961 and 1968, before being appointed as Head of the Near Eastern Department at the Foreign Office in London between 1968 and 1970. It was during this period that he became intimately involved in the diplomatic handling of the Black September hijackings and the detention of Leila Khaled in London in September 1970.

Tripp was British Ambassador to Libya between 1970 and 1974, British High Commissioner to Singapore between 1974 and 1978, and British Ambassador to Thailand between 1978 and 1981.

Diplomatic posts
| Preceded by Donald Maitland | British Ambassador to Libya; 1970–1974 | Succeeded by Donald Murray |
| Preceded by Sir Sam Falle | British High Commissioner to Singapore; 1974–1978 | Succeeded by John Dunn Hennings |
| Preceded by Sir David Cole | British Ambassador to Thailand; 1978–1981 | Succeeded by Justin Staples |
