= List of consuls-general of the United Kingdom to Jerusalem =

The British consul general to Jerusalem was based at 15 Nashashibi Street in Sheikh Jarrah quarter, East Jerusalem. The aim of the consulate general was to represent the United Kingdom in Jerusalem, the West Bank and the Gaza Strip. The consulate also had an office in Gaza.

== List of consuls-general ==
- 1839–1845: William Tanner Young
- 1846–1863: James Finn
- 1863–1890: Noel Temple Moore
- 1890–1906: John Dickson
- 1906–1909: Edward C. Blech
- 1909–1912: Peter J.C. McGregor

There was no consul-general during World War I since the UK was an enemy of the Ottoman Empire. After the war and until 1948, Palestine was a British mandate territory, with district commissioners.

- 1948–1951: Sir Hugh Dow
- 1951–1953: Herbert R. Gybbon-Monypenny
- 1957–1959: Andrew C. Stewart
- 1959–1962: James M. Walsh
- 1962–1964: Alastair G. Maitland
- 1964–1967: Hubert N. Pullar
- 1967–1970: John H. Lewen
- 1970–1974: John M. O. Snodgrass
- 1974–1976: Edward E. Key
- 1976–1980: Michael P.V. Hannam
- 1980–1984: Donald A. Hamley
- 1984–1987: Patrick G. de Courcy-Ireland
- 1987–1990: Ivan R. Callan
- 1990–1993: David R. MacLennan
- 1993–1997: Richard J. Dalton
- 1997–2001: Robin A. Kealy
- 2001–2003: Geoffrey Adams
- 2003–2006: Dr. John Jenkins
- 2007–2010: Richard Makepeace
- 2010–2013: Sir Vincent Fean
- 2014–2017: Alastair McPhail
- 2017–2021: Philip Hall
- 2021–2024: Diane Corner
- 2024–2026: Helen Winterton

== See also ==
- Consulate General of the United Kingdom, Jerusalem
