= John Ure (diplomat) =

British diplomat and author (1931–2023)

Sir John Burns Ure KCMG LVO FRGS (5 July 1931 – 19 September 2023) was a British diplomat who was ambassador to Cuba, Brazil and Sweden, and an author.

== Life and career ==
John Burns Ure was born on 5 July 1931, and was educated at Uppingham School. After active service as a 2nd Lieutenant with the Cameronians (Scottish Rifles) in Malaya, 1950–51, he read history at Magdalene College, Cambridge before joining the Foreign Service in 1956. Besides various posts at the Foreign Office he was 3rd Secretary (and private secretary to the Ambassador), Moscow, 1957–59; 2nd Secretary, Léopoldville, 1962–63; First Secretary (Commercial), Santiago, 1967–70; Counsellor, and intermittently Chargé d'Affaires, Lisbon, 1972–77; Ambassador to Cuba 1979–81; Ambassador to Brazil 1984–87 and Ambassador to Sweden 1987–91. During his career he attended the six-week Advanced Management Program at Harvard Business School.

After retiring from the Diplomatic Service, Sir John was a non-executive director of companies including Thomas Cook and Sotheby's Scandinavia, and served on the council of the Royal Geographical Society of which he was a Life Fellow.

John Ure was appointed a Member (4th Class) of the Royal Victorian Order (LVO) in 1968, and appointed a Companion of the Order of St Michael and St George (CMG) in the 1980 Birthday Honours and promoted to Knight Commander of that Order (KCMG) in the 1987 New Year Honours. In 1973 he was made a Commander in the Portuguese Military Order of Christ.

In Who's Who, John Ure gives his recreation as "Travelling uncomfortably in remote places and writing about it comfortably afterwards."

Sir John Ure died on 19 September 2023, at the age of 92.

== Bibliography ==
=== Books ===
- Cucumber Sandwiches in the Andes, Constable, London, 1973. ISBN 0094592705
- Prince Henry the Navigator, Constable, London, 1977. ISBN 0094612404
- The Trail of Tamerlane, Constable, London, 1980. ISBN 0094633509
- The Quest for Captain Morgan, Constable, London, 1983. ISBN 0094652600
- Trespassers on the Amazon, Constable, London, 1986. ISBN 0094665001
- contribution to: Royal Geographical Society History of World Exploration (Central and South America sections), Hamlyn, London, 1991. ISBN 0600568199
- A Bird on the Wing: Bonnie Prince Charlie's Flight from Culloden Retraced, Constable, London, 1992. ISBN 0094698902
- Diplomatic Bag: An Anthology of Diplomatic Incidents and Anecdotes from the Renaissance to the Gulf War (ed.), John Murray, London, 1994. ISBN 0719548268
- The Cossacks, Constable, London, 1999. ISBN 0094774005
- In Search of Nomads: An English Obsession from Hester Stanhope to Bruce Chatwin, Constable, London, 2003. ISBN 1841193089
- Pilgrimage: The Great Adventure of the Middle Ages, Constable, London, 2006. ISBN 1841197866
- contribution to: The Seventy Great Journeys in History (ed. Robin Hanbury-Tenison), Thames & Hudson, London, 2006. ISBN 0500251290
- Shooting Leave: Spying out Central Asia in the Great Game, Constable, London, 2009. ISBN 1849010404
- contribution to: The Great Explorers (ed. Robin Hanbury-Tenison), Thames & Hudson, London, 2010. ISBN 050025169X
- Sabres on the Steppes: Danger, Diplomacy and Adventures in the Great Game, Constable, London, 2012. ISBN 1849016674
- Beware the Rugged Russian Bear: British Adventurers Confronting the Early Bolsheviks, Old Street, London, 2015. ISBN 1908699582

=== Book reviews ===
| Year | Review article | Work(s) reviewed |
|---|---|---|
| 2014 | Ure, John (10 September 2014). "[Untitled review]". Country Life. 208 (37): 140. | Parker, Matthew (2014). Goldeneye : where Bond was born : Ian Fleming's Jamaica. London: Hutchinson. ISBN 978-0-091954109. |

Diplomatic posts
| Preceded by Edward Jackson | British Ambassador to Cuba; 1979–1981 | Succeeded by David Thomas |
| Preceded by William Harding | British Ambassador to Brazil; 1984–1987 | Succeeded by Michael Newington |
| Preceded by Sir Richard Parsons | British Ambassador to Sweden; 1987–1991 | Succeeded by John Grant |
