= John Grant (British diplomat) =

British diplomat

Sir John Grant KCMG

Principal Private Secretary to the Secretary of State for Foreign and Commonwealth Affairs
- In office 1997–1999
- Preceded by: Sir William Ehrman
- Succeeded by: Sir Sherard Cowper-Coles

Personal details
- Born: 17 October 1954 (age 71) Colony of Singapore
- Education: St Catharine's College, Cambridge

Sir John Douglas Kelso Grant KCMG (born 17 October 1954) is a retired British diplomat whose last diplomatic post was Permanent Representative of the United Kingdom to the European Union between 2003 and 2007. He now has a small number of part-time advisory roles.

== Education ==
Grant was born in the Colony of Singapore and educated at the Edinburgh Academy and St Catharine's College, Cambridge, where he read French and German.

== Career ==
Grant's first postings were in Stockholm (1977–1980) and Moscow (1982–1984). After 18 months with Morgan Grenfell, a London-based merchant bank, he returned to the Foreign Office as a press officer. He was posted to Brussels in 1989 and spent most of the next eight years working there in three different roles.

He was Principal Private Secretary to the Foreign Secretary from 1997 to 1999 and served as British Ambassador to Sweden from 1999 to 2003.

Grant was then appointed UK Permanent Representative to the European Union. He chaired the Committee of Permanent Representatives (COREPER) during Britain's presidency of the EU in 2005.

After leaving the Foreign Office in 2007 Grant worked for BHP Billiton in London from 2007 to 2009, was executive vice-president, policy and corporate affairs, at BG Group from 2009 to 2015, and vice-president, international government relations, Anadarko Petroleum from 2015 to 2019.

Grant was appointed a Companion of the Order of St Michael and St George (CMG) in the 1999 Birthday Honours, and promoted to Knight Commander of the Order (KCMG) in the 2005 New Year Honours.

== Offices held ==
Diplomatic posts
Preceded by Sir William Ehrman	Principal Private Secretary to the Foreign Secretary; 1997-1999	Succeeded by Sir Sherard Cowper-Coles
Preceded by Sir John Ure	British Ambassador to Sweden; 1999–2003	Succeeded by Anthony Cary
Preceded by Sir Nigel Sheinwald	UK Permanent Representative to the European Union; 2003-2007	Succeeded by Sir Kim Darroch
