= List of ambassadors of the United Kingdom to Libya =

The ambassador of the United Kingdom to Libya is the United Kingdom's foremost diplomatic representative in Libya, and head of the UK's diplomatic mission in Tripoli.

As of 4 August 2014 the British Embassy in Tripoli suspended operations due to renewed civil war in Libya. The ambassador and staff operate from Tunisia for the time being.

In September 2021, Caroline Hurndall MBE became the first female British ambassador to Tripoli, replacing Nicholas (Nick) Hopton.

== Consuls-general in Tripoli ==
- 1677–1685: Thomas Baker
- 1 April 1894: Thomas Sampson Jago

== Ambassadors ==
- 1952–1954: Alec Kirkbride
- 1955–1959: Walter Graham
- 1959–1961: Derek Riches
- 1962–1963: Andrew Stewart
- 1964–1969: Roderick Sarell
- 1969–1970: Donald Maitland
- 1970–1974: Peter Tripp
- 1974–1976: Donald Murray
- 1977–1980: Anthony Williams
- 1980–1983: Michael Edes
- 1984: Oliver Miles

Diplomatic relations were broken over the murder of WPC Yvonne Fletcher in 1984. Britain and Libya resumed diplomatic relations in July 1999.

- 1999–2002: Richard Dalton
- 2002–2006: Anthony Layden
- 2006–2010: Vincent Fean
- 2010–2011: Richard Northern

From March to October 2011 the British Embassy in Tripoli was closed due to the Libyan Civil War.

- 2011 Oct–Nov: Sir John Jenkins
- 2011–2012: Sir Dominic Asquith
- 2013–2015: Michael Aron
- 2015–2018: Peter Millett
- 2018–2019: Frank Baker
- 2019–2019: Martin Reynolds
- 2019–2021 Nicholas Hopton
- 2021–2023: Caroline Hurndall
- 2023–present: Martin Longden
