= David Logan (diplomat) =

British Diplomat

Sir David Logan KCMG (born 11 August 1943) is a former British diplomat who was the British Ambassador to Turkey from 1997 - 2001. Previously he had been Minister, Washington DC from 1995 to 1997, Assistant Under Secretary of State, Defence Policy between 1994 and 1995 and Assistant Under Secretary of State, Central and Eastern Europe, 1992-1994.

Logan entered the Foreign and Commonwealth Office in 1965 and his first posting was to Turkey, initially at the British Consulate in Istanbul and then the British Embassy in Ankara.

In 1970, he was appointed Private Secretary to the Parliamentary Under Secretary of State for Foreign and Commonwealth Affairs, Anthony Royle. From 1973 to 1977, he was First Secretary to the UK Mission to the United Nations before returning to the Foreign & Commonwealth Office in London.

Logan served as Counsellor, Head of Chancery and Consul-General to Norway from 1982 before returning to London in 1986 as Head of Personnel Operations Department for the Foreign & Commonwealth Office.

He was a Senior Associate Member, St Antony's College, University of Oxford, between 1988 and 1989 before being posted to the Soviet Union as Minister and Deputy Head of Mission of the British Embassy, Moscow.

Subsequently he was Assistant Under Secretary of State, Central and Eastern Europe, and then Assistant Under Secretary of State, Defence Policy, between 1992 and 1995.

Between 1995 and 1997, Logan served as Minister and Deputy Ambassador in Washington DC 1995-97.

From 1997 to 2001, Logan was HM Ambassador to Turkey.

Following his retirement from the Diplomatic Service, Logan became Director of the Centre for Studies in Security and Diplomacy, and Honorary Professor, School of Social Sciences, University of Birmingham (2002-06).

Since 2006, he has served variously as an adviser to HSBC, Efes Breweries International and Thames Water amongst others.

Logan was Chair of GAP Activity Projects between 2002 and 2007 and Chair of the British Institute at Ankara from 2006 to 2016. He has been a Vice President of the British Institute at Ankara since 2016. He was elected a Fellow of the Society of Antiquaries in 2020.

== Personal life ==
Logan is the son of Captain Brian Ewen Weldon Logan RN (Retd) and Mary Logan (née Fass). He was educated at Charterhouse and University College, University of Oxford. In 1967, he married Judith Margaret Walton Cole. They have one son and one daughter (and one son deceased).

== Honours and awards ==
He was appointed a Companion of the Order of St Michael and St George in the 1991 New Years Honours before being promoted to Knight Commander (KCMG) in the 2000 New Years Honours.

He was granted an honorary doctorate (D. Univ) from the University of Birmingham in 2014.
