= Richard Parsons (diplomat) =

British diplomat and writer (1928–2016)

Sir Richard Parsons KCMG (b. Marylebone 14 March 1928 – 23 April 2016) was a British diplomat who was ambassador to Hungary, Spain and Sweden, and a novelist, playwright and (under a pseudonym) crime writer.

== Career ==
Richard Edmund Clement Fownes Parsons was educated at Bembridge School and Brasenose College, Oxford. He served in the British Army 1949–51, then joined the Diplomatic Service. Between posts at the Foreign Office (later the Foreign and Commonwealth Office) he served at the embassies in Washington, D.C., Vientiane, Buenos Aires, Ankara and Lagos. He was ambassador to Hungary 1976–79, to Spain 1980–84, and to Sweden 1984–87. He was appointed a Companion of the Order of St Michael and St George (CMG) in the 1977 New Year Honours while in Hungary and promoted to Knight Commander of the Order (KCMG) in the 1982 Birthday Honours during his posting to Spain.

He died on 23 April 2016 at the age of 88.

== Publications ==
- The Moon Pool, Mandarin, 1990. ISBN 0749301333
- Rialto : Mortmain : Dead end : three plays, Samuel French, 1993. ISBN 0573100012
- The Den of the Basilisk, Melrose Books, 2012. ISBN 1907732934
- Howling at the Moon, Melrose Books, 2013. ISBN 1908645644

As John Haythorne:

- None of Us Cared for Kate, Cassell, 1968. ISBN 0304931969
- The Strelsau dimension, Quartet, 1981. ISBN 0704322854
- Mandrake in Granada, Ross Anderson, Bolton, 1984. ISBN 0863600115
- Mandrake in the monastery, Ross Anderson, Bolton, 1985. ISBN 0863600190

Diplomatic posts
Preceded by John Wilson	Ambassador Extraordinary and Plenipotentiary to the Hungarian People's Republic; 1976–1979	Succeeded by Bryan Cartledge
Preceded by Antony Acland	Ambassador Extraordinary and Plenipotentiary at Madrid; 1980–1984	Succeeded by Lord Nicholas Gordon-Lennox
Preceded by Sir Donald Murray	Ambassador Extraordinary and Plenipotentiary at Stockholm; 1984–1987	Succeeded by Sir John Ure
