= John Jenkins (diplomat) =

British diplomat (born 1955)

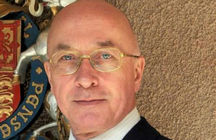
Sir John Jenkins

Sir John Jenkins KCMG LVO (born 26 January 1955) is a British former diplomat who was ambassador to several countries.

== Career ==
John Jenkins was educated at St Philip's Grammar School, Birmingham, The Becket School, Nottinghamshire and Jesus College, Cambridge where he gained a BA and a doctorate (PhD) in 1980. He joined the Foreign and Commonwealth Office (FCO) in 1980 and served in Abu Dhabi, Kuala Lumpur and Kuwait before being appointed ambassador to Burma 1999–2002; Consul-General at Jerusalem 2003–06; ambassador to Syria 2006–07; Director, Middle East and North Africa at the FCO 2007–09; ambassador to Iraq 2009–11; UK Special Representative to the National Transitional Council of Libya May–October 2011, then briefly ambassador to Libya October–November 2011; and ambassador to Saudi Arabia from June 2012.

At the end of January 2015 he retired from the Diplomatic Service and as of 27 January 2015 became Executive Director of the Middle East branch of the International Institute for Strategic Studies, based in Bahrain.

Jenkins was appointed LVO in 1989, CMG in the New Year Honours of 2003 and knighted KCMG in the Queen's Birthday Honours of 2011. He is a Serving Brother of the Order of St John of Jerusalem.

== Sources ==
- JENKINS, Sir John, Who's Who 2013, A & C Black, 2013; online edn, Oxford University Press, Dec 2012
- Sir John Jenkins, gov.uk

Diplomatic posts
Preceded by Robert Gordon	Ambassador at Rangoon; 1999–2002	Succeeded by Vicky Bowman
Preceded by Geoffrey Adams	Consul-General at Jerusalem; 2003–2006	Succeeded by Richard Makepeace
Preceded by Peter Ford	Ambassador to the Syrian Arab Republic; 2006–2007	Succeeded by Simon Collis
Preceded by Christopher Prentice	Ambassador to the Republic of Iraq; 2009–2011	Succeeded by Michael Aron
Preceded by Richard Northern	Ambassador to Libya; 2011	Succeeded by Sir Dominic Asquith
Preceded by Sir Tom Phillips	Ambassador to the Kingdom of Saudi Arabia; 2012–2015	Succeeded by Simon Collis
