= Keith Ovenden =

English writer (1943–2023)

Keith Ovenden ONZM
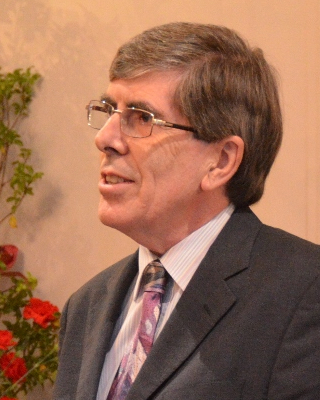
- Ovenden in 2013
- Born: 6 August 1943; London, England
- Died: 23 June 2023 (aged 79)
- Education: University of Oxford
- Spouse: Helen Sutch (m. 1971)

Academic background
- Thesis: The renationalisation of the iron and steel industry, 1964–67: a study in legislative politics (1971)

Keith William Ovenden ONZM (6 August 1943 – 23 June 2023) was an English novelist and biographer.

Ovenden was born on 6 August 1943 in London, where he was also raised. He was educated at Wanstead County High School. He went on to study for degrees at the University of Keele, University of Michigan, and the University of Oxford. He started his career lecturing at the University of Essex in the Department of Government, and later taught political sociology at the University of Canterbury in New Zealand, before becoming a full-time writer in 1982.

Ovenden first visited New Zealand in 1966 as a member of the British Universities debating team, and returned in 1972 as a post-doctoral fellow at Victoria University of Wellington. He achieved prominence in New Zealand during the 1970s for his commentaries on politics and media. This prominence extended into the 1980s, with his reporting on the sinking of the Rainbow Warrior in 1985 standing out. He was married to Helen Sutch, daughter of Bill Sutch and Shirley Smith.

Ovenden chaired the board of trustees of the New Zealand Portrait Gallery from October 2012 to December 2018. He was involved with the organisation for 13 years. Since 2019, an annual lecture is given in honour of Ovenden's work for the New Zealand Portrait Gallery, with him giving the inaugural lecture.

Ovenden was appointed Officer of the New Zealand Order of Merit in the 2020 New Years Honours, for services to the arts.

Ovenden died on 23 June 2023, at the age of 79.

== Books ==
=== Novels ===
- —— (1984). Ratatui (paperback ed.). Random House New Zealand. ISBN 9780908636013.
- —— (1986). O.E. Benton Ross. ISBN 9780908636235.
- —— (1998). The Greatest Sorrow. Penguin. ISBN 9780241139776.
- —— (2000). Quick Bright Things. Hamish Hamilton. ISBN 9780241140871.

=== Biographies ===
- —— (1996). A Fighting Withdrawal: The Life of Dan Davin – Writer, Soldier, Publisher (hardcover ed.). Oxford University Press. ISBN 9780192123350.
- —— (2020). Bill & Shirley: A Memoir (hardcover ed.). Massey University Press. ISBN 9780995131835.

=== Academic works ===
- —— (1989). Cole, Tony (ed.). Apartheid and International Finance: A Programme for Change (paperback ed.). Penguin. ISBN 9780140128352.
