= HMS Encounter (H10) =

E-class destroyer in the Royal Navy

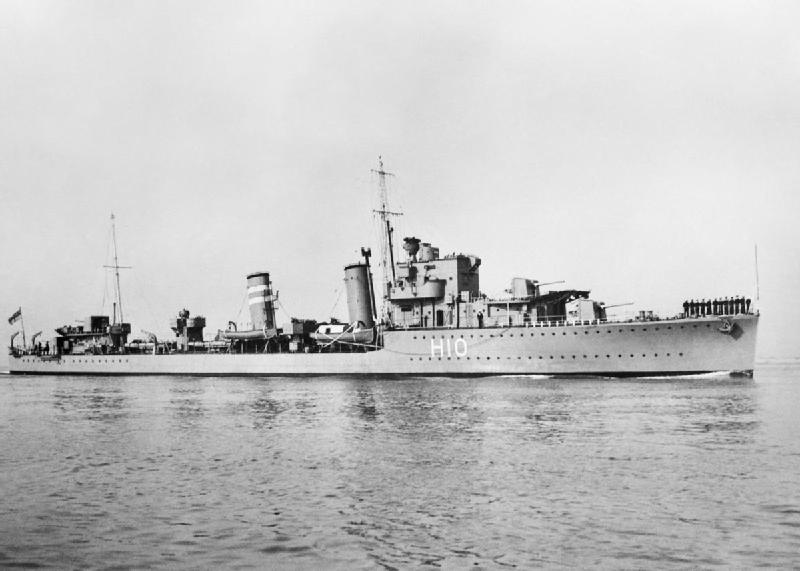
- Encounter in July 1938

History

United Kingdom
- Name: HMS Encounter
- Ordered: 1 November 1932
- Builder: Hawthorn Leslie and Company, Hebburn
- Cost: £252,250
- Laid down: 15 March 1933
- Launched: 29 March 1934
- Completed: 2 November 1934
- Identification: Pennant number: H10
- Motto: Acta non verba; ("Deeds not words")
- Honours and awards: Atlantic 1939; Norway 1940; Spartivento 1940; Libya 1941; Malta Convoys 1941; Mediterranean 1941
- Fate: Sunk in the Second Battle of the Java Sea, 1 March 1942
- Badge: On a Field Green, two rapiers crossed Silver

General characteristics
- Class & type: E-class destroyer
- Displacement: 1,405 long tons (1,428 t) (standard); 1,940 long tons (1,970 t) (deep load)
- Length: 329 ft (100.3 m) o/a
- Beam: 33 ft 3 in (10.13 m)
- Draught: 12 ft 6 in (3.81 m) (deep)
- Installed power: 36,000 shp (26,800 kW); 3 × Admiralty 3-drum boilers
- Propulsion: 2 × shafts; 2 × geared steam turbines
- Speed: 35.5 knots (65.7 km/h; 40.9 mph)
- Range: 6,350 nmi (11,760 km; 7,310 mi) at 15 knots (28 km/h; 17 mph)
- Complement: 145
- Sensors & processing systems: ASDIC
- Armament: 4 × single QF 4.7-inch (120 mm) Mk IX guns; 2 × quadruple 0.5-inch (12.7 mm) machine guns; 2 × quadruple 21-inch (533 mm) torpedo tubes; 20 × depth charges, 1 rack and 2 throwers

HMS Encounter was an E-class destroyer built for the Royal Navy in the early 1930s. Although assigned to the Home Fleet upon completion, the ship was attached to the Mediterranean Fleet in 1935–36 during the Abyssinia Crisis. During the Spanish Civil War of 1936–39, she spent considerable time in Spanish waters, enforcing the arms blockade imposed by Britain and France on both sides of the conflict. Encounter was assigned to convoy escort and anti-submarine patrol duties in the Western Approaches, when World War II began in September 1939. She participated in the Norwegian Campaign before joining Force H in mid-1940 and was present during the Battles of Dakar and Cape Spartivento later that year. The ship was transferred to the Mediterranean Fleet in 1941 where she escorted convoys to Malta.

Encounter was badly damaged while refitting at Malta a few weeks after arriving in the Mediterranean and was briefly reassigned to Force H after her repairs were completed before rejoining the Mediterranean Fleet later in the year. Late in the year, the ship was transferred to the Eastern Fleet at Singapore and spent several months in early 1942 on convoy escort duties under the control of American-British-Dutch-Australian Command (ABDACOM). She was one of the Allied ships retasked to intercept Japanese invasion convoys during the Dutch East Indies Campaign in February 1942 and participated in the Battle of the Java Sea. Encounter was sunk a few days later in the Second Battle of the Java Sea on 1 March and most of her crew were rescued by a Japanese ship the next day. About a quarter of them died in captivity before the end of the war in 1945. The ship's wreck was discovered in 2007 and had been almost totally destroyed by illegal salvagers by 2016.

== Description ==
The E-class ships were slightly improved versions of the preceding D class. They displaced 1,405 long tons (1,428 t) at standard load and 1,940 long tons (1,970 t) at deep load. The ships had an overall length of 329 feet (100.3 m), a beam of 33 feet 3 inches (10.1 m) and a draught of 12 feet 6 inches (3.8 m). They were powered by two Parsons geared steam turbines, each driving one propeller shaft, using steam provided by three Admiralty three-drum boilers. The turbines developed a total of 36,000 shaft horsepower (27,000 kW) and gave a maximum speed of 35.5 knots (65.7 km/h; 40.9 mph). Encounter carried a maximum of 470 long tons (480 t) of fuel oil that gave her a range of 6,350 nautical miles (11,760 km; 7,310 mi) at 15 knots (28 km/h; 17 mph). The ships' complement was 145 officers and ratings.

The ships mounted four 4.7-inch (120 mm) Mark IX guns in single mounts. For anti-aircraft (AA) defence, they had two quadruple mounts for the Vickers 0.5 in (12.7 mm) AA machinegun. The E class was fitted with two above-water quadruple mounts for 21-inch (533 mm) torpedoes. One depth charge rail and two throwers were fitted; 20 depth charges were originally carried, but this increased to 35 shortly after the war began. By April 1941, the after bank of torpedo tubes had been replaced with a QF 12-pounder 20-cwt anti-aircraft gun, (Note: "Cwt" is the abbreviation for hundredweight, 20 cwt referring to the weight of the gun.) the after mast and funnel being cut down to improve the gun's field of fire. It is uncertain if Encounter had radar fitted before she was transferred to the Far East, but a Type 286 surface-search set was the most likely type to be installed.

== Construction and career ==
Encounter, the sixth ship of that name to serve with the Royal Navy, was ordered 1 November 1932, from Hawthorn Leslie & Company at Hebburn under the 1931 Naval Programme. She was laid down 15 March 1932, and launched on 29 March 1934. The ship was commissioned on 2 November 1934, at a total cost of £252,250, excluding government-furnished equipment like the armament. Encounter and her sister ships were assigned to the 5th Destroyer Flotilla (DF) and accompanied the Home Fleet during its West Indies cruise between January and March 1935. Encounter collided with her sister Escapade off Portland on 18 June and was under repair at Devonport Dockyard 18 June–8 July. The ship was attached to the Mediterranean Fleet, together with most of the rest of her flotilla, beginning in September 1935, during the Abyssinian Crisis. She collided with another of her sisters, Echo, on 19 November during a night exercise off Alexandria. While not severely damaged, Encounter was repaired at Malta from 29 November to 8 February 1936 and returned home with the rest of her sisters the next month. The flotilla patrolled Spanish waters in the Bay of Biscay during the Spanish Civil War, enforcing the edicts of the Non-Intervention Committee, in January–March 1937. The ship's bow was badly damaged in another collision on 26 September 1938 and she was repaired at Hebburn beginning the following day. Her repairs lasted through October and then Encounter was attached to the Mediterranean Fleet on non-intervention patrol duties from Gibraltar for the first three months of 1939. The ship began a refit on 15 July, but it was interrupted by the rise of tensions before the start of World War II in September. She was assigned to the 12th DF upon recommissioning and manned with a crew that largely consisted of reservists.

=== World War II ===
Encounter was assigned to convoy escort duties in the Western Approaches Command for the first three months of the war before transferring to Scapa Flow and joining the Home Fleet. At the beginning of the Norwegian Campaign, the ship, together with the destroyer Grenade, escorted the oil tanker SS British Lady to Flakstadøya in the Lofoten Islands on 12 April where a refuelling and repair base was being set up to support British naval operations in northern Norway. For the rest of the month and into May, Encounter escorted the aircraft carriers Ark Royal and Glorious and the battleships Warspite and Valiant in Norwegian waters. On 1 May, she rescued the crew of a shot-down Junkers Ju 87 "Stuka" dive bomber from the water. Two weeks later, the ship rescued a pilot who had run out of fuel near Ankenesstranda on 14 May.

The following month, Encounter covered the destroyer Mashona on 2 June, as the latter ship recovered buoys from the wreck of the boom defence vessel Astronomer off Kinnaird Head. She was refitted at Sheerness Dockyard from 20 June to 20 July and was then transferred to Gibraltar to join the 13th DF of Force H. En route, she escorted several troop ships and the aircraft carrier Argus. During Operation Hurry, Encounter and three other destroyers escorted Argus to a position south-west of Sardinia so the carrier could fly off her Hawker Hurricane fighters to Malta on 2 August. On 13 September, Force H rendezvoused with a convoy that was carrying troops intended to capture Dakar from the Vichy French. Ten days later, they attacked Dakar, but failed to take the city. The ship escorted the battleship Barham and the cruisers Berwick and Glasgow during Operation Coat in early November as they joined the Mediterranean Fleet and then participated in the inconclusive Battle of Cape Spartivento on 27 November during Operation Collar.

==== 1941 ====
After escorting the carrier Furious to Freetown, Sierra Leone, and Takoradi, Ghana, in January 1941, Encounter rejoined Force H in time to participate in Operation Picket at the end of the month. This was an unsuccessful night torpedo attack by eight of Ark Royal's Fairey Swordfish on the Tirso Dam in Sardinia. The British ships returned to Gibraltar on 4 February and began preparing for Operation Grog, a naval bombardment of Genoa, that was successfully carried out five days later. The ship was then transferred to the South Atlantic for escort duties for a time before departing to join the Mediterranean Fleet at Alexandria on 14 April. While refitting in a drydock in Malta, Encounter was damaged by blast and splinters when a bomb detonated on the floor of the dock during an air raid on 29 April. Another bomb struck the ship's forecastle the next day and blew a hole in the hull. She was hit by another bomb on 16 May that blew another hole in the hull and disabled her boilers and cruising turbines when water flooded in through the hull. Repairs took until July to complete, in time for the ship to participate in Operation Substance, during which she escorted six empty freighters from Malta to Gibraltar, 23–26 July. A few days later, she escorted reinforcements to Malta during Operation Style. On 22 August, Force H, escorted by Encounter and four other destroyers, sailed to attack the airfield at Tempio Pausania, Sardinia, as a diversion for Manxman as she laid a minefield off Livorno, Italy.

The ship was reassigned to the South Atlantic Command for the month of September before rejoining the Mediterranean Fleet in Alexandria on 16 October. She spent most of the next month escorting convoys to Tobruk. Together with the destroyer Hotspur and Hero, Encounter was escorting the minelayer Latona on 25 October whilst en route to Tobruk when they were attacked by Stukas of I./StG 1 that hit Latona and set her afire. Hero and Encounter came alongside and rescued her crew and passengers before Latona's magazine exploded. Encounter was transferred to the Eastern Fleet the following month and departed Alexandria on 14 November bound for Singapore. En route, she rendezvoused with the battleship Prince of Wales and the battlecruiser Repulse of Force Z at Colombo, Ceylon, on 28 November. The ships arrived at their destination on 2 December.

Encounter required a refit upon her arrival and was thus unavailable when Force Z sortied on 8 December on their ill-fated attempt to intercept the Japanese invasion convoys. Four days later, the ship escorted a convoy from Singapore to the Sunda Strait. She remained based at Singapore until 20 January 1942 when she was transferred to the 7th DF of the China Force. Under the command of ABDACOM, the force was tasked with escorting convoys to and from Singapore and the Dutch East Indies. Encounter continued to escort convoys until late February.

==== First Battle of the Java Sea ====
On 25 February, Vice Admiral Conrad Helfrich of the Royal Netherlands Navy, the new commander of Allied naval forces in the East Indies, ordered all available warships to join the Dutch Rear Admiral Karel Doorman's Eastern Striking Force at Surabaya. Encounter, together with the destroyers Jupiter and Electra, escorted the British heavy cruiser Exeter and the Australian light cruiser Perth, there that same day. After they had arrived the following day, Doorman's entire force of five cruisers and nine destroyers departed Surabaya at 18:30 to patrol off Eastern Java in hopes of intercepting the oncoming invasion convoy which had been spotted earlier that morning. The Japanese were further north than he anticipated and his ships found nothing. His own ships were located at 09:35 on the following morning, 27 February, and were continuously tracked by the Japanese. Doorman ordered a return to Surabaya at 10:30 and his ships were attacked by eight bombers from the Kanoya Air Group at 14:37. They claimed to have made two hits on Jupiter, but actually missed the British destroyer. Just as his leading ships were entering harbour, he received reports of Japanese ships 90 miles (140 km) to the north and Doorman ordered his ships to turn about to intercept them.

Aware of Doorman's movements, the Japanese commander, Rear Admiral Takeo Takagi, detached the convoy's two escorting destroyer flotillas, each consisting of a light cruiser and seven destroyers, to intercept the Allied ships in conjunction with his own pair of heavy cruisers, (Nachi and Haguro), which were escorted by a pair of destroyers. His heavy cruisers opened fire at long range at 15:47 with little effect. The light cruisers and destroyers closed to ranges between 13,000 and 15,000 yards (12,000 and 14,000 m) and began firing Type 93 "Long Lance" torpedoes beginning at 16:03. All of these torpedoes failed to damage their targets, although one torpedo hit Exeter and failed to detonate at 16:35. Three minutes later, Haguro changed the course of the battle when one of her shells detonated in Exeter's forward boiler room, knocking six of her boilers off-line. The ship sheered out of line to avoid another torpedo and slowed, followed by all of the trailing cruisers. Perth laid a smoke screen to protect Exeter and the Allied ships sorted themselves into separate groups as they attempted to disengage. Exeter was escorted by one Dutch and all three British destroyers in one group and the other cruisers and the American destroyers formed the other group. The Japanese did not initially press their pursuit as they maneuvered to use their torpedoes against the crippled Exeter, which could only make 5 knots (9.3 km/h; 5.8 mph), and her escorts.

The Japanese began launching torpedoes beginning at 17:20 at ranges of 10,000 to 18,500 yards (9,100 to 16,900 m), but they all missed. For an unknown reason, two Japanese destroyers continued to close before firing their torpedoes at 6,500 yards (5,900 m) and Encounter and Electra pulled out of line to counterattack. They engaged Asagumo and Minegumo at close range as they closed. Encounter and Minegumo exchanged fire at ranges down to 3,000 yards (2,700 m) for about ten minutes, but they failed to inflict any significant damage on each other. On the other hand, Asagumo was damaged by Electra, but the Japanese ship sank the British destroyer at 17:46. Exeter continued south to Surabaya, escorted by the Dutch destroyer Witte de With. Doorman's repeated unsuccessful, and ultimately fatal, attempts to reach the transports concentrated the Japanese on the task of protecting the transports and allowed the damaged British cruiser to reach harbour. Between 22:00 and 22:30 that evening Encounter rescued over one hundred survivors from the Dutch destroyer Kortenaer which had been sunk by torpedo late that afternoon, and took them back to Surabaya.

==== Second Battle of the Java Sea ====
The following day, after making temporary repairs and refuelling, Exeter, Encounter and the American destroyer Pope were ordered to sail to Colombo, via the Sunda Strait. They departed on the evening of 28 February, but were intercepted by the Japanese heavy cruisers Nachi, Haguro, Myōkō and Ashigara and the destroyers Akebono, Inazuma, Yamakaze and Kawakaze on the morning of 1 March. About 08:00, the British ships spotted Myōkō and Ashigara, one of which launched its spotting floatplanes. Haguro and Nachi were seen closing in, and both launched their aircraft before opening fire at about 09:30. The Allied ships laid smoke and turned away to the east with the Japanese to their north and south. Exeter was able to reach a speed of 26 knots (48 km/h; 30 mph) before the first hit on her again detonated in a boiler room and knocked out all power around 11:20. Encounter turned back to lay a smoke screen to protect the immobilised cruiser, and aid survivors, but she became the target of Yamakaze and Kawakaze, who scored 5-inch (127 mm) shell hits that disabled her steering gear and caused her to lose speed. Soon, Myōkō and Ashigara joined into the pounding with their 8-inch (203 mm) guns as a near miss lifted Encounter out of the water followed by solid hits as gunfire from the four Japanese warships immobilised Encounter and set her on fire. Lieutenant Commander Eric Morgan, the destroyer's captain, ordered the ship scuttled to prevent her capture by the Japanese. She capsized and sank about 12:10. Pope initially escaped this melee, only to be sunk about two hours later as well; crippled by dive bombers from the light carrier Ryūjō and finished off by gunfire from Myōkō and Ashigara.

Eight of the ship's company were killed and the remaining 149 became prisoners of war when they were rescued the following day, along with the remaining survivors from Exeter that were still in the water, by the Japanese destroyer Ikazuchi. The Encounter survivors had been adrift for some 20 hours, in rafts and lifejackets or clinging to floats, many coated in oil and unable to see. Among the rescued was Lieutenant (later Sir) Sam Falle, an officer aboard Encounter, who would go on to become a British diplomat. This humanitarian decision by Lieutenant Commander Shunsaku Kudō placed Ikazuchi at risk of submarine attack, and interfered with her fighting ability due to the sheer numbers of rescued sailors. The action was later the subject of a book and a TV special. 38 of the ship's crew subsequently died in captivity.

The wreck was originally discovered on 21 February 2007, lying at a depth of 60–61 metres (197–200 ft). During an expedition to survey the site in 2016, it was found to have been almost completely destroyed by illegal salvage operations.

== Bibliography ==
- Admiralty Historical Section (2002). The Royal Navy and the Mediterranean. Whitehall histories., Naval Staff histories. Vol. 2, November 1940 – December 1941. London: Whitehall History in association with Frank Cass. ISBN 0-7146-5205-9.
- Colledge, J. J.; Warlow, Ben (2006) [1969]. Ships of the Royal Navy: The Complete Record of All Fighting Ships of the Royal Navy from the 15th Century to the Present (3rd Rev ed.). London: Chatham Publishing. ISBN 978-1-86176-281-8. OCLC 67375475.
- Dull, Paul S. (2007). A Battle History of the Imperial Japanese Navy, 1941–1945. Annapolis, Maryland: Naval Institute Press. ISBN 978-1-59114-219-5.
- English, John (1993). Amazon to Ivanhoe: British Standard Destroyers of the 1930s. Kendal, England: World Ship Society. ISBN 0-905617-64-9.
- Evans, Arthur S. (2010). Destroyer Down: An Account of HM Destroyer Losses 1939–1945. Barnsley, South Yorkshire, UK: Pen & Sword Maritime. ISBN 978-1-84884-270-0.
- Friedman, Norman (2009). British Destroyers From Earliest Days to the Second World War. Annapolis, Maryland: Naval Institute Press. ISBN 978-1-59114-081-8.
- Gill, G. Hermon (1957). "Chapter 14: South–West Pacific Area" (PDF). Australia in the War of 1939–1945: Series Two Navy: Volume I: The Royal Australian Navy, 1939–1942. Canberra, Australia: Australian War Memorial. pp. 484–512. OCLC 848228.
- Gill, G. Hermon (1957). "Chapter 15: ABDA and ANZAC" (PDF). Australia in the War of 1939–1945: Series Two Navy: Volume I: The Royal Australian Navy, 1939–1942. Canberra, Australia: Australian War Memorial. pp. 513–72. OCLC 848228.
- Gill, G. Hermon (1957). "Chapter 16: Defeat in ABDA". Australia in the War of 1939–1945: Series Two Navy: Volume I: The Royal Australian Navy, 1939–1942. Canberra, Australia: Australian War Memorial. pp. 571–624. OCLC 848228.
- Grove, Eric (1993). Sea Battles in Close Up: World War 2. Vol. 2 (U.S. Navy Memorial Foundation Advisory Council ed.). Annapolis, Maryland: Naval Institute Press. ISBN 1-55750-758-9.
- Haarr, Geirr H. (2010). The Battle for Norway: April–June 1940. Annapolis, Maryland: Naval Institute Press. ISBN 978-1-59114-051-1.
- Lacroix, Eric & Wells, Linton (1997). Japanese Cruisers of the Pacific War. Annapolis, Maryland: Naval Institute Press. ISBN 0-87021-311-3.
- Lenton, H. T. (1998). British & Empire Warships of the Second World War. Annapolis, Maryland: Naval Institute Press. ISBN 1-55750-048-7.
- Middlebrook, Martin & Mahoney, Patrick (2004). The Sinking of the Prince of Wales and Repulse: The End of the Battleship Era. Barnsley: Leo Cooper. ISBN 978-1-84415-075-5.
- Nailer, Roger (1990). "Aircraft to Malta". In Gardiner, Robert (ed.). Warship 1990. London: Naval Institute Press. pp. 151–65. ISBN 1-55750-903-4.
- Osborne, Richard (1990). "Question 31/89". Warship International. XXVII (4): 416–417. ISSN 0043-0374.
- Rohwer, Jürgen (2005). Chronology of the War at Sea 1939–1945: The Naval History of World War Two (Third Revised ed.). Annapolis, Maryland: Naval Institute Press. ISBN 1-59114-119-2.
- Shores, Christopher; Cull, Brian & Izawa, Yasuho (1993). Bloody Shambles: Volume Two: The Defence of Sumatra to the Fall of Burma. London: Grub Street. ISBN 0-948817-67-4.
- Whitley, M. J. (1988). Destroyers of World War Two: An International Encyclopedia. Annapolis, Maryland: Naval Institute Press. ISBN 0-87021-326-1.
