= Donald Murray (diplomat) =

British diplomat (1924–1998)

Sir Donald Murray KCVO CMG

British Ambassador to Sweden
- In office 1980–1984
- Preceded by: Sir Jeffrey Petersen
- Succeeded by: Sir Richard Parsons

British Ambassador to Libya
- In office 1974–1976
- Preceded by: Peter Tripp
- Succeeded by: Anthony Williams

Personal details
- Born: 14 June 1924 London
- Died: 8 January 1998 (aged 73)
- Children: 4
- Education: Worcester College, Oxford
- Occupation: Diplomat

Sir Donald Frederick Murray (14 June 1924 – 8 January 1998) was a British diplomat who served as ambassador to Libya from 1974 to 1976 and ambassador to Sweden from 1980 to 1984.

== Early life and education ==
Murray was born on 14 June 1924 in London, the son of A. T. Murray and F. M. Murray née Byfield. He was educated at Colfe's School; The King's School, Canterbury; and Worcester College, Oxford where he was an exhibitioner and studied international relations.

== Career ==
After serving during World War II with the Royal Marines (41 (RM) Commando) from 1943 to 1946, and having been severely wounded in 1945, Murray entered the Foreign Office in 1948. His first posting was to Warsaw as third secretary followed by two years at the Foreign Office. In 1953, he was promoted to second secretary and went to Vienna, and in 1956 was attached to the political office of the Middle East Forces in Cyprus. From 1958 to 1962, he served as first secretary (commercial) at Stockholm, before he went to Saigon as head of chancery. In 1964, he returned to the Foreign Office, was promoted to counsellor, and in 1966 was appointed head of South-East Asia Department. From 1969 to 1972, he served as counsellor at Tehran before he spent a year on sabbatical to the Royal College of Defence Studies.

From 1974 to 1976, Murray served as Ambassador to Libya before he returned to the Foreign Office as assistant under-secretary of state where he remained until 1980. In 1980, he was appointed Ambassador to Sweden, a post he held until his retirement in 1984. A highlight of his tenure was the Queen's state visit to Sweden in 1983.

After retiring from the Diplomatic Service, Murray served as complaints commissioner for the Channel Tunnel from 1987 to 1995. He worked for five years with the Soldiers, Sailors, Airmen and Families Association (SSAFA) and for three years as an assessor chairman of the Civil Service Selection Board. He was a trustee of the World Resource Foundation; was appointed Deputy Lieutenant of Kent; and held several directorships.

== Personal life and death ==
Murray married Marjorie Culverwell in 1949 and they had three sons and a daughter.

Murray died on 8 January 1998, aged 73.

== Honours ==
Murray was appointed Companion of the Order of St Michael and St George (CMG) in the 1973 New Year Honours. He was appointed Knight Commander of the Royal Victorian Order (KCVO) in 1983. In 1983, he was awarded the Grand Cross, Order of North Star of Sweden.

== See also ==
- Libya–United Kingdom relations
- Sweden–United Kingdom relations

Diplomatic posts
Preceded by Peter Tripp	British Ambassador to Libya; 1974–1976	Succeeded by Anthony Williams
Preceded by Sir Jeffrey Petersen	British Ambassador to Sweden; 1980–1984	Succeeded by Sir Richard Parsons
