= Raúl Alberto Quijano =

Argentine lawyer and diplomat

Minister of Foreign Affairs of the Republic of Argentina
- In office 19 January 1976 – 24 March 1976
- President: Isabel Perón
- Preceded by: Manuel Arauz Castex
- Succeeded by: César Augusto Guzzetti (de facto)

Personal details
- Born: 13 December 1923 Buenos Aires, Argentina
- Died: 14 April 2006 (aged 82) Buenos Aires, Argentina
- Party: Justicialist
- Spouse: Elia Guerra de Quijano
- Occupation: Lawyer, diplomat

Raúl Alberto Quijano (13 December 1923 – 14 April 2006) was an Argentine lawyer and diplomat who served as foreign minister during the last months of the administration of President Isabel Perón.

== Early years ==
Raúl Alberto Quijano was born in Buenos Aires on 13 December 1923. He qualified as a lawyer at the University of Buenos Aires in 1946 and did postgraduate work at Columbia University in the United States. He joined the National Foreign Service in 1947 as an embassy aide and was promoted to the official grade of ambassador in 1967. He worked at the Permanent Mission to the United Nations, at the Argentine embassy in India, the Consulate General in Pakistan and in the Legation in South Africa.

== Foreign minister ==
When Quijano became Foreign Minister of the government of Isabel Perón he was well known in the United States, and the president counted on obtaining the goodwill of that country. His first action was to meet with Secretary of State Henry Kissinger, who told him of the good intentions of his country but would not commit to anything, apparently expecting the coup that soon ended the Peronist government.

Relations over the status of the Falkland Islands had been increasingly tense. On 17 January 1976, the British Ambassador, Derick Ashe presented a note to Quijano from James Callaghan, the British foreign secretary. In it, Callaghan said that the dispute over sovereignty of the islands was "unproductive". Quijano's response was to recall the Ambassador of Argentina to Britain and demand the withdrawal of Ashe from Argentina.

Quijano also continued contacts with neighboring countries, signing agreements with Uruguay, Paraguay, and Bolivia. Relations with Brazil, however, were colored by mistrust and mutual recriminations due to the increased smuggling across the borders between the two countries. His administration ended on 24 March 1976 with the military coup that overthrew the president.

== Later career ==
After leaving the Foreign Ministry Quijano continued to serve in multilateral organizations: he was a member of the Expert Committee for the Study of the Finances of the United Nations, Chairman of the International Civil Service Commission and member of the Joint Inspection Unit of the United Nations and of specialized agencies based in Geneva. Later he was Permanent Representative of Argentina to the Organization of American States.

He died in Buenos Aires on 14 April 2006.
