= Roger Allen (diplomat) =

British diplomat

Allen in March 1957.

Sir Roger Allen KCMG (17 August 1909 – 9 February 1972) was a British diplomat who was ambassador to Greece, Iraq and Turkey.

== Career ==
Roger Allen was educated at Repton School and studied modern languages at Corpus Christi College, Cambridge. He then studied law at the Inner Temple and was called to the bar in 1937. During World War II he served as a temporary staff member at the Foreign Office; after the war he stayed on in the Foreign Service and served two years at Moscow before returning to London.

Allen was deputy British High Commissioner in West Germany in 1954. After the end of the Allied occupation regime and the restoration of German sovereignty in 1954, the British High Commission in Bonn became the British Embassy and Allen was Minister (deputy head of mission) 1955–56. He was Ambassador to Greece 1957–61 and Ambassador to Iraq 1961–65. While in Iraq he is reported have been aware of, or even supported, a plot against the Prime Minister Abd al-Karim Qasim which culminated in the February 1963 coup d'état in which Qasim was overthrown and killed.

Allen was Deputy Under-Secretary of State (Middle East and Africa) at the Foreign Office 1965–67, and Ambassador to Turkey 1967–69. He then retired from the Diplomatic Service and was director-general of the Middle East Association (a British business group) from 1970 until his death.

== Honours ==
Allen was appointed CMG in 1950 and knighted KCMG in the New Year Honours of 1957.

Diplomatic posts
Preceded by Sir Charles Peake	Ambassador Extraordinary and Plenipotentiary at Athens; 1957–1961	Succeeded by Sir Ralph Murray
Preceded by Sir Humphrey Trevelyan	Ambassador Extraordinary and Plenipotentiary at Baghdad; 1961–1965	Succeeded by Sir Richard Beaumont
Preceded by Sir Denis Allen	Ambassador Extraordinary and Plenipotentiary at Ankara; 1967–1969	Succeeded by Sir Roderick Sarell
