= Reginald Secondé =

British diplomat (1922–2017)

Sir Reginald Louis Secondé KCMG CVO (28 July 1922 – 26 October 2017) was a British diplomat who served as Ambassador to Chile, Romania and Venezuela. He was the son of Lt-Colonel Emile Charles Secondé and Dorothy Kathleen (née Sutherland). On 4 June 1951, he married Catherine Penelope Sneyd-Kynnersley (9 October 1919 – June 2004).

Secondé was educated at Beaumont and King's College, Cambridge. He served during the Second World War as a Major in the Coldstream Guards.

Predeceased by his wife, Secondé had one son, two daughters and grandchildren. He died on 26 October 2017 at the age of 95.

Diplomatic posts
Preceded by David Hildyard	British Ambassador to Chile; 1973–76	Succeeded by No representation – until John Heath
Preceded by Jeffrey Petersen	British Ambassador to Romania; 1977–79	Succeeded by Paul Holmer
Preceded by Sir Jock Taylor	British Ambassador to Venezuela; 1979–82	Succeeded by Hugh Carless
