= Peter Tibber =

British diplomat

Peter Tibber CMG
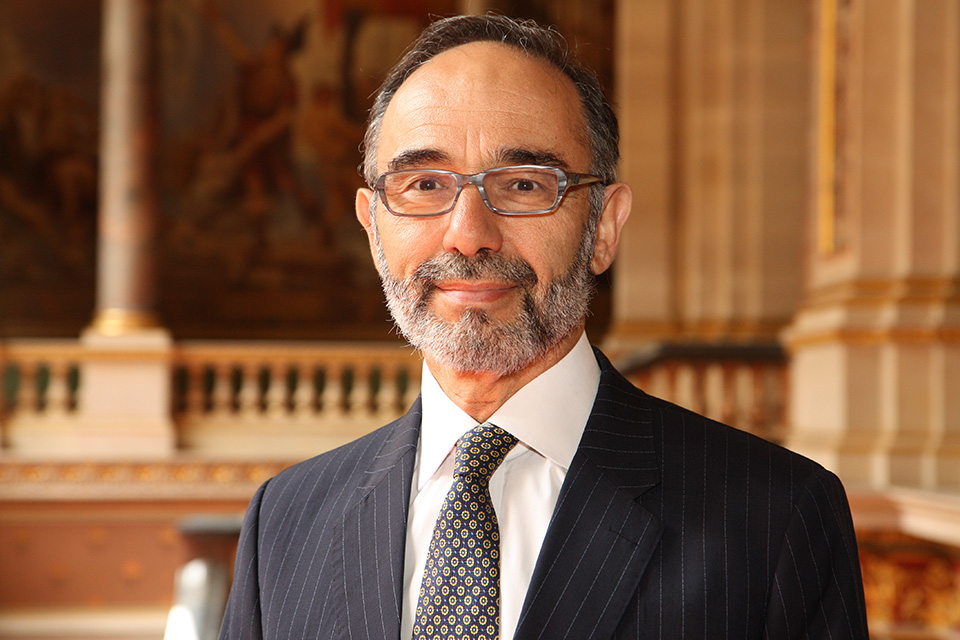

British Ambassador to Colombia
- In office 2015–2019
- Monarch: Elizabeth II
- Preceded by: Lindsay Croisdale-Appleby
- Succeeded by: Colin Martin-Reynolds

British Ambassador to Sudan
- In office 2011–2015
- Monarch: Elizabeth II
- Preceded by: Nicholas Kay
- Succeeded by: Michael Aron

Personal details
- Born: Peter Harris Tibber; September 7, 1956 (age 70)
- Children: Joachim Tibber
- Education: University College, Oxford

Peter Tibber CMG (born 7 September 1956) is a British diplomat, who was the British ambassador to Sudan from 2011 to 2015 and the British ambassador to Colombia from 2015 to 2019.

== Early life ==
Peter Harris Tibber was born on 7 September 1956. He is the son of Anthony Harris Tibber, a circuit judge. He was educated at Haberdashers’ Aske’s School, a private school in Elstree, Hertfordshire. Tibber attended University College, Oxford and graduated with a degree in history in 1976.

== Career ==
=== Ambassador to Sudan ===
Tibber was the British ambassador to Sudan from 2011 to 2015.

=== Ambassador to Colombia ===
Tibber was the British ambassador to Colombia from 2015 to 2019.

In the 2020 Birthday Honours, he was appointed a Companion of the Order of St Michael and St George for "services to British foreign policy".

== Personal life ==
Tibber married Eve Levy-Huet in 1983.
