= Peter Hill (civil servant) =

British civil servant and political advisor

Peter Hill CB CVO
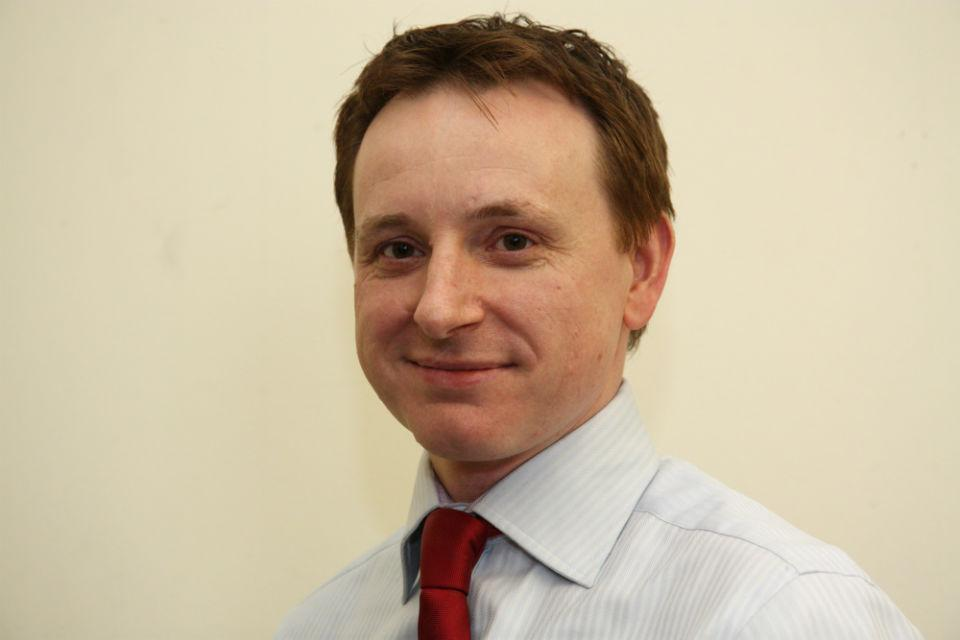

Principal Private Secretary to the Prime Minister
- In office 10 May 2017 – 1 October 2019
- Prime Minister: Theresa May; Boris Johnson
- Preceded by: Simon Case
- Succeeded by: Martin Reynolds

Foreign Office Director of Strategy
- In office May 2013 – 10 May 2017
- Prime Minister: David Cameron; Theresa May
- Preceded by: Alex Ellis
- Succeeded by: Liane Saunders

Peter Thomas Marshall Hill CB CVO is a British civil servant and a former political adviser. He was appointed CEO of the 26th United Nations Climate Change Conference of the Parties (COP26) in September 2019, having previously been Principal Private Secretary to the Prime Minister.

Hill worked within Peter Mandelson's and his successor Catherine Ashton's cabinet when they were the European Trade Commissioner between 2006 and 2009.

Following the Conservative Party's return to government in 2010, Hill worked in the office for security and counter-terrorism when Theresa May was Home Secretary. In 2013, Hill moved from the Home Office to work in the Foreign Office as the Director of Strategy to three former Foreign Secretaries: William Hague, Philip Hammond and Boris Johnson.

The Prime Minister, Theresa May, appointed Peter Hill as her Principal Private Secretary in May 2017 following his predecessor Simon Case's appointment as the Director General for the UK-EU Partnership, to coordinate the process of the consequences of invoking Article 50 of the Treaty on European Union. Hill resigned after Boris Johnson's election as May's successor on 24 July 2019, but remained in the post until his successor was announced.

Hill was appointed a Commander of the Order of the Bath by Prime Minister Theresa May in her 2019 Resignation Honours List, and was further appointed Commander of the Royal Victorian Order (CVO) in the 2020 Birthday Honours for services to the Royal Household.

== See also ==
- Principal Private Secretary to the Prime Minister
- Prime Minister's Office

Government offices
Preceded by Simon Case	Principal Private Secretary to the Prime Minister; 2017–2019	Succeeded by Martin Reynolds
Preceded by Alex Ellis	Foreign Office Director of Strategy; 2013–2017	Succeeded by Liane Saunders
