= Kathryn Lamb =

British cartoonist and writer (born 1959)

- Born: 1959 (age 66–67)
- Education: University of Oxford

Kathryn Jane Lamb (born 1959) is a British cartoonist, illustrator and writer.

Lamb is the daughter of Sir Archie Lamb, a former British Ambassador to Kuwait and Norway. She was educated at St Hugh's College, Oxford where she received a bachelor's degree in English Literature.

Her work was published by Private Eye in 1979, while she was still a student. In addition to Private Eye, she has contributed cartoons to The Spectator and The Lady.

Lamb has written and illustrated numerous books including the Alex and Best Mates Forever series for teenagers, and Eco-Worriers, a series for younger readers.

She lives in Gillingham, Dorset, with her six children and five cats. She currently illustrates Pseuds Corner in Private Eye and her illustrations appear in The Oldie.
