= Michael Aron =

British diplomat

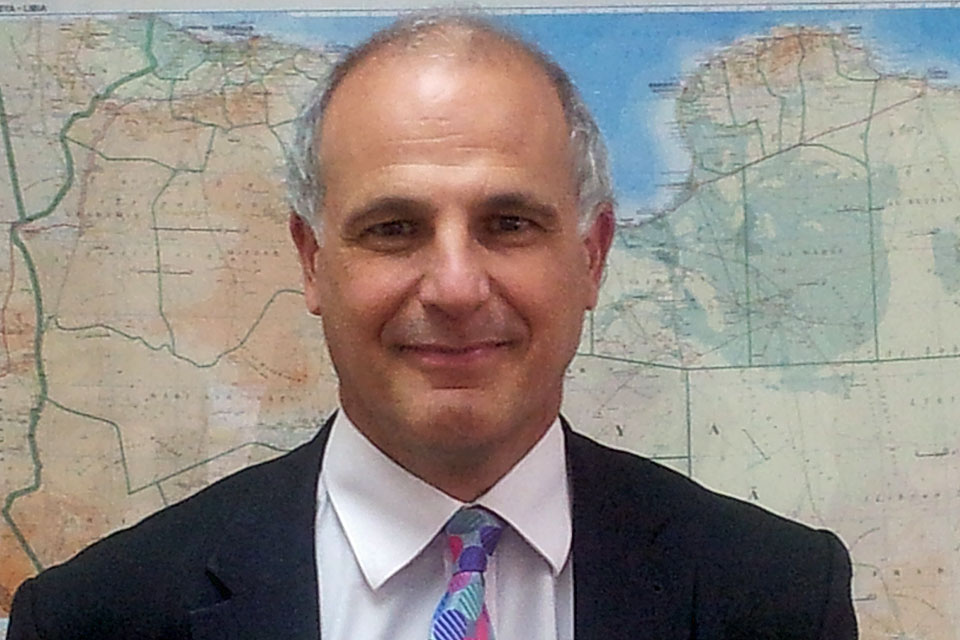

British Ambassador to Yemen
- In office February 2018 – August 2021
- Monarchs: Elizabeth II; Charles III
- Prime Minister: Theresa May; Boris Johnson; Liz Truss
- Preceded by: Simon Shercliff
- Succeeded by: Richard Oppenheim

British Ambassador to Sudan
- In office 2015–2018
- Monarch: Elizabeth II
- Prime Minister: David Cameron; Theresa May
- Preceded by: Peter Tibber
- Succeeded by: Irfan Siddiq

British Ambassador to Libya
- In office 2013–2015
- Monarch: Elizabeth II
- Prime Minister: David Cameron
- Preceded by: Sir Dominic Asquith
- Succeeded by: Peter Millett

British Ambassador to Iraq
- In office 2011–2012
- Monarch: Elizabeth II
- Prime Minister: David Cameron
- Preceded by: John Jenkins
- Succeeded by: Simon Collis

British Ambassador to Kuwait
- In office 2008–2009
- Monarch: Elizabeth II
- Prime Minister: Gordon Brown
- Preceded by: Stuart Laing
- Succeeded by: Frank Baker

Personal details
- Born: Michael Douglas Aron; 22 March 1959 (age 67)
- Spouse: Rachel Barker (divorced)
- Children: 4
- Education: Exeter School; University of Leeds; Polytechnic of Central London
- Occupation: Diplomat

Michael Douglas Aron (born 22 March 1959) is a British diplomat who has been Ambassador to Kuwait, Iraq, Libya and Sudan, and Yemen.

== Career ==
Aron was educated at Exeter School, Leeds University and the Polytechnic of Central London. He taught English in Sudan before joining the Foreign and Commonwealth Office (FCO) in 1984. He has served at New York, Brasília and Brussels. He was Ambassador to Kuwait 2008–09, Head of the Middle East Department at the FCO 2010–11, Ambassador to Iraq 2011–12, acting Head of Mission at Tripoli September 2012 to January 2013, and Ambassador to Libya from January 2013 until June 2015.

After the outbreak of the Libyan Civil War in 2014, Aron supervised the evacuation of British citizens from Tripoli on the Royal Navy survey ship HMS Enterprise. He and his remaining staff then closed the embassy and left Libya to set up a temporary office in Tunis.

In April 2015, Aron was appointed Ambassador to the Republic of Sudan, and took up the appointment in August of that year. In February 2018 he was transferred at short notice to be Ambassador to Yemen.

After completing his time as Ambassador to Yemen, Aron returned to the FCDO, London in July 2021 and retired from the Diplomatic Service in October 2022.

Since October 2022, Aron has been Chief International Affairs Officer of the Yemeni family-owned conglomerate HSA Group.

== Family ==
Aron was married to Rachel (née Barker) who was also a diplomat, now retired after being British Ambassador to Belgium from 2007 to 2010. They have two sons and two daughters. They divorced in 2016.

Aron remarried in 2018 to Kate Orrick, who is currently Deputy Head of Mission at the British Embassy, Stockholm. They have one son and one daughter together.

Diplomatic posts
Preceded by Stuart Laing	British Ambassador to Kuwait; 2008–2009	Succeeded by Frank Baker
Preceded by John Jenkins	British Ambassador to Iraq; 2011–2012	Succeeded by Simon Collis
Preceded by Sir Dominic Asquith	British Ambassador to Libya; 2013–2015	Succeeded by Peter Millett
Preceded by Peter Tibber	British Ambassador to Sudan; 2015–2018	Succeeded by Irfan Siddiq
Preceded by Simon Shercliff	British Ambassador to Yemen; 2018–present	Incumbent
