= Derek Dodson (diplomat) =

British diplomat (1932–2000)

Sir Derek Dodson KCMG MC

British Ambassador to Turkey
- In office 1977–1980
- Preceded by: Sir Horace Phillips
- Succeeded by: Sir Peter Laurence

British Ambassador to Brazil
- In office 1973–1977
- Preceded by: Sir David Hunt
- Succeeded by: Sir Norman Statham

British Ambassador to Hungary
- In office 1970–1973
- Preceded by: Sir Guy Millard
- Succeeded by: The Hon. John Wilson

Personal details
- Born: 20 January 1920
- Died: 22 November 2003 (aged 83)
- Children: 2
- Occupation: Diplomat

Sir Derek Sherborne Lindsell Dodson (20 January 1920 – 22 November 2003) was a British diplomat. He served as British Ambassador to Hungary from 1970 to 1973; British Ambassador to Brazil from 1973 to 1977; and British Ambassador to Turkey from 1977 to 1980.

== Early life and education ==
Dodson was born on 20 January 1920 in Cambridge, the eldest son of Charles Sherborne Dodson, a doctor, and Irene Frances née Lindsell. He was educated at Stowe School and the Royal Military College, Sandhurst.

== Career ==
Dodson joined the Royal Scots Fusiliers in 1939 with the rank of 2nd Lieutenant and served with them until 1948. During World War II he served in India, and in 1941 transferred to the Special Operations Executive and served with partisans in Greece and Northern Italy. From 1945 to 1946, he was Military Assistant to the British Commissioner of the Allied Control Commission for Bulgaria, and from 1946 to 1947, general Staff Officer at the War Office. In 1945, he was awarded the Military Cross.

Dodson entered the Foreign Service in 1948, and served as acting vice-consul at Salonika in 1948; acting consul-general there in 1949 and 1950, and then secretary at Madrid in 1951. After two years at the Foreign Office, including as Private Secretary to the Minister of State for Foreign Affairs in 1955, he was sent to Prague, serving initially as first secretary and head of chancery, and subsequently as chargé d’affaires. In 1962, he was appointed consul at Elisabethville, a post he held for a year before he returned to the Foreign Office as head of the Central Department. He was then appointed counsellor at the British Embassy in Athens, remaining in the post from 1966 to 1969.

Dodson then served as Ambassador to Hungary from 1970 to 1973; Ambassador to Brazil from 1973–77; and Ambassador to Turkey from 1977 to 1980.

== Personal life and death ==
Dodson married first Julie Barnes in 1952 and they had a son and a daughter. After she died in 1992, he married Urania Massouridis née Papadam in 1997. From 1982 to 1995 he was chairman of the Anglo-Turkish Society, and between 1982 and 1998, he was a governor of the United World College of the Atlantic.

Dodson died on 22 November 2003, aged 83.

== Honours ==
Dodson was appointed Companion of the Order of St Michael and St George (CMG) in the 1963 Birthday Honours, and was promoted to Knight Commander (KCMG) in the 1975 Birthday Honours. In 1945, he was awarded the Military Cross (MC). Brazil awarded him the Order of the Southern Cross.

== See also ==
- Hungary–United Kingdom relations
- Brazil–United Kingdom relations
- Turkey–United Kingdom relations

Diplomatic posts
Preceded by Sir Guy Millard	British Ambassador to Hungary; 1970–1973	Succeeded by The Hon. John Wilson
Preceded by Sir David Hunt	British Ambassador to Brazil; 1973–1977	Succeeded by Sir Norman Statham
Preceded by Sir Horace Phillips	British Ambassador to Turkey; 1970–1973	Succeeded by Sir Peter Laurence
