= Derick Ashe =

British diplomat (1919–2000)

Derick Rosslyn Ashe
- Born: 20 January 1919; Guildford, Surrey
- Died: 4 May 2000 (aged 81)
- Occupation: Diplomat
- Known for: UN Conference of the Committee on Disarmament

Sir Derick Rosslyn Ashe KCMG (20 January 1919 – 4 May 2000) was a British diplomat who served as Ambassador to Romania, Ambassador to Argentina and represented Britain at the United Nations Conference of the Committee on Disarmament.

== Early career ==
Derick Rosslyn Ashe was born on 20 January 1919 in Guildford, Surrey. His parents were Frederick Allen and Rosalind Ashe. He attended Trinity College, Oxford. During World War II (1939–1945) Ashe served in the Oxfordshire and Buckinghamshire Light Infantry, which he joined on 5 July 1940. He campaigned with this unit in the Netherlands. In May 1947, as a temporary Captain of "the Ox and Bucks", he was made Knight of the Order of Orange-Nassau with Swords.

Ashe was appointed to the eighth grade of H.M. Foreign Service on 26 June 1947. He was a counsellor at Addis Ababa from 1962 to 1964. He advanced to the sixth grade on 5 November 1964. He served as a counsellor to the British H.M. embassy in Havana from 1964 to 1966. In June 1966 Ashe was made a C.M.G. He was head of the Security department of the Foreign and Commonwealth Office from 1966 to 1969. From 1969 to 1971 he was British Minister in Tokyo. Ashe was Ambassador to Romania from 1972 to 1975.

== Argentina ==
Ashe was appointed Ambassador to Argentina from March 1975 as tensions mounted between the British and Argentine governments which would eventually lead to the Falklands War in 1982. In April 1975, a car bomb was exploded outside the British embassy in Buenos Aires, killing a police guard. Ashe was unhurt.

In July 1975, James Callaghan, the British foreign secretary, wanted to limit discussions with Argentina to cooperation in developing the oil and fish resources, since a change in British public opinion would be needed before the government could agree to alter their position that the islanders would have to consent to any change in sovereignty. Ashe advised Callaghan that failure to offer serious discussion about sovereignty of the Falkland Islands "could be seen almost as an open invitation to invasion". On 17 January 1976 Ashe presented a note from Callaghan to Raúl Alberto Quijano, the Argentine Foreign Minister. In it Callaghan said that the dispute over sovereignty of the islands was "unproductive". Quijano's response was to recall the Ambassador of Argentina to Britain and demand the withdrawal of Ashe from Argentina.

== Disarmament Conference ==
Ashe was Ambassador to the Conference of the Committee on Disarmament from 1977 to 1979. The conference had difficulty finding a middle ground between the very different views of two superpowers and their allies on the one hand, and the non-aligned states on the other. After one of the sessions, Ashe said it had drawn greater attention to disarmament. However, he wished it could have pointed to agreement on one or more realistic ideas to produce specific results for enhancing international security. In assessing the achievements of that conference he said,

A little progress, although far too little, has been achieved. Many of us here are disappointed in the Final Document... But this is a far cry from saying that our efforts have failed... for the first time ever the whole world has been able to agree on a single document about disarmament.

Diplomatic posts
| Preceded by Denis Laskey | British Ambassador to Romania; 1972–1975 | Succeeded by Jeffrey Petersen |
| Preceded by Donald Hopson | British Ambassador to Argentina; 1975–1977 | Succeeded by Anthony Williams |
