= Anthony Williams (diplomat) =

British diplomat

Sir Anthony James Williams KCMG (28 May 1923 – 7 May 1990) was a British diplomat.

== Career ==
He attended Oundle School and Trinity College, Oxford, where he read Philosophy, politics and economics. From 1942 to 1943, he was employed by the Ministry of Home Security, and joined the Foreign Office in 1945. He served several overseas posts including being stationed in the UN offices in Geneva and New York, and was present in Egypt during the Suez Crisis in 1956.

He was Ambassador to Cambodia from 1970 to 1973, and then after a in Rome as Minister. He became Ambassador to Libya from 1977 to 1980, and Ambassador to Argentina from 1980 to 1982; his term in Argentina was disrupted by the Falklands War. During his retirement, he served as President of the Society for Libyan Studies.

Williams was grandson of the chancery lawyer Lord Wrenbury and nephew of Sir Denys Burton Buckley. He married on 11 April 1955 in Cairo to German noblewoman Countess Hedwig von Neipperg (born 1929), daughter of Count Erwin von Neipperg and his wife, Countess Hissa von Hatzfeldt zu Trachenberg. They had four children.

Diplomatic posts
Preceded by Harold Brown	British Ambassador to Cambodia; 1970–1973	Succeeded by John Powell-Jones
Preceded by Donald Murray	British Ambassador to Libya; 1977–1980	Succeeded by Michael Edes
Preceded by Derick Ashe	British Ambassador to Argentina; 1980–1982	Succeeded by Falklands War
