= Mark Russell (diplomat) =

British diplomat (1929–2005)

Sir Mark Russell KCMG

British Ambassador to Turkey
- In office 1983–1986
- Preceded by: Sir Peter Laurence
- Succeeded by: Sir Timothy Daunt

Personal details
- Born: 3 September 1929 Scotland
- Died: 11 July 2005 (aged 75)
- Children: 4
- Education: Exeter College, Oxford
- Occupation: Diplomat

Sir Robert Mark Russell (3 September 1929 – 11 July 2005) was a British diplomat who served as Ambassador to Turkey from 1983 to 1986.

== Early life and education ==
Russell was born on 3 September 1929 in Scotland, the son of Sir Robert Russell who had a distinguished career in the Indian Civil Service. He was educated at Trinity College, Glenalmond and Exeter College, Oxford.

== Career ==
After National Service with the Royal Artillery from 1952 to 1954, Russell joined the Foreign Service and spent two years in London. He was then sent to Budapest, serving as secretary from 1956 to 1958 and there witnessed the turmoil of the Hungarian Uprising. After three years as secretary in Berne, he returned to the Foreign Office where he remained from 1961 to 1965. He was then appointed secretary and head of chancery at Kabul, serving from 1965 to 1967. After serving at the diplomatic service's administration office from 1967 to 1969, he was deputy head of personnel of the operations department at the Foreign and Commonwealth Office from 1969 to 1970.

Russell then served as commercial counsellor at Bucharest from 1970 to 1973, and counsellor at Washington from 1974 to 1978 and as head of chancery there from 1977 to 1978, before he returned to the Foreign and Commonwealth Office as assistant under-secretary of state. After serving as deputy chief clerk and chief inspector of the diplomatic service from 1978 to 1982, he was appointed Ambassador to Turkey, serving in the post from 1983 to 1986. According to The Times, "Russell reinforced a close but complicated relationship with Turkey and helped to build Britain's commercial position there." He ended his career at the Foreign and Commonwealth Office serving as deputy under-secretary of state and chief clerk from 1986 to 1989.

== Personal life and death ==
Russell married Virginia Rogers in 1954 and they had two sons and two daughters.

Russell died on 11 July 2005, aged 75.

== Honours ==
Russell was appointed Companion of the Order of St Michael and St George (CMG) in the 1977 Birthday Honours, and was promoted to Knight Commander (KCMG) in the 1985 New Year Honours.

== See also ==
Turkey–United Kingdom relations

Diplomatic posts
Preceded by Sir Peter Laurence	British Ambassador to Turkey; 1983–1986	Succeeded by Sir Timothy Daunt
