= Shunsaku Kudō =

Japanese naval officer (1901-1979)

- 工藤 俊作
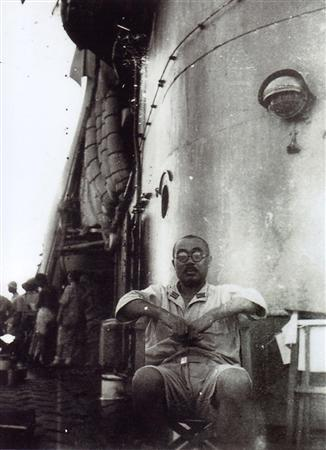
- Born: January 7, 1901; Higashiokitama District, Yamagata, Japan
- Died: January 12, 1979 (aged 78); Kawaguchi, Saitama, Japan
- Military career
- Allegiance: Empire of Japan
- Branch: Imperial Japanese Navy
- Service years: 1923–1945
- Rank: Commander
- Unit: Combined Fleet
- Commands: Hatakaze; Ikazuchi; Hatsuharu; Hibiki

Commander Shunsaku Kudō (工藤 俊作, Kudō Shunsaku; January 7, 1901 – January 12, 1979) was an officer in the Imperial Japanese Navy. He is notable for the humanitarian act of rescuing 442 enemy British and American sailors from the Java Sea in 1942.

== Biography ==
Born in 1901, Kudō graduated from the Imperial Japanese Naval Academy in 1923 and was assigned to the light cruiser Yubari as a midshipman, followed by the battleship Nagato in October 1924. He was commissioned in December 1924, was promoted to the rank of Second Lieutenant in 1926, and took his first command, the destroyer Hatakaze, in 1929. He assumed command of Ikazuchi in November 1940.

=== Rescue of 442 enemy sailors ===
On March 2, 1942, Lieutenant Commander Kudō ordered Ikazuchi to rescue 442 survivors from the Royal Navy destroyer HMS Encounter and United States Navy destroyer USS Pope. These ships had been sunk the previous day, along with HMS Exeter, in the Java Sea between Java and Borneo, off the Indonesian port of Soerabaja. The survivors had been adrift for some 20 hours, in rafts and lifejackets or clinging to floats, many coated in oil and unable to see. Among the rescued was Sir Sam Falle, later a British diplomat. This humanitarian decision by Lieutenant Commander Kudō placed the Ikazuchi at risk of submarine attack, and interfered with her fighting ability due to the sheer numbers of rescued sailors. The action was later the subject of books and a 2007 TV program.

== Post-war life ==
After the war, Kudō left the navy and moved to Kawaguchi, Saitama. In 1979, he died of stomach cancer. Sir Sam Falle, one of the survivors rescued by Kudō in 1942, visited Kudō's grave in 2008.
