= Norman Statham =

British diplomat (1922–2001)

Sir Norman Statham KCMG CVO

British Ambassador to Brazil
- In office 1977–1979
- Preceded by: Sir Derek Dodson
- Succeeded by: George Edmund Hall

Personal details
- Born: 15 August 1922
- Died: 10 November 2001 (aged 79)
- Children: 3
- Education: Gonville and Caius College, Cambridge
- Occupation: Diplomat

Sir Norman Statham (15 August 1922 – 10 November 2001) was a British diplomat who served as British Ambassador to Brazil from 1977 to 1979.

== Early life and education ==
Statham was born on 15 August 1922 at Stretford, Lancashire. He was educated at Seymour Park Council School, Stretford; Manchester Grammar School; and Gonville and Caius College, Cambridge, where he studied Modern Languages.

== Career ==
After serving in the British Army in the Intelligence Corps from 1943 to 1947, and working in business in Manchester for several years, Statham joined the Foreign Office. He was vice-consul and later consul in New York in 1954, and then first secretary (commercial) Bonn in 1958. After attending the Administrative Staff College in Henley in 1963, the following year he was counsellor and head of the European integration department at the Foreign Office in 1965.

In 1968, Statham was appointed Consul-General in São Paulo, before he returned to the European integration department in 1970. While at the department he prepared the groundwork for Britain's successful application for European Community membership which had previously been blocked by France. After his second posting to Bonn in 1971, this time as minister (economic), he was appointed in 1975 as Deputy Under-Secretary of Economic Affairs, one of the top positions at the Foreign Office. In 1977, he was appointed British Ambassador to Brazil, and remained in the post until his retirement in 1979.

== Personal life and death ==
Statham married Austrian-born Hedwig Gerlich in 1948 and they had two sons and a daughter. In retirement Statham was vice-president of the British Chamber of Commerce in Germany. He served as President of the Council of British Chambers of Commerce in Continental Europe, and was the Foreign and Commonwealth Office's Special Representative for British-German Co-operation.

Statham died on 10 November 2001, aged 79.

== Honours ==
Statham was appointed Companion of the Order of St Michael and St George (CMG) in the 1967 Birthday Honours, and promoted to Knight Commander in the 1977 Birthday Honours. In 1968, he was appointed Commander of the Royal Victorian Order (CVO).

== See also ==
- Brazil–United Kingdom relations

Diplomatic posts
Preceded by Sir Derek Dodson	British Ambassador to Brazil; 1977–1979	Succeeded by George Edmund Hall
