= List of ambassadors of the United Kingdom to Sweden =

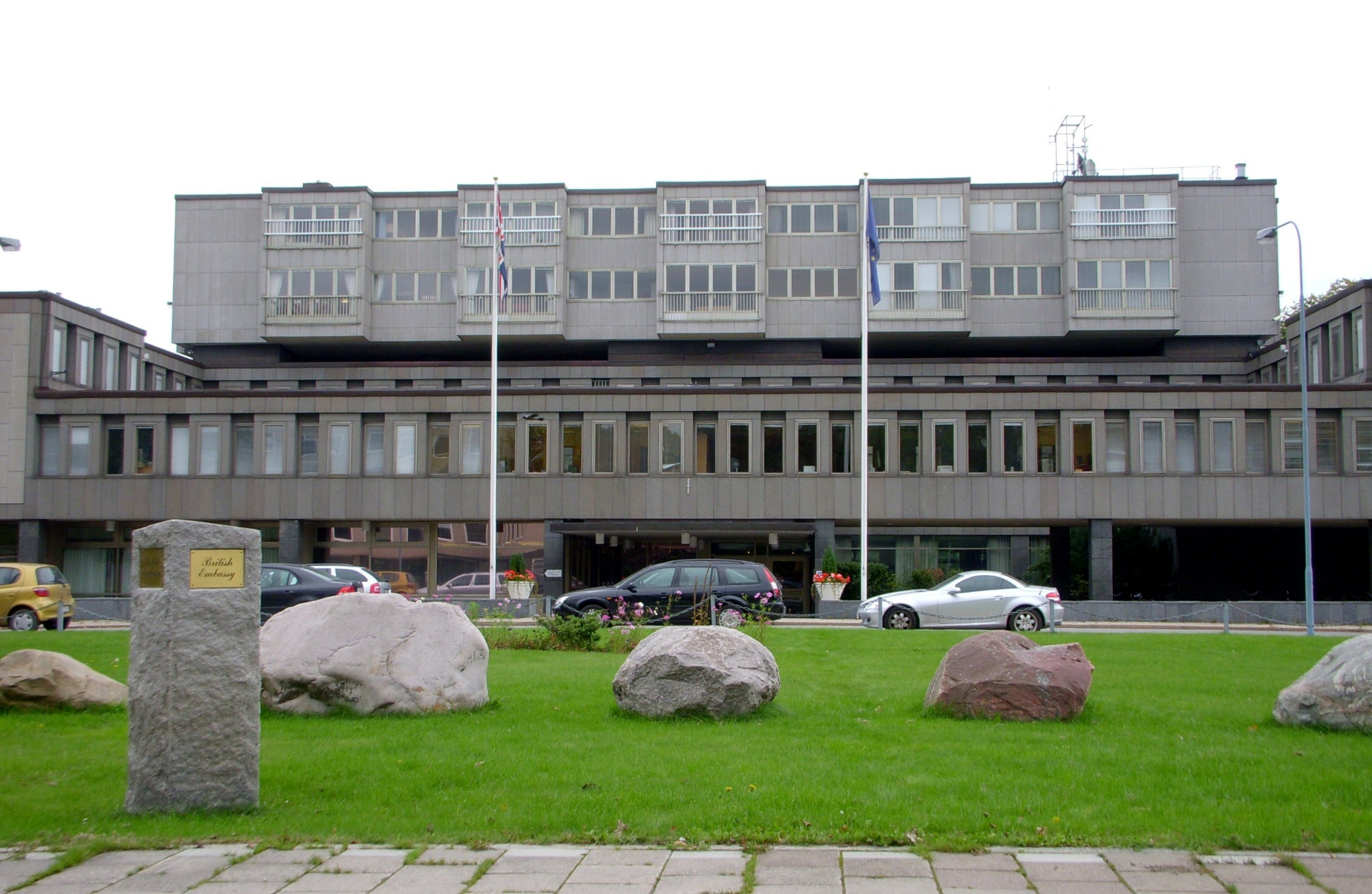
The British Embassy in Stockholm

The ambassador of the United Kingdom to Sweden is the United Kingdom's foremost diplomatic representative in Sweden, and head of the UK's diplomatic mission in Stockholm. The official title is His Britannic Majesty's Ambassador to the Kingdom of Sweden.

== Earlier representation ==
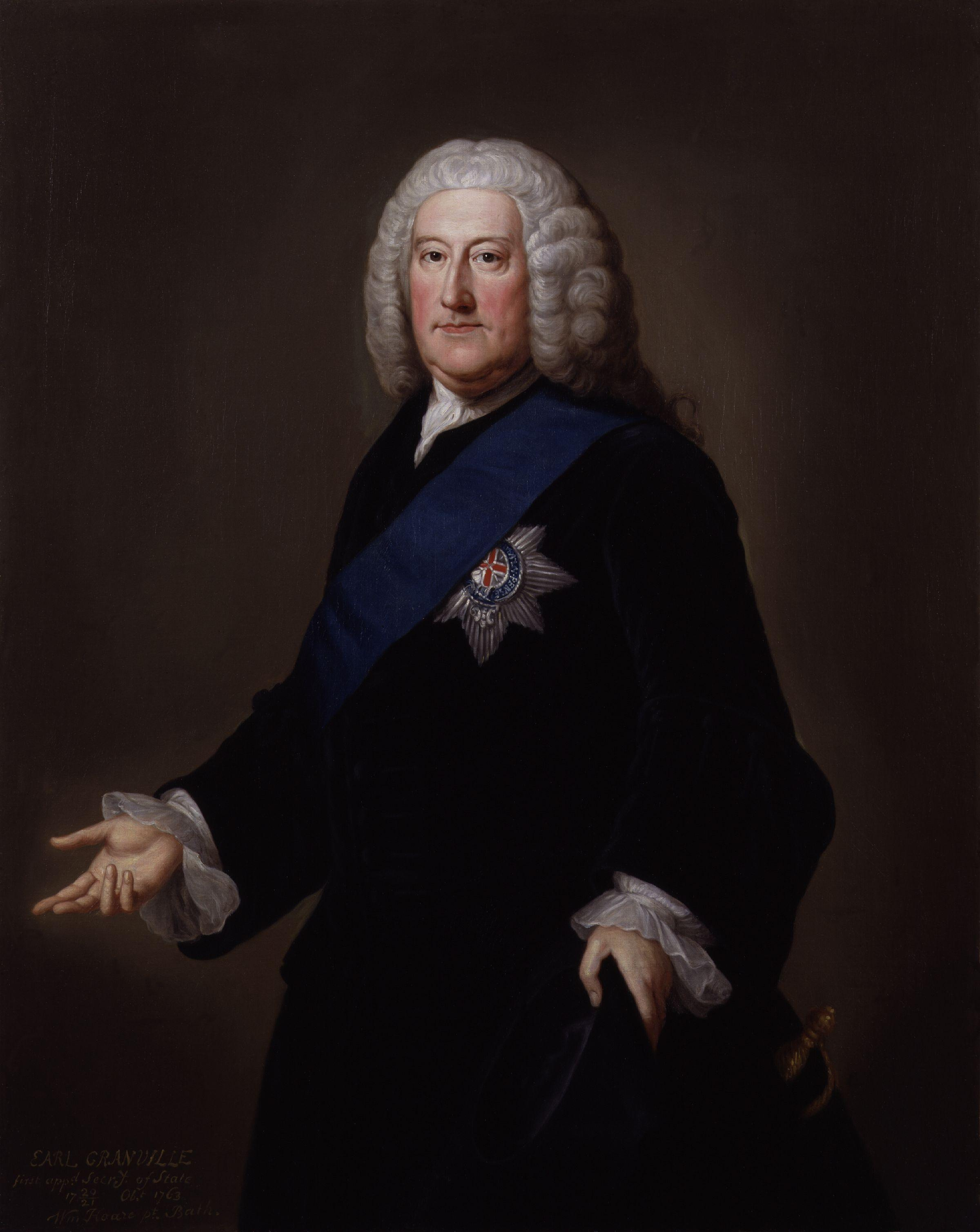
John Carteret, 2nd Earl Granville

For ambassadors from the Court of St. James's to Sweden before the creation of the United Kingdom of Great Britain and Ireland in 1801, see List of ambassadors of the Kingdom of England to Sweden (up to 1707) and List of ambassadors of Great Britain to Sweden (from 1707 to 1800).

== List of heads of mission ==
=== Envoys extraordinary and ministers plenipotentiary ===
==== Court of Stockholm ====
- 1800–1801: Diplomatic relations severed due to Second League of Armed Neutrality
- 1802–1804: Charles Arbuthnot
- 1804–1807: Hon. Henry Pierrepont
- 1807: Alexander Straton
  - 1807: Hon. Henry Pierrepont special mission
- 1807–1808: Edward Thornton
- 1808–1809: Anthony Merry
- 1810–1812: Diplomatic relations severed due to Sweden's alliance with France
  - 1811: Edward Thornton special mission
- 1812–1817: Edward Thornton
- 1817–1820: Viscount Strangford
- 1820–1823: William Vesey-FitzGerald
- 1823–1832: Benjamin Bloomfield, 1st Baron Bloomfield (created a baron in 1825)
- 1832–1833: Lord Howard de Walden
- 1833–1835: Sir Edward Cromwell Disbrowe
- 1835–1838: Hon. John Duncan Bligh
- 1838–1850: Sir Thomas Cartwright
  - 1850: George John Robert Gordon, Chargé d'affaires
- 1851–1853: Sir Edmund Lyons

==== King of Sweden and Norway ====
- 1854–1859: Arthur Magenis
- 1859–1872: George Jerningham
- 1872–1881: Hon. Edward Erskine
- 1881–1884: Sir Horace Rumbold, Bt
- 1884–1888: Edwin Corbett
- 1888–1893: Francis Richard Plunkett
- 1893–1896: Sir Spenser St. John
- 1896–1901: Hon. Sir Francis Pakenham
- 1902–1904: Sir William Barrington
- 1904–1905: Rennell Rodd

==== King of Sweden ====
- 1905–1908: Sir Rennell Rodd
- 1908–1912: Cecil Spring Rice
- 1913–1918: Esme Howard
- 1919–1924: Sir Colville Barclay
- 1924–1927: Arthur Grant Duff
- 1928–1930: Sir Tudor Vaughan
- 1931–1934: Sir Archibald Clark Kerr
- 1935–1937: Sir Michael Palairet
- 1938–1939: Sir Edmund Monson, 3rd Baronet
- 1939–1945: Sir Victor Mallet
- 1945–1948: Sir Bertrand Jerram

=== Ambassadors to Sweden ===
- 1948–1951: Sir Harold Farquhar
- 1951–1954: Sir Roger Stevens
- 1954–1960: Hon. Sir Robert Hankey
- 1960–1963: Sir John Coulson
- 1963–1966: Sir Moore Crosthwaite
- 1966–1971: Sir Archibald Ross
- 1971–1974: Sir Guy Millard
- 1974–1977: Sir Sam Falle
- 1977–1980: Sir Jeffrey Petersen
- 1980–1984: Sir Donald Murray
- 1984–1987: Sir Richard Parsons
- 1987–1991: Sir John Ure
- 1991–1995: Robert Cormack
- 1995–1999: Sir Roger Bone
- 1999–2003: John Grant CMG (later Sir John Grant KCMG)
- 2003–2006: Anthony Cary
- 2006–2011: Andrew Jonathan Mitchell
- 2011–2015: Paul Johnston
- 2015–2019: David Cairns
- 2019-2024: Judith Gough
- 2024–present: Samantha Job
