= List of ambassadors of the United Kingdom to Kuwait =

The ambassador of the United Kingdom to Kuwait is the United Kingdom's foremost diplomatic representative in the State of Kuwait, and head of the UK's diplomatic mission in Kuwait. The official title is His Britannic Majesty's Ambassador to the State of Kuwait.

The Sheikhdom of Kuwait became a British protectorate in 1899 after an agreement was signed between Sheikh Mubarak Al-Sabah and the British government in India, due to severe threats to Kuwait's independence from the Ottoman Empire. The British government was represented by Political Agents who were appointed by the Indian Political Service until 1948, then by the Foreign Office. In 1961 Kuwait became independent and the last political agent, John Richmond, became the first British ambassador to Kuwait.

== Heads of mission ==
=== Political agents ===
- 1904–1909: Stuart Knox
- 1909–1914: William Shakespear
- 1914–1916: William Grey
- 1916–1918: Robert Hamilton
- Mar–Sep 1918: Percy Loch
- 1918–1920: Daniel McCollum
- 1920–1929: James More
- 1929–1936: Harold Dickson
- 1936–1939: Gerald de Gaury
- 1939–1941: Arnold Galloway
- May–Aug 1941: Harold Dickson
- 1941–1943: Tom Hickinbotham
- 1943–1944: Cornelius Pelly
- 1944–1945: Gordon Jackson
- 1945–1946: Maurice Tandy
- Mar–May 1946: Richard Bird
- 1946–1948: Maurice Tandy
- 1947–1951: Herbert George Jakins
- 1951–1955: Cornelius Pelly
- 1955–1957: Gawain Bell
- 1957–1959: Aubrey Halford-MacLeod
- 1959–1961: John Richmond

=== Ambassadors ===
- 1961–1963: Sir John Richmond
- 1963–1967: Noel Jackson
- 1967–1968: Geoffrey Arthur
- 1968–1970: Sir Sam Falle
- 1970–1974: Sir John Wilton
- 1974–1977: Sir Archie Lamb
- 1977–1982: Sydney Cambridge
- 1982–1985: Sir Ramsay Melhuish
- 1985–1987: Sir Peter Moon
- 1987–1990: Peter Hinchcliffe
- 1990–1992: Sir Michael Weston
- 1992–1996: William Fullerton
- 1996–1999: Sir Graham Boyce
- 1999–2002: Sir Richard Muir
- 2002–2005: Chris Wilton
- 2005–2008: Stuart Laing
- 2008–2010: Michael Aron
- 2010–2014: Frank Baker
- 2014–2017: Matthew Lodge
- 2017–2021: Michael Davenport
- 2021–2025: Belinda Lewis
- 2025–present: Qudsi Rasheed
