= Vincent Fean =

British diplomat

Sir Vincent Fean KCVO
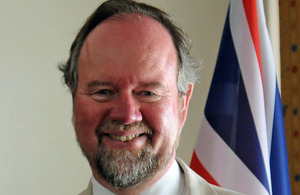
- Born: Thomas Vincent Fean; 20 November 1952 (age 73); Burnley, Lancashire, England, UK
- Education: St Theodore's RC High School, Burnley; University of Sheffield
- Occupations: British diplomat and former Ambassador
- Spouse: Anne
- Children: Two daughters and one son

Sir Vincent Fean KCVO (born 20 November 1952) is a retired British diplomat and former Ambassador.

== Early life ==
Thomas Vincent Fean was born in Burnley, Lancashire, England. He was educated at St Theodore's RC High School in Burnley and, from 1971 to 1975. at the University of Sheffield where he obtained a BA Honours degree in French and German.

== Diplomatic career ==
Fean joined the Diplomatic Service in 1975 and retired from it in 2014. His career included appointments as High Commissioner to Malta (2002–06), Ambassador to Libya (2006–10), and Consul General to Jerusalem (de facto ambassador to the Occupied Palestinian Territories) from 2010 to 2014.

== Awards and honours ==
He was appointed Knight Commander of the Royal Victorian Order in 2005.

He is an Officer of the Order of St John.

In July 2010, he received an honorary degree from the University of Sheffield.

== Controversy ==
Fean was Ambassador to Libya during the 2009 release of Pan Am Flight 103 bomber Abdelbaset al-Megrahi. In information released in the 2010 Wikileaks cables, he was attributed as saying that "they could have cut us off at the knees" in relation to likely Libyan government actions against UK interests in the country, should Megrahi die in prison in Scotland.

== Views on recognition of Palestine ==
In December 2014 The New York Times published an opinion piece by Fean in which outlined what he believes are requirements for a peaceful solution to the Israeli-Palestinian conflict. He argues in the article that European countries such as Britain, Spain, France, Ireland as well as the European Parliament are working to promote coexistence between Israelis and Palestinians, and to that end are considering recognition of Palestine as "a contribution to a negotiated peace, not a substitute for it.

== Personal life ==
He and his wife Anne have two daughters and one son.
