= Charles Stewart (diplomat) =

British diplomat

Andrew Charles Stewart (22 April 1907 – 1 January 1979) was a British diplomat, Ambassador to Iceland and Libya. He was recalled by Ivor Lucas as "a congenial soul with an 'Indian' background and some Arab experience", and not generally "particularly zealous in the exercise of his official functions". However, "when duty called", according to Lucas, he "could be very effective."

Born in Hull, Charles Stewart was educated at Scarborough College and the Royal Military College, Sandhurst, and entered the British Indian Army in 1927. However, he transferred to the Indian Political Service in 1933, and in 1947 entered the Foreign Service. He was Consul to Oman from December 1945 to June 1947, and again from August 1947 to August 1948. He was Counsellor to Indonesia from 1950 to 1952, Counsellor to the Netherlands from 1952 to 1954, and British Minister to Korea from 1954 to 1956. As Consul-General to Jerusalem from 1957 to 1959, he reported Palestinian indifference to the uniting of Iraq and Jordan as the Arab Federation:

The Arabs are an emotional people who love celebration, yet the establishment of the Arab Federation aroused less spontaneous rejoicing than is normal during any of the Muslim holidays.

Stewart was Ambassador to Iceland from 1959 to 1961, and Ambassador to Libya from 1962 to 1963. He was forced to retire in 1963, "the victim of a pernicious Treasury practice":

Members of the Service who had spent time in 'difficult' climates were entitled to count each year of such service as 18 months for the purpose of calculating pensionable age. The Treasury turned this on its head by requiring officers to retire when they reached the 'notional' age of 60. Stewart was coasting along in the belief that he still had another couple of years to go when he received, out of the blue, a letter from the Foreign Office informing him that he would be retiring within a matter of months. To add insult to injury, the day on which he finally left Tripoli and the Service was an appallingly wet one. His aircraft was diverted from Idris to Wheelus and then delayed there. By the time he eventually took off, the farewell party of friends and colleagues had gradually dwindled to one saddened Head of Chancery.

Personal life

Stewart married Emily Caroline Martin (1913-2009) in 1935. Emily was a granddaughter of Norman Magnus MacLeod of MacLeod, the 26th Chief of Clan MacLeod. They had three children - Michael Martin (1937-2010), Roderick James (1939-2026) and Elizabeth Margaret (b.1944).
