= John Wilton (diplomat) =

British diplomat (1921–2011)

Sir Arthur John Wilton KCMG KCVO MC (21 October 1921 – 12 June 2011), known as John Wilton, was a British diplomat who was Ambassador to Kuwait (1970–1974) and to Saudi Arabia (1976–1979).

Wilton was born on 21 October 1921, the son of Walter and Annetta Wilton. He was educated at Wanstead High School, winning an Open Scholarship to St John's College, Oxford in 1940. In 1942 he was commissioned into the Royal Ulster Rifles, and served with the Irish Brigade in North Africa, Italy and Austria between 1943 and 1946. He was awarded the Military Cross and was Mentioned in Despatches. He was awarded a War-time MA (first class Honours) from the University of Oxford on the basis of the time spent at Oxford and on war service.

He entered HM Diplomatic Service in 1947, with postings in Lebanon, Egypt, Gulf Shaikdoms (including the post of the first Political Officer resident in Doha, Qatar, August 1949 – July 1950), SFR Yugoslavia and Romania. He was Director of the Middle East Centre for Arab Studies in Lebanon from 1960 to 1965, Deputy High Commissioner in Aden 1966–1967, Ambassador to Kuwait 1970–1974, Assistant Under-Secretary of State, Foreign and Commonwealth Office 1974–1976, and Ambassador to Saudi Arabia 1976–1979. He was also Director of the London House for Overseas Graduates 1979–1986 and Chairman of the Arab-British Centre 1981–1986.

After he retired to Devon, he was President of the Plymouth branch of the English Speaking Union (from 1991) and a Trustee of the Arab-British Chamber Charitable Foundation (from 1989), churchwarden of St. Maurice's Church, Plympton, Devon and chairman of the charity Call South West. He was awarded an Honorary LLD in 1986 by New England College, New Hampshire, USA.

Wilton died suddenly on 12 June 2011, aged 89. He was survived by his wife of 60 years, Maureen, children, grandchildren and great-grandchildren.Lady Wilton died in 2019.
