= Hugh Stonehewer Bird =

British diplomat (1891–1973)

Sir Hugh Stonehewer Bird KCMG OBE

British Ambassador to Iraq
- In office 1945–1948
- Preceded by: Sir Kinahan Cornwallis
- Succeeded by: Sir Henry Mack

British Minister to Saudi Arabia
- In office 1940–1943
- Preceded by: Sir Reader Bullard
- Succeeded by: Stanley Jordan

Personal details
- Born: 13 November 1891
- Died: 7 December 1973 (aged 82)
- Children: 2
- Education: Pembroke College, Cambridge
- Occupation: Diplomat

Sir Francis Hugh William Stonehewer Bird (13 November 1891 – 7 December 1973) was a British diplomat who served as minister to Saudi Arabia from 1940 to 1943, and ambassador to Iraq from 1945 to 1948.

== Early life and education ==
Stonehewer Bird was born on 13 November 1891, the son of Frank Stonehewer Bird. He was educated at Berkhamsted School and Pembroke College, Cambridge.

== Career ==
Stonehewer Bird was appointed a student interpreter in the Levant Consular Service in 1913, and a consular assistant in 1915. For the next ten years, he served at Jassy, Bucharest, Belgrade, Mogador, and Rabat where he was promoted to vice-consul. In 1927, he was appointed consul and agent at Jedda before he was transferred to Casablanca in 1930, and then to Rabat in 1936.

In 1937, he was promoted to consul-general at Addis Ababa, and in 1939, served as envoy extraordinary and minister plenipotentiary, and head of the Legation at Jedda, a post he held until 1943. After serving two years as consul-general in the French zone of Morocco at Rabat, he was appointed ambassador extraordinary and plenipotentiary to Iraq in 1945, a post he held until his retirement in 1948.

== Personal life and death ==
Stonehewer Bird married Francoise Laczynski in 1918, and they had a son and a daughter.

Stonehewer Bird died on 7 December 1973.

== Honours ==
Stonehewer Bird was appointed Companion of the Order of St Michael and St George (CMG) in the 1939 New Year Honours, and promoted to Knight Commander (KCMG) in 1945. He was appointed Officer of the Order of the British Empire (OBE) in the 1929 Birthday Honours.

== See also ==
- Iraq–United Kingdom relations
- Saudi Arabia–United Kingdom relations

Diplomatic posts
Preceded by Sir Reader Bullard	British Minister to Saudi Arabia; 1940–1943	Succeeded by Stanley Jordan
Preceded by Sir Kinahan Cornwallis	British Ambassador to Iraq; 1945–1948	Succeeded by Sir Henry Mack
