= James Craig (diplomat) =

British diplomat

Sir (Albert) James Macqueen Craig GCMG (13 July 1924 – 26 September 2017) was a British diplomat who was ambassador to Syria and Saudi Arabia and political agent to the Trucial States, also an academic and writer.

== Career ==
Craig was born in Liverpool and educated at Liverpool Institute High School for Boys. He then won an exhibition to The Queen's College, Oxford. He gained first class in Classics Honour Moderations after his first year, then served in the army 1943–44 but left due to illness and returned to Oxford where he gained a first class degree in Arabic and Persian. He lectured in Arabic at Durham University 1948–55, taking a year off to study at Cairo University 1950–51. In 1955 he took leave from Durham to be senior lecturer at the Middle East Centre for Arab Studies.

He joined the Foreign Office and was Political Agent in the Trucial States 1961–64. His successor as Political Agent, Glencairn Balfour Paul, called him "the best Arabist in the [diplomatic] service."

He was posted to Beirut 1964–67 and to Jeddah 1967–70, then took a year's sabbatical fellowship at St Antony's College, Oxford, 1970–71. His next post was head of the Near East and North Africa Department at the Foreign and Commonwealth Office 1971–75. During this time, in November 1974 a British Airways aircraft was hijacked and flown to Tunis, where Craig was sent to deal with the crisis. The hijackers murdered a German banker but the remaining passengers and crew were released.

Craig was deputy High Commissioner at Kuala Lumpur 1975–76, ambassador to Syria 1976–79 and ambassador to Saudi Arabia 1979–84 during which he had to rebuild relations with the Saudis who were offended by the 1980 ATV drama-documentary Death of a Princess.

He then retired from the Diplomatic Service and was visiting professor in Arabic and lecturer at Pembroke College, Oxford, 1985–1991. Among other activities he was Director General of the Middle East Association 1985–93 and President 1993–2011. He also served as a director of Middle East International.

Craig was appointed CMG in the 1975 New Year Honours, knighted KCMG in the 1981 New Year Honours and promoted to GCMG in the 1984 New Year Honours. After his retirement he was made an Officer of the Order of St John.

== Publications ==
- Shemlan: A History of the Middle East Centre for Arab Studies, Macmillan, 1998
- The Arabists of Shemlan - MECAS Memoirs, (Craig served on the editorial board), Stacey 2006
- CRAIG, Sir (Albert) James (Macqueen), Who's Who 2017, A & C Black, 2017 (online edition, Oxford University Press, 2016)
- Craig, Sir Albert James Macqueen, b 1924, Knight, diplomat, British Diplomatic Oral History Programme, Churchill College, Cambridge
- "Sir James Craig: Diplomat whose grasp of Arab issues eased tensions with Saudi Arabia [obituary]". The Independent. London. 19 October 2017.

Diplomatic posts
| Preceded by David Roberts | Ambassador Extraordinary and Plenipotentiary to the Syrian Arab Republic; 1976–1979 | Succeeded by Patrick Wright |
| Preceded by Sir John Wilton | Ambassador Extraordinary and Plenipotentiary at Jedda; 1979–1984 | Succeeded by Sir Patrick Wright |
