= John Moberly (diplomat) =

British diplomat (1925–2004)

Sir John Moberly KBE CMG

British Ambassador to Iraq
- In office 1982–1985
- Preceded by: Sir Stephen Egerton
- Succeeded by: Sir Terence Clark

British Ambassador to Jordan
- In office 1975–1979
- Preceded by: Glencairn Balfour Paul
- Succeeded by: Sir Alan Urwick

Personal details
- Born: John Campbell Moberly; 27 May 1925
- Died: 14 September 2004 (aged 79)
- Spouse: Patience Proby (m. 1959)
- Children: 3
- Parent: Walter Hamilton Moberly
- Education: Magdalen College, Oxford
- Occupation: Diplomat

Military service
- Allegiance: United Kingdom
- Branch/service: Royal Navy
- Years of service: 1943-1947
- Rank: Midshipman
- Battles/wars: World War II; Adriatic campaign; D-Day landing

Sir John Campbell Moberly (27 May 1925 – 14 September 2004) was a British diplomat who served as ambassador to Jordan from 1975 to 1979 and ambassador to Iraq from 1982 to 1985.

== Early life and family ==
Moberly was born on 27 May 1925 in Exmouth, Devon. His father was the academic Sir Walter Hamilton Moberly, who was principal of University College of the South West of England when he was born. Moberly was educated at Winchester College, where his great grandfather George Moberly had been principal.

== Career ==
Moberly served in the Royal Navy during World War II and was mentioned in despatches for his bravery during the Adriatic campaign. After the war, he enrolled at Magdalen College, Oxford to read history.

In 1950, he entered the Foreign Service, initially working at the Information Policy Department. At the encouragement of George Middleton, he received training in Arabic, spending just under two months at the School of Oriental and African Studies followed by about a year at the Middle East Centre for Arab Studies (MECAS) in Shemlan, Lebanon. By December 1952, he was able to speak Arabic at Lower Standard, before being posted to Bahrain as third secretary. In 1953, he was promoted to second secretary and transferred to Kuwait where he served as political officer. By the time he was posted to Kuwait, Moberly had achieved Higher Standard proficiency in Arabic. In 1957, he was promoted to first secretary, and two years later, transferred to Qatar as political agent.

From 1962 to 1966, he was at Athens, acquiring Lower Standard of Greek by 1963 and Intermediate Standard by 1964. From 1969 to 1973, he was posted at Washington as counsellor. After spending two years as director of MECAS, in 1975, he was appointed ambassador to Jordan, a post he held until 1979. Moberly's experience and knowledge of the Middle East earned the respect of the King and his advisers who welcomed his views. His relationship with King Hussein and his family remained long after Moberly left Jordan. According to The Times, "During his years in Amman Moberly completed the process of making himself one of the Foreign Office's principal experts on the Arab world."

After serving for three years at the Foreign and Commonwealth Office as assistant under-secretary of state responsible for Middle East relations, he served as ambassador to Iraq from 1982 to 1985. With the continuing war between Iraq and Iran, and Saddam Hussein's distrust of the West, his three years in the post were challenging. According to The Times, with a desire for a secular state to counter-balance fundamentalist Iran in the region, "Moberly walked this tightrope with the same skill he had shown in Amman and in London."

After retiring from the Diplomatic Service in 1985, Moberly became chairman of a company advising businesses on the region. He worked with the Royal Institute of International Affairs advising on the Arab world, and with his frequent appearances in the media, particularly during the Gulf War, he became the "public face of diplomatic wisdom on Middle Eastern affairs."

== Honours ==
Moberly was appointed Companion of the Order of St Michael and St George (CMG) in the 1976 New Year Honours. He was appointed Knight Commander of the Order of the British Empire (KBE) in the 1984 Birthday Honours.

== Personal life and death ==
In 1959, Moberly married Patience Proby (known as Lady Patience Moberly following her husband's knighthood) and they had two sons and a daughter. A medical doctor, Lady Moberly cared for her husband when he got ill during his post in Qatar in the 1950s. Sir and Lady Moberly established the first intensive care unit in Gaza and were founding members of the charity Medical Aid for Palestinians. Sir Moberly himself later served as the chair of Medical Aid for Palestinians.

Moberly died on 14 September 2004, aged 79.

== See also ==
- Jordan–United Kingdom relations
- Iraq–United Kingdom relations

Diplomatic posts
Preceded by Glencairn Balfour Paul	British Ambassador to Jordan; 1975–1979	Succeeded by Sir Alan Urwick
Preceded by Sir Stephen Egerton	British Ambassador to Iraq; 1982–1985	Succeeded by Sir Terence Clark
