= List of ambassadors of the United Kingdom to Iraq =

The ambassador from the United Kingdom to Iraq is the United Kingdom's foremost diplomatic representative in Iraq, and head of the UK's diplomatic mission in Iraq. The official title is His Britannic Majesty's Ambassador to the Republic of Iraq.

== List of heads of mission ==
=== High commissioners for Iraq (and commander-in-chief, from 1922) ===
- 1920–1923: Sir Percy Cox
- 1923–1929: Sir Henry Dobbs
- 1929: Sir Gilbert Clayton
- 1929–1932: Sir Francis Humphrys

=== Ambassadors extraordinary and plenipotentiary to His Majesty the King of Iraq ===
- 1932–1935: Sir Francis Humphrys
- 1935–1937: Sir Archibald Clark Kerr
- 1937–1939: Sir Maurice Peterson
- 1939–1941: Sir Basil Newton
- 1941–1945: Sir Kinahan Cornwallis
- 1945–1948: Sir Hugh Stonehewer Bird
- 1948–1951: Sir Henry Mack
- 1951–1954: Sir John Troutbeck
- 1954–1958: Sir Michael Wright

=== Ambassadors extraordinary and plenipotentiary to the Republic of Iraq ===
- 1958–1961: Sir Humphrey Trevelyan
- 1961–1965: Sir Roger Allen
- 1965–1967: Sir Richard Beaumont
- 1967–1968: Break in diplomatic relations due to the Six-Day War
- 1968–1969: Trefor Evans
- 1969–1971: Glencairn Balfour Paul
- 1971–1974: Break in diplomatic relations following Iran's seizure of the Tunb islands
- 1974–1977: John Graham
- 1977–1980: Alexander Stirling
- 1980–1982: Stephen Egerton
- 1982–1985: Sir John Moberly
- 1985–1989: Terence Clark
- 1990–1991: Sir Harold Walker
- 1991–2004: Break in diplomatic relations following the First Gulf War
- 2004–2005: Edward Chaplin
- 2005–2006: William Patey
- 2006–2007: Dominic Asquith
- 2007–2009: Christopher Prentice
- 2009–2011: John Jenkins
- 2011–2012: Michael Aron
- 2012–2014: Simon Paul Collis
- 2014–2017: Frank Baker
- 2017–2019: Jonathan Wilks
- 2019–2021: Stephen Hickey
- 2021–2023: Mark Bryson-Richardson
- 2023–2025: Stephen Hitchen
- 2025–present: Irfan Siddiq

== See also ==
- British-Iraqi relations
