= Patrick Wright, Baron Wright of Richmond =

British diplomat (1931–2020)

The Right Honourable The Lord Wright of Richmond GCMG
- Wright in 2016

Permanent Under-Secretary of State of the Foreign and Commonwealth Office
- In office 1986–1991
- Preceded by: Sir Antony Acland
- Succeeded by: Sir David Gillmore

British Ambassador to Saudi Arabia
- In office 1984–1986
- Prime Minister: Margaret Thatcher
- Preceded by: Sir James Craig
- Succeeded by: Sir Stephen Egerton

British Ambassador to Syria
- In office 1979–1981
- Prime Minister: Margaret Thatcher
- Preceded by: James Craig
- Succeeded by: Roger Tomkys

British Ambassador to Luxembourg
- In office 1977–1979
- Prime Minister: James Callaghan
- Preceded by: Sir Antony Acland
- Succeeded by: Jeremy Thomas

Member of the House of Lords
- Lord Temporal
- Life peerage 10 February 1994 – 17 December 2019

Personal details
- Born: Patrick Richard Henry Wright; 28 June 1931
- Died: 6 March 2020 (aged 88)
- Spouse: Virginia Anne Gaffney (m. 1958)
- Children: 3, including Angus Wright
- Education: Merton College, Oxford
- Occupation: Diplomat

Patrick Richard Henry Wright, Baron Wright of Richmond, GCMG (28 June 1931 – 6 March 2020) was a British diplomat who served as Head of HM Diplomatic Service.

He sat in the House of Lords as a crossbencher from 10 February 1994 until his retirement on 17 December 2019.

== Background ==
Patrick Wright was the son of Herbert and Rachel Wright. He was educated at Marlborough College. Having served in the Royal Artillery in 1950 and 1951, he went up to Merton College, Oxford where he graduated with a Bachelor of Arts in Literae humaniores in 1955.

== Diplomatic career ==
He joined HM Diplomatic Service in 1955 and went to study Arabic at MECAS in Lebanon from 1956 to 1957. He was posted as Second Secretary in the British Embassy in Beirut from 1958 to 1960. Between 1960 and 1965, he was private secretary to the ambassador and first secretary in the Washington, D.C., embassy, between 1965 and 1967 private secretary to the FCO's Permanent Under-Secretary of State (PUS) and first secretary and Head of Chancery in the British embassy in Cairo between 1967 and 1970. Wright was deputy political resident in Bahrain in 1971 and 1972, head of Middle East Department in the Foreign and Commonwealth Office from 1972 to 1974, and private secretary (overseas affairs) to two prime ministers, Harold Wilson and James Callaghan from 1974 to 1977. In 1977, Patrick Wright was appointed ambassador to Luxembourg and to Syria in 1979, where he remained until 1981. He was Deputy Under-Secretary of State at the FCO from 1982 to 1984.

Sir Patrick Wright was appointed ambassador to Saudi Arabia from 1984 to 1986. For the next five years he combined the roles of PUS at the FCO and head of HM Diplomatic Service until he retired in 1991.

== Post-retirement ==
Lord Wright was a director of Barclays from 1991 until 1996, of BP until 2001, of De La Rue until 2000, of Unilever until 1999 and of BAA until 1998.

Between 1993 and 2002, he was a member of the Security Commission. He was a member of the Council of Chatham House (Royal Institute of International Affairs) from 1992 to 1999, and chairman from 1995 to 1999. He was Member of Council of Atlantic College between 1993 and 2000, and of the Royal College of Music from 1991 to 2001. Wright was Governor of the Ditchley Foundation from 1986 until his death in 2020. From 1991 to 2001, he was a Governor of Wellington College, from 1991 to 1995 Registrar of the Most Venerable Order of St John of Jerusalem, and Director of Overseas Relations from 1995 to 1997. He was a founding trustee of the UK-based family support charity Home-Start International, of which he was chairman from 2004 to 2007.

== Honours ==
In the 1978 New Year Honours, Wright was appointed to the Order of St Michael and St George as a Companion (CMG), promoted to be a Knight Commander (KCMG) in the 1984 Birthday Honours, and again to be a Knight Grand Cross (GCMG) in the 1989 Birthday Honours. One year later he was appointed to the Order of St John as a Knight (KStJ). In the 1994 New Year Honours, it was announced that he would become a life peer and he was raised to the peerage as Baron Wright of Richmond, of Richmond upon Thames in the London Borough of Richmond upon Thames on 10 February 1994.

== Family ==
Patrick Wright married Virginia Anne Gaffney in 1958. They had two sons, Marcus (born 1959) and Angus (born 1964), and one daughter, Olivia, Lady McDonald (born 1963), wife of Simon McDonald, Baron McDonald of Salford (later also Permanent Under-Secretary at the Foreign and Commonwealth Office and head of the Diplomatic Service).

== Arms ==
Coat of arms of Patrick Wright, Baron Wright of Richmond
Crest Beneath a palm tree a pelican in its piety with its young all Proper. Escutcheon Per fess Gules and Or, on a pale counterchanged between in chief two oak leaves Or each charged with a quaver Azure and in base as many oak leaves Gules each charged with a quaver Gold a doric column Proper and overall a chevron per pale Azure and Gules. Supporters Dexter, a bichon frisé rampant and in trim aspect Proper; sinister, a stag guardant Gold. Motto Constantia Et Fidelitate

Diplomatic posts
Preceded by Sir Antony Acland	British Ambassador to Luxembourg; 1977–1979	Succeeded by Sir Jeremy Thomas
Preceded by Sir James Craig	British Ambassador to Syria; 1979–1981	Succeeded by Sir Roger Tomkys
Preceded by Sir James Craig	British Ambassador to Saudi Arabia; 1984–1986	Succeeded by Sir Stephen Egerton
Government offices
Preceded by Sir Antony Acland	Permanent Under-Secretary for Foreign Affairs; 1986–1991	Succeeded by The Lord Gillmore
