= Trefor Evans (diplomat) =

British diplomat (1913–1974)

Trefor Evans CMG OBE

British Ambassador to Iraq
- In office 1968–1969
- Preceded by: no ambassador
- Succeeded by: Glencairn Balfour Paul

British Ambassador to Syria
- In office 1964–1967
- Preceded by: Thomas Bromley
- Succeeded by: no ambassador

British Ambassador to Algeria
- In office 1962–1964
- Preceded by: post established
- Succeeded by: Thomas Bromley

Personal details
- Born: 4 March 1913
- Died: 16 April 1974 (aged 61)
- Children: 2
- Education: Balliol College, Oxford
- Occupation: Diplomat

Trefor Ellis Evans (4 March 1913 – 16 April 1974) was a British diplomat who served as ambassador to Algeria from 1962 to 1964, ambassador to Syria from 1964 to 1967, and ambassador to Iraq from 1968 to 1969.

== Early life and education ==
Evans was born on 4 March 1913, the son of John and Mary Evans. He was educated at Cowbridge Grammar School, Wales, Balliol College, Oxford, where he took a BA in 1934, and at the University of Hamburg where he was awarded a DPhil in 1937.

== Career ==
Evans entered the Consular Service in 1937, and was posted to Beirut as a probationer vice-consul. In 1939, he was transferred to Alexandria as vice-consul. From 1941 to 1942, he served as third secretary and then second secretary at Cairo. From 1945 to 1946, he was vice-consul at Aleppo and Damascus before he was transferred to Beirut where he was promoted to first secretary. After acting as chargé d’affaires at Beirut in 1947 and 1948, he was employed at the Foreign Office as head of the Middle East secretariat.

In 1952, he was posted back to Cairo as counsellor where he spent five years before he returned to the Foreign Office. In 1957, he was appointed counsellor at Berne, July 29, 1957. He was then posted to Algiers in 1959 as consul-general, and promoted to chargé d’affaires, and subsequently ambassador extraordinary and plenipotentiary in 1962. He then served as ambassador extraordinary and plenipotentiary at Damascus from 1964 to 1967, and ambassador extraordinary and plenipotentiary to the Republic of Iraq from 1968 to 1969.

After retiring from the service in 1969, he became a professor of international politics at Aberystwyth University.

== Personal life and death ==
Evans married Nest Margaret Williams and they had two daughters.

Evans died on 16 April 1974, aged 61.

== Honours ==
Evans was appointed Companion of the Order of St Michael and St George (CMG) in the 1956 Birthday Honours. He was appointed (OBE) in the 1948 New Year Honours.

== See also ==
- Iraq–United Kingdom relations
- Syria–United Kingdom relations
- Algeria–United Kingdom relations

Diplomatic posts
Preceded by post established	British Ambassador to Algeria; 1962–1964	Succeeded by Thomas Bromley
Preceded by Thomas Bromley	British Ambassador to Syria; 1964–1967	Succeeded by no ambassador
Preceded by no ambassador	British Ambassador to Iraq; 1968–1969	Succeeded by Glencairn Balfour Paul
