= Embassy of the United Kingdom, Kyiv =

Coordinates: 50.4571°N 30.5199°E

British Embassy Kyiv
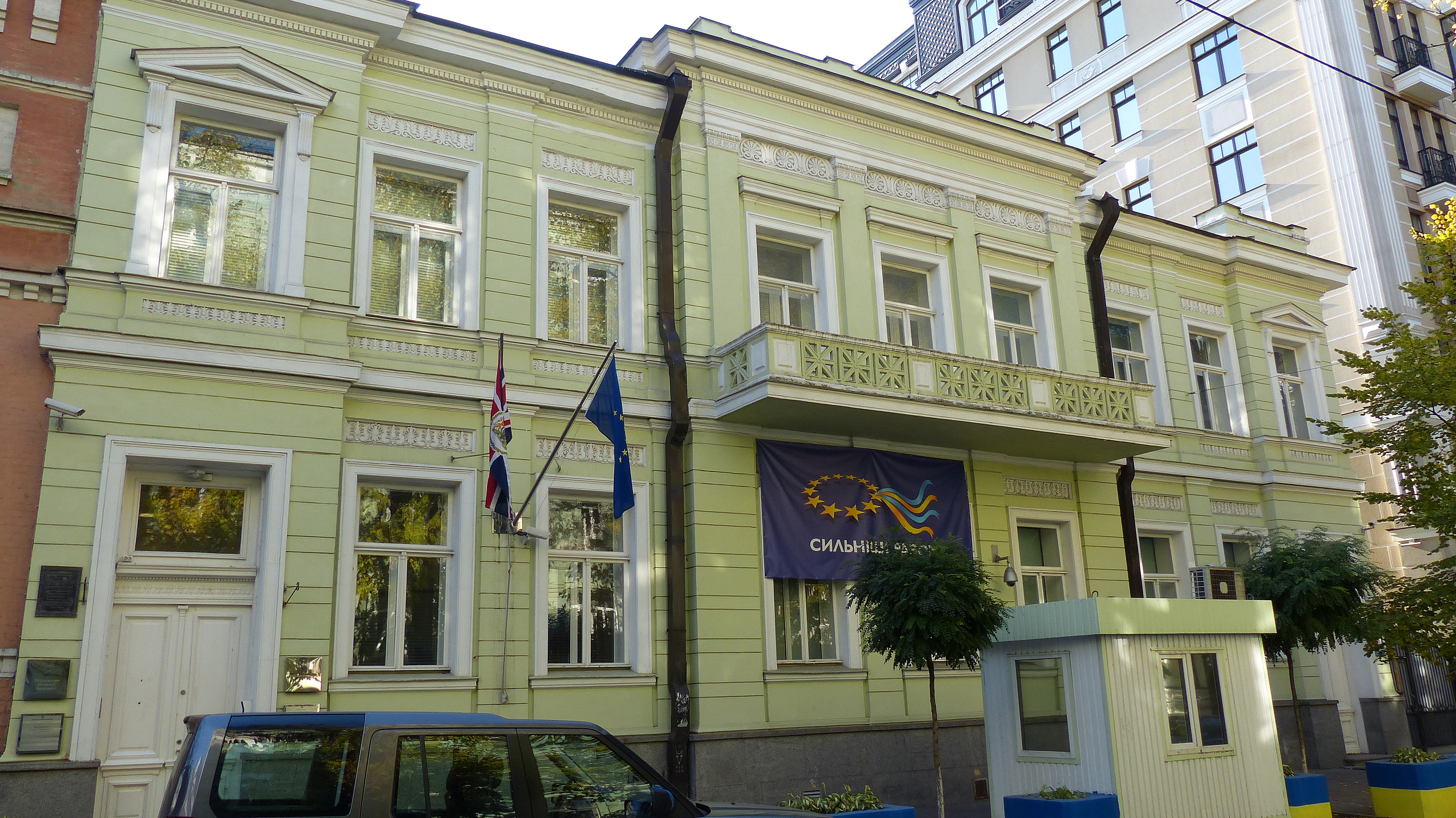
- British Embassy building in Kyiv, 2014
- Location: Kyiv, Ukraine
- Address: 9 Desyatynna Street, Kyiv 01901, Ukraine
- Ambassador: Neil Crompton
- Website: Official website

The British Embassy Kyiv (Ukrainian: Посольство Великої Британії в Києві) is the British sovereign's diplomatic mission to Ukraine, representing the United Kingdom and the United Kingdom's interests. The embassy is located on Desyatynna street in the Pecherskyi District of the city, directly opposite the building of the Ministry of Foreign Affairs of Ukraine. The British Ambassador to Ukraine is Neil Crompton who was appointed in October 2025.

The UK also operates a British Embassy Office in Lviv, representing the UK in western Ukraine.

== History ==
The United Kingdom recognised the independence of Ukraine on 31 December 1991. Diplomatic relations were established on 10 January 1992. The United Kingdom opened a consulate-general in Kyiv in November 1991, then upgraded it to an embassy in January 1992.

The United Kingdom withdrew around half of all staff in the days following 24 January 2022 amid fears of a Russian invasion, according to a statement from the Foreign Office. This followed a similar slow withdrawal of Russian embassy staff and relatives of U.S. embassy staff leaving Ukraine. On 20 April 2022, it was announced that the British Embassy in Kyiv would be reopening the following week. During 2022, 350 Royal Marines from 45 Commando supported embassy diplomats in Ukraine.

On 12 February 2026, British Ambassador Neil Crompton formally opened the British Embassy Office in Lviv, which had been operating on a temporary basis since February 2022. The ceremony was attended by the mayor of Lviv, Andriy Sadovyy, and the Governor of Lviv Oblast, Maksym Kozytskyy. It represents the UK in the Lviv, Ivano-Frankivsk, Ternopil, Volyn, Rivne, Zakarpattia, Khmelnytskyi and Chernivtsi oblasts.

== See also ==
- Ukraine–United Kingdom relations
- List of Ambassadors from the United Kingdom to Ukraine
- List of diplomatic missions in Ukraine
- Embassy of Ukraine, London
