= Terence Clark =

British retired diplomat and writer

Sir Terence Joseph Clark KBE CMG CVO (born 19 June 1934) is a British retired diplomat and writer.

== Career ==
Clark was educated at Parmiter's School. He did National Service nominally in the Royal Air Force, actually learning Russian at the Joint Services School for Linguists and at the School of Slavonic Studies at Cambridge University and graduated as a Russian interpreter and pilot officer in the Royal Air Force Volunteer Reserve. He then joined the Foreign Service (now the Diplomatic Service), volunteered to learn Arabic and was sent first to the School of Oriental and African Studies in London and then to the Middle East Centre for Arabic Studies in Lebanon. He then served at Bahrain, Amman, Casablanca, Dubai, Belgrade, Muscat and Bonn. He returned to Belgrade with the rank of counsellor 1979–82, with a break as chargé d'affaires at Tripoli February–March 1981 while the ambassador, Michael Edes, was on leave. Clark was deputy leader of the UK delegation to the Conference on Security and Co-operation in Europe (predecessor of the OSCE) 1982–83, head of the Information Department at the Foreign and Commonwealth Office 1983–85, ambassador to Iraq 1985–89 during the Iran–Iraq War, and back to Muscat as ambassador to Oman 1990–94 including the 1991 Gulf War.

Clark left the Diplomatic Service in 1994 and was a consultant to the international business development company MEC International 1995–2008 and chairman of the Anglo-Omani Society 1995–2004. He was director of the International Crisis Group's Bosnia Project in Sarajevo in 1996.

== Honours ==
Clark was appointed CVO in 1978, CMG in 1985, and knighted KBE in 1990. He was awarded the Commander's Cross of the German Order of Merit in 1978 while he was serving in Bonn.

== Publications ==
- The Saluqi: Coursing Hound of the East (chapters), ed. Gail Goodman, Midbar, 1995. ISBN 0963922408
- Oman in Time: A Nation's History (contribution), Ministry of Information, Oman, 2001
- Al-Mansur's book on hunting (introduction, translation and notes, with Muawiya Derhalli), Aris & Phillips, Warminster, 2001. ISBN 0856687448
- Dogs in Antiquity: Anubis to Cerberus; The Origins of the Domestic Dog (with Douglas Brewer and Adrian Phillips), Aris & Phillips, Warminster, 2001. ISBN 0856687049
- Underground to Overseas: The Story of Petroleum Development Oman, Stacey International, 2007. ISBN 190529946X
- British missions around the Gulf, 1575-2005: Iran, Iraq, Kuwait, Oman (with Hugh Arbuthnott and Richard Muir), Global Oriental, Folkestone, 2008. ISBN 1905246587

Diplomatic posts
Preceded by Sir John Moberly	Ambassador to Iraq; 1985–1989	Succeeded by Sir Harold Walker
Preceded by Robert Alston	Ambassador to Oman; 1990–1994	Succeeded by Richard Muir
