= Melinda Simmons =

British diplomat (born 1966)

Her Excellency Dame Melinda Simmons DCMG
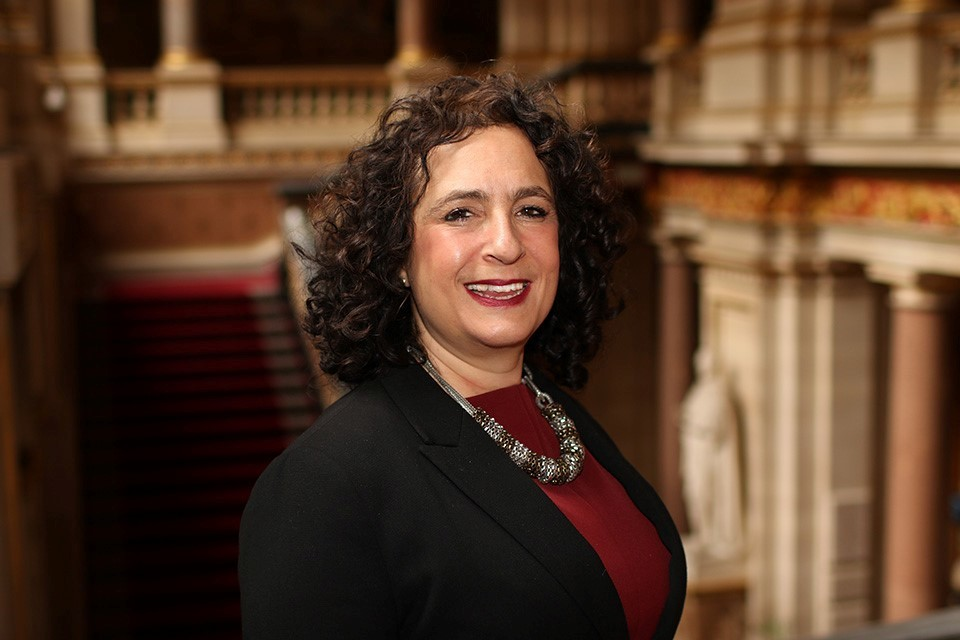

British Ambassador to Poland
- Incumbent
- Assumed office August 2025
- Monarch: Charles III
- Prime Minister: Keir Starmer; Andy Burnham
- Preceded by: Anna Clunes

British Ambassador to Ukraine
- In office 2019–2023
- Monarchs: Elizabeth II; Charles III
- Prime Minister: Boris Johnson; Liz Truss; Rishi Sunak
- Preceded by: Judith Gough
- Succeeded by: Martin Harris

Personal details
- Born: Melinda Veronica Simmons; 1966 (age 59–60) London, United Kingdom
- Spouse: Stephen Bevan
- Education: University of Exeter (BA); University of North London (MA)

Dame Melinda Veronica Simmons DCMG (born 1966) is a British diplomat who has served as the British Ambassador to Poland since August 2025, and previously served as the British Ambassador to Ukraine from 2019 to 2023.

== Early life and education ==
Simmons was born to Jewish parents in the East End of London. She was educated at the City of London School for Girls, before reading Modern Languages (French and German) at the University of Exeter, where she graduated as BA (Hons) in 1988. She then pursued further studies in European Politics at the University of North London, receiving a Master of Arts (MA) degree in 1995. Dame Melinda is a Fellow of the Chartered Institute of Personnel and Development.

== Career ==
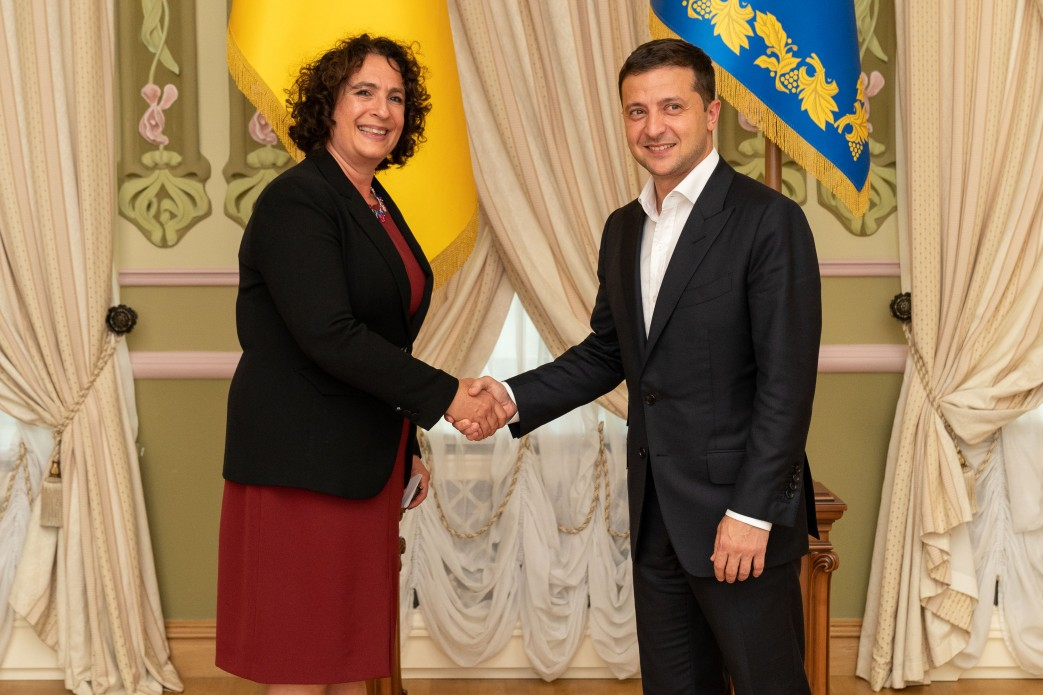
HE Melinda Simmons in 2019 with President Volodymyr Zelenskyy

From 1990 to 1992, Simmons was Head of International Department/Associate Director at the Register Group (International marketing and advertising research). She then became International Marketing Manager at Primesight International (outdoor advertising) from 1992 to 1994. From 1994 to 1998, she was Public Affairs Officer at International Alert (conflict resolution NGO) and from 1998 onwards she held roles at the Department for International Development (DfID).

From 1998 to 2003, Simmons held various positions including working with businesses to develop an ethical trademark; managing land restitution in the former Soviet Union; developing global policy on conflict prevention and resolution and setting up the Global Conflict Prevention Pool (GCPP), bringing together the Foreign and Commonwealth Office (FCO), Ministry of Defence (MoD) and DfID to collaborate on conflict prevention/resolution programmes in South Asia and the Middle East, becoming Head of the Africa Team, 2500 Unit (2003–05).

From 2005 to 2008, Simmons was head of DfID's Southern Africa office in Pretoria. She then became Deputy Director, Middle East and North Africa (2008–09); Deputy Director, Humanitarian Emergency Response Review (2010–11), then Head of the Europe Department (2011–13).

From 2013 to 2016, Simmons worked at the FCO as Deputy Director of the Conflict Department. She was the Head of the National Security Secretariat (Joint Programme Hub) from 2016 to 2017 and National Security Secretariat Director (Joint Funds Unit) from 2017 to 2018.

After undertaking full-time language training (in Ukrainian) with the FCO from 2018, in 2019, Simmons was appointed British Ambassador to Kyiv, Ukraine.

She departed Kyiv on 19 February 2022 and finally left Ukraine, under advice, on 7 March 2022 following the Russian invasion, returning to her office at the British Embassy in Kyiv at the end of April 2022.

She is expected to become Ambassador to Poland in August 2025.

== Honours ==
Simmons was appointed Dame Commander of the Order of St Michael and St George (DCMG) in the 2023 New Year Honours for services to British foreign policy.

== Personal life ==
Simmons is Jewish and is a member of Finchley Reform Synagogue in London.

Diplomatic posts
Preceded by Judith Gough	British Ambassador to Ukraine; 2019–2023	Succeeded by Martin Harris
