= List of ambassadors of the United Kingdom to Syria =

The ambassador of the United Kingdom to Syria was the United Kingdom's foremost diplomatic representative to Syria, and head of the UK's diplomatic mission in Damascus. The official title was His Britannic Majesty's Ambassador to the Syrian Arab Republic.

In February 2012 all diplomatic staff were withdrawn from the British Embassy in Damascus and its services were suspended. There is now no ambassador. The UK appoints a special envoy to Syria; the present incumbent is the head of the Near East Department at the Foreign, Commonwealth and Development Office in London.

== Heads of mission ==
=== Envoys extraordinary and ministers plenipotentiary ===
==== Syrian and Lebanese Republics ====
- 1942–1944: Edward Spears
- 1944–1946: Terence Shone

==== Damascus ====
- 1947: Patrick Scrivener
- 1947–1950: Philip Broadmead
- 1950–1952: William Montagu-Pollock

=== Ambassadors extraordinary and plenipotentiary to the Syrian Arab Republic ===
- 1952–1953: William Montagu-Pollock
- 1953–1957: John Gardener
- 1958–1961: Syria joined with Egypt in the United Arab Republic
- 1962–1964: Thomas Bromley
- 1964–1967: Trefor Evans
- 1967–1973: Diplomatic relations broken off due to the Six-Day War
- 1973–1976: David Roberts
- 1976–1979: James Craig
- 1979–1981: Patrick Wright
- 1982–1984: Ivor Lucas
- 1984–1986: Roger Tomkys
- 1986–1991: Diplomatic relations broken off following the Hindawi affair
- 1991–1994: Andrew Green
- 1994–1996: Adrian Sindall
- 1996–2000: Basil Eastwood
- 2000–2003: Henry Hogger
- 2003–2006: Peter Ford
- 2006–2007: John Jenkins
- 2007–2012: Simon Collis
- 2012: Ambassador withdrawn – embassy closed

=== UK special envoys to Syria ===
- 2014: Jonathan Wilks (2012–2013: UK Special Envoy to the Syrian opposition)
- 2014–2017: Gareth Bayley
- 2017–2020: Martin Longden
- 2020–2023: Jonathan Hargreaves
- 2023–2026: Ann Snow
- 2026 (acting): Barrie Peach
