= Stephen Hitchen =

British diplomat (born 1969)

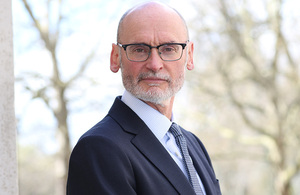
- Hitchen in 2025

British Ambassador to Saudi Arabia
- Incumbent
- Assumed office August 2025
- Monarch: Charles III
- Prime Minister: Keir Starmer; Andy Burnham
- Preceded by: Neil Crompton

British Ambassador to Iraq
- In office July 2023 – February 2025
- Monarch: Charles III
- Prime Minister: Rishi Sunak; Keir Starmer
- Preceded by: Mark Bryson-Richardson
- Succeeded by: Irfan Siddiq

Personal details
- Born: Stephen Charles Hitchen; 1969 (age 56–57) Harrogate, North Yorkshire
- Education: Durham University

Stephen Charles Hitchen (born 1969) is a British diplomat who served as Ambassador to Iraq between July 2023 and February 2025. A specialist in the politics of the Middle East, he was appointed Ambassador to the Kingdom of Saudi Arabia in August 2025.

== Early life ==
Hitchen was born in Harrogate, North Yorkshire. His father was a lawyer and Methodist lay preacher. He was educated at Ashville College, Harrogate and Durham University where he studied history. Shortly after graduating, he walked the route of the medieval pilgrim trail from York to Jerusalem with his future wife. He completed an MA at Leeds University and a PhD on the fall of the Ottoman Empire.

== Career ==
Hitchen joined the Ministry of Defence in 1996 and completed full time language training in Arabic from 1999-2001. He transferred to the Foreign and Commonwealth Office in 2004.

In the Foreign Office, he has worked exclusively on the Middle East and Iran, including postings in Egypt, Kuwait and Jordan. He has held various jobs in London including Director, Middle East and Director, Counter-Terrorism.

In 2023, he was appointed British Ambassador to Iraq. His tenure in Iraq was notable for its high media profile. He appeared on The Bashir Show and developed his own television programme in which he interviewed prominent Iraqis, including former President Barham Salih, singer Ilham Al-Madfa’i, and Father Yusuf, a monk at the monastery of Mar Mata’i in Nineveh.

His appearance on the Bestoon Show caused controversy when he criticised the role of Iranian-backed militias in Iraqi society.

His appointment as British Ambassador to Saudi Arabia was announced in May 2025.
