= Martin Harris (diplomat) =

British diplomat (born 1969)

His Excellency Martin Harris CMG OBE
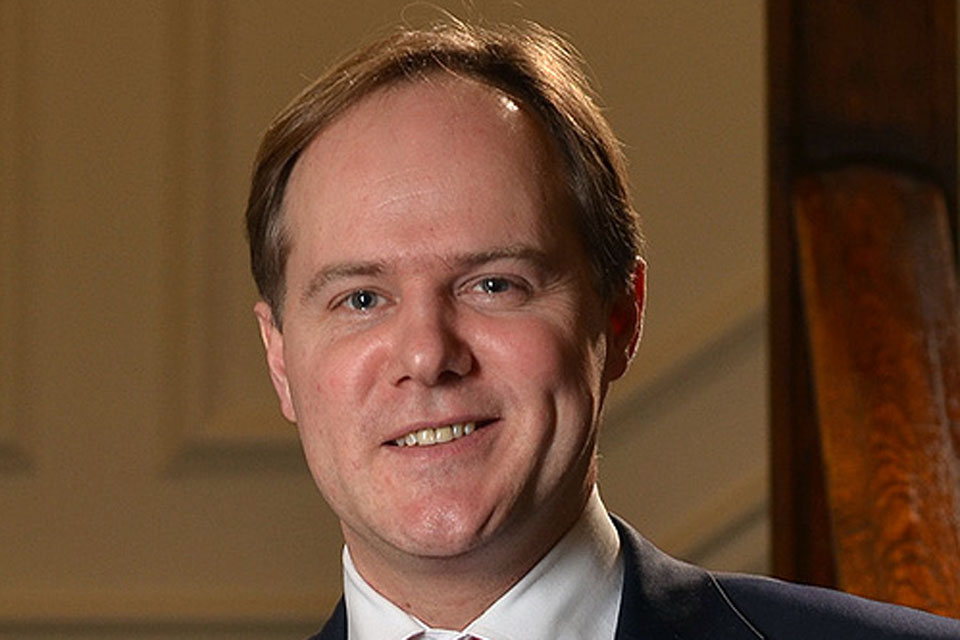
- Official portrait, 2013

British Ambassador to Ukraine
- In office September 2023 – September 2025
- Monarch: Charles III
- Prime Minister: Rishi Sunak; Keir Starmer
- Preceded by: Melinda Simmons
- Succeeded by: Neil Crompton

British Ambassador to Romania
- In office 2010 – April 2014
- Monarch: Elizabeth II
- Prime Minister: David Cameron
- Preceded by: Robin Barnett
- Succeeded by: Paul Brummell

Personal details
- Born: Martin Fergus Harris; 17 May 1969 (age 57) Edinburgh, Scotland
- Spouse: Linda MacLachlan
- Children: 3
- Education: University of Cambridge
- Occupation: Diplomat

Martin Fergus Harris (born 17 May 1969) is a British diplomat who served as British Ambassador to Ukraine from 2023 to 2025 and as British Ambassador to Romania from 2010 to 2014.

== Early life ==
Martin Fergus Harris was born on 17 May 1969 in Edinburgh. He attended George Watson's College and Glenalmond College before going on to read history at Corpus Christi College, Cambridge. He was President of the Cambridge Union in 1990.

== Career ==
Harris joined the Foreign and Commonwealth Office (FCO) in 1991 and was the Second Secretary at the UK delegation to the OCSE in Vienna from 1992 to 1996. He led the FCO's Pakistan and Afghanistan section from 1997 to 1998 and ran the UK's programme of technical assistance in the Russian Federation at the British Embassy in Moscow from 1999 to 2003. He then moved to the British Embassy in Kyiv where he was Consul General and Deputy Head of Mission from 2003 to 2008.

Harris returned to London in 2008 where he was an adviser in the Cabinet Office on Afghanistan, Pakistan, Eastern Europe and Central Asia. From 2010 to 2014, he was the British ambassador to Romania and from 2014 to 2017 was the Minister and Deputy Head of Mission at the British Embassy in Moscow. He was the Director for Eastern Europe and Central Asia in the Foreign, Commonwealth and Development office from 2017 to 2022.

=== Ambassador to Ukraine (2023–2025) ===
Harris was named the new British Ambassador to Ukraine in July 2023 to succeed Melinda Simmons, and assumed office in September of the same year. He presented his credentials to Ukrainian Deputy Foreign Minister, Yevhen Perebyinis, on 11 September and to President Volodymyr Zelenskyy on 27 September. He left the post in September 2025, and was succeeded by Neil Crompton.

== Personal life ==
Harris met Linda MacLachlan when they were students at Corpus Christi College, and the couple married in the College Chapel. They have 3 daughters.

== Honours ==
Harris was appointed an Officer of the Order of the British Empire in 2010 and a Companion of the Order of St Michael and St George in 2023.
