= List of ambassadors of the United Kingdom to Ukraine =

The ambassador of the United Kingdom to Ukraine is the United Kingdom's foremost diplomatic representative in Ukraine, and in charge of the UK's diplomatic mission in Kyiv. The position's official title is His Majesty's Ambassador Extraordinary and Plenipotentiary to Ukraine.

== Ambassadors ==
- 1992–1995: Simon Hemans
- 1995–1999: Roy Reeve
- 1999–2002: Roland Smith
- 2002–2006: Robert Brinkley
- 2006–2008: Tim Barrow
- 2008: Martin Harris chargé d'affaires March–June
- 2008–2012: Leigh Turner
- 2012–2015: Simon Smith
- 2015–2019: Judith Gough
- 2019–2023: Dame Melinda Simmons
- 2023–2025: Martin Harris
- 2025: Charlotte Surun chargée d'affaires September–October 2025
- 2025–: Neil Crompton

== See also ==
- Embassy of the United Kingdom, Kyiv
- Embassy of Ukraine, London
- Ukraine–United Kingdom relations
- Ukraine–European Union relations
