= Thomas Eardley Bromley =

British diplomat (1911–1987)

Bromley in 1961.

Sir Thomas Bromley KCMG (14 December 1911 – 18 June 1987) was a British diplomat who was ambassador to Somalia, Syria, Algeria, and Ethiopia.

== Career ==
Son of Thomas Edward Bromley of the Indian Civil Service, Thomas Eardley Bromley was educated at Rugby School and Magdalen College, Oxford. He joined the British Consular Service in 1935 and was a vice-consul in Japan from 1938 until 1941 when Japan entered World War II. He then returned to London and after the war served at Washington, D.C., and Baghdad.

Bromley was the first Ambassador to the then Somali Republic after independence on 1 July 1960, then ambassador to Syria 1962–64 following its secession from the United Arab Republic, then ambassador to Algeria from 1964 until Algeria, along with other members of the OAU, broke off diplomatic relations in December 1965 over Rhodesia. Bromley's last ambassadorship was to Ethiopia 1966–69. In 1968, while addressing a gathering of 2,000 university students in Addis Ababa, he was stoned by demonstrators against the Smith regime in Rhodesia.

== Family ==
In 1944 Bromley married Diana Pratt, daughter of Sir John Pratt, also a diplomat, and niece of the actor Boris Karloff whose real name was William Henry Pratt. In 1958 she killed their two sons and attempted suicide; she was declared insane. He divorced her and later married Alison Toulmin (née Coutts), the first wife of Professor Stephen Toulmin.

In its obituary of Bromley, The Times said "Tom Bromley was a cultured, sensitive and intensely private man. ... Inevitably, with his wife committed to custody, he withdrew from society but was able to go on to occupy more ambassadorial posts than are given to most diplomats."

== Honours ==
Thomas Bromley was appointed CMG in the 1955 Birthday Honours and knighted KCMG in the 1964 Birthday Honours.

Diplomatic posts
New title	Ambassador Extraordinary and Plenipotentiary at Mogadishu; 1960–1961	Succeeded by Lancelot Pyman
Preceded by no ambassador	Ambassador Extraordinary and Plenipotentiary at Damascus; 1962–1964	Succeeded by Trefor Ellis Evans
Preceded by Trefor Ellis Evans	Ambassador Extraordinary and Plenipotentiary at Algiers; 1964–1965	Succeeded by no ambassador
Preceded by Sir John Russell	Ambassador Extraordinary and Plenipotentiary at Addis Ababa; 1966–1969	Succeeded by Alan Campbell
