= Stephen Hickey (diplomat) =

British diplomat

Stephen Hickey CMG

British Ambassador to Italy
- Incumbent
- Assumed office June 2026
- Monarch: Charles III
- Prime Minister: Keir Starmer; Andy Burnham
- Preceded by: Edward Llewellyn

British Ambassador to Iraq
- In office September 2019 – July 2021
- Monarch: Elizabeth II
- Prime Minister: Boris Johnson
- Preceded by: Jonathan Wilks
- Succeeded by: Mark Bryson-Richardson

Stephen Benedict Hickey CMG is a British diplomat who served as the ambassador to Iraq for 2019–2021.

In June 2026, he took up the role as ambassador to Italy.

== Biography ==
Hickey is from Bromley, his father is Edward (Eddie) Hickey of England, UK. He attended St Olave's Grammar School for secondary education.

He holds a BA in Philosophy, Politics and Economics from the University of Oxford. He has worked as a diplomat in several Arab League countries including Egypt, Libya and Syria, in which he served as a deputy ambassador in the latter from 2010 to 2011, as he was evacuated during the Syrian civil war.

In September 2019, he became the British ambassador to Iraq. In July 2020, he received death threats from the Iraqi Harakat Hezbollah al-Nujaba, due to his comments that Iraq was being held back by "armed groups operating outside state control".

He was Director Middle East and North Africa at the Foreign, Commonwealth & Development Office (FCDO) until March 2026.

Hickey was appointed Companion of the Order of St Michael and St George (CMG) in the 2026 New Year Honours for services to British Foreign Policy.

== Personal life ==
He is married to Laura Madelaine Hickey and has three sons. He can speak fluent Arabic.
