= Stephen Egerton (diplomat) =

British diplomat

Sir Stephen Loftus Egerton KCMG (21 July 1932 – 7 September 2006) was a British diplomat from the Egerton family.

== Early life ==
Egerton was born in Indore, India, on 21 July 1932. He was a son of William le Belward Egerton, grandson of William Egerton, and great-grandson of Philip Henry Egerton.

Egerton returned to England aged 11 to be educated at Eton College, where he won the Newcastle Scholarship. After National Service in the King's Royal Rifle Corps, he read classics at Trinity College, Cambridge.

== Career ==
He joined the Foreign Service in 1956, and had a succession of posts including Kuwait, Iraq, New York and Tripoli. He served as British ambassador to Iraq from 1980 to 1982, and to Saudi Arabia from 1986 to 1989. His final position was as ambassador to Rome, from 1989 to 1992, during which time he also became Britain's first (non-resident) ambassador to Albania.

He was appointed CMG in 1978 and KCMG in 1988.

== Personal life ==
He married Caroline Cary-Elwes in 1958, with whom he had a son and a daughter.

Diplomatic posts
| Preceded by Alexander Stirling | British Ambassador to Iraq; 1980–1982 | Succeeded by Sir John Moberly |
| Preceded by Sir Patrick Wright | British Ambassador to Saudi Arabia; 1986–1989 | Succeeded by Sir Alan Munro |
| Preceded by Sir Derek Thomas | British Ambassador to Italy; 1989–1992 | Succeeded by Sir Patrick Fairweather |
