= Neil Crompton (diplomat) =

British diplomat

His Excellency Sir Neil Crompton KCMG CBE
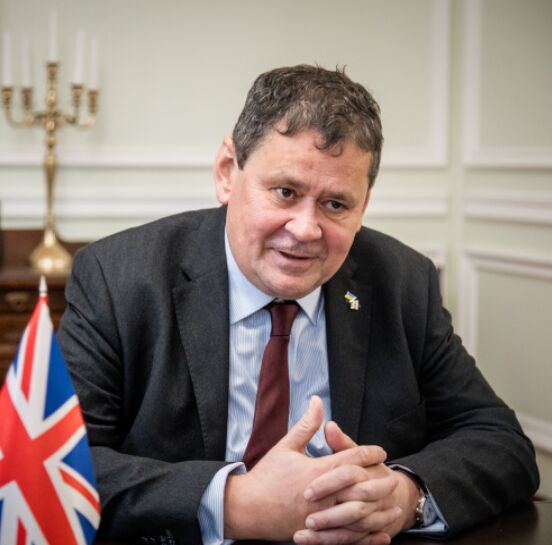
- Crompton in 2025

British Ambassador to Ukraine
- Incumbent
- Assumed office October 2025
- Monarch: Charles III
- Prime Minister: Keir Starmer
- Preceded by: Martin Harris

British Ambassador to Saudi Arabia
- In office February 2020 – June 2025
- Monarchs: Elizabeth II; Charles III
- Prime Minister: Boris Johnson; Liz Truss; Rishi Sunak; Keir Starmer
- Preceded by: Simon Collis
- Succeeded by: Stephen Hitchen

Personal details
- Born: September 1964 (age 62)
- Spouse: Rosa Zaragoza
- Children: 2
- Education: University College, University of Durham
- Occupation: Diplomat

Sir Richard Anthony Neil Crompton KCMG CBE (born September 1964) is a British diplomat who has served as the British Ambassador to Ukraine since October 2025. He previously served as the British Ambassador to Saudi Arabia from 2020 to 2025, and has held several positions in the Foreign, Commonwealth and Development Office including Director for the Middle East and North Africa between 2015 and 2019.

== Early life ==
Born in September 1964, Crompton graduated from the University of Durham (University College) with a Bachelor of Science and a Master of Arts degree. Crompton served in the British Army from 1990 until 1995. He joined the Foreign and Commonwealth Office in 1995 as a Senior Research Officer in the Middle East and North Africa Group.

== Diplomatic career ==
After joining the Foreign Office in 1995, Crompton spent much of his early career focused on Middle Eastern affairs. He was Head of the Iran Section from 1997 to 1998 and studied Persian full-time between 1998 and 1999. From 1999 to 2003, he served as Deputy Head of Mission at the British Embassy in Tehran, Iran.

Following his return to London, Crompton became Head of the Iraq Policy Unit from 2003 to 2005 and later served as the FCO's Iran Coordinator between 2005 and 2007. In 2007, he was posted to the British Embassy in Washington D.C. as a Counsellor responsible for foreign and security policy. During this assignment, he acted as the United Kingdom's representative to the United States Joint Intelligence Committee, taking part in policy coordination and high-level diplomatic engagement between the two countries. He remained in Washington until 2011.

Crompton returned to the FCO in 2011 to become Director for South Asia and Afghanistan, a position he held until 2014. In 2014, he moved to a new role as Director of the Eastern Europe and Central Asia Directorate, serving in that post until 2015. The following year, he was appointed Director for the Middle East and North Africa Directorate, where he oversaw the UK's diplomatic engagement across the region from 2015 to 2019. In 2019, prior to taking up his next overseas assignment, Crompton undertook full-time Arabic language training.

=== British Ambassador to Saudi Arabia (2020-2025) ===
Crompton was appointed British Ambassador to Saudi Arabia in October 2019, and took up the post in February 2020.

His tenure involved supporting negotiations on a UK–Gulf Cooperation Council Free Trade Agreement. His ambassadorship also coincided with the signing of UK–Saudi security and defence cooperation agreements, including updated frameworks on defence collaboration in 2023, as well as the visits of three British prime ministers to Saudi Arabia: Boris Johnson, Rishi Sunak and Keir Starmer. He completed his assignment in 2025 and was succeeded by Stephen Hitchen.

=== British Ambassador to Ukraine (2025-present) ===
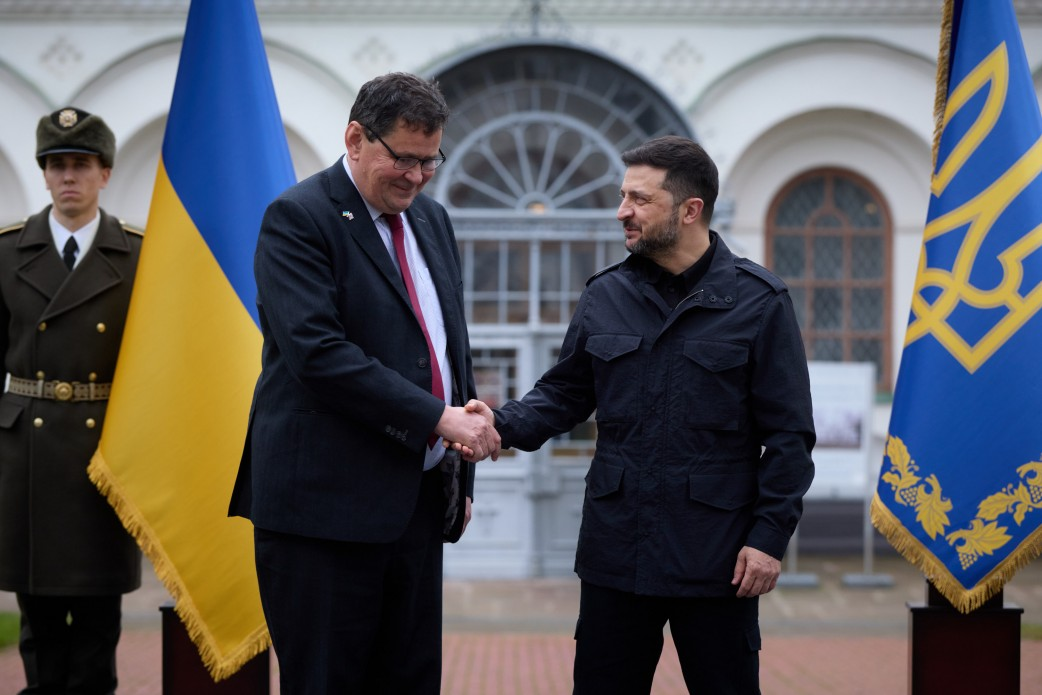
Crompton meeting Zelenskyy during the credentials presentation ceremony at St Sophia Cathedral, Kyiv, 5 November 2025

In October 2025, Crompton was appointed British Ambassador to Ukraine, succeeding Martin Harris. On 27 October 2025, he presented copies of his credentials to the Ukrainian Deputy Foreign Minister, Oleksandr Mishchenko. On 5 November 2025, he presented his credentials to President Volodymyr Zelenskyy in a ceremony held at the Saint Sophia Cathedral in Kyiv. In his remarks at the credential-presentation, Crompton reaffirmed the UK's commitment to supporting Ukraine's sovereignty and highlighted the UK–Ukraine “100 Year Partnership”.

== Personal life ==
Crompton is married and has two children.

== Honours ==
For his service in the capacity of chargé d'affaires in Tehran, Crompton was appointed a Commander of the Order of the British Empire (CBE) in the 2003 New Year Honours. In the 2026 King's Birthday Honours, Crompton was given the order of Knight Commander of the Order of St Michael and St George (KCMG) for "services to British foreign policy".
