= Mark Bryson-Richardson =

British diplomat

His Excellency Mark Bryson-Richardson MBE

British Ambassador to Iraq
- In office July 2021 – 2023
- Monarchs: Elizabeth II; Charles III
- Preceded by: Stephen Hickey
- Succeeded by: Stephen Hitchen

British Ambassador to Egypt
- Incumbent
- Assumed office 2025

Mark Edward Bryson-Richardson is a British diplomat.

== Career ==
Bryson-Richardson served in London as the Foreign Commonwealth and Development Office's Director covering the UK's development and humanitarian programmes across the Middle East, North Africa and Eastern Europe. He served as director of the Stabilisation Unit for the British government.

In July 2021, he was appointed ambassador to Iraq. In 2023, he was in office when Sophie, Duchess of Edinburgh visited Iraq, becoming the first British royal to do so. In office he had particular focus on climate change and water scarcity. He left the role as ambassador in July 2023.

In December 2023, became the Foreign Secretary’s Representative for Humanitarian Affairs in the Occupied Palestinian Territories, with a particular focus on the UK's humanitarian effort in Gaza amid the Israel-Gaza conflict. In 2024, the delivery of aid was given importance.

In 2025, he was appointed ambassador to Egypt.
