= Glencairn Balfour Paul =

British Arabist and diplomat

(Hugh) Glencairn Balfour Paul CMG (23 September 1917 – 2 July 2008) was a British Arabist and diplomat. He served as the British ambassador to Iraq, Jordan and Tunisia before becoming an academic at Exeter University.

== Biography ==
The son of John William Balfour Paul, he was born in Moniaive in Dumfriesshire, educated at Lime House school near Carlisle, then at Sedbergh School, before going to Magdalen College, Oxford, in 1936, to read classics. He was also the great-grandnephew of the British supercentenarian Margaret Ann Neve, related to her on his mother's side. He served with the Argyll and Sutherland Highlanders during World War II before being sent east to Egypt and then on to Sudan to the Sudan Defence Force. After the war he served the Sudan Political Service as a District Commissioner in the Blue Nile and Darfur provinces. Before leaving Sudan in 1954, he set out on a camel trek to explore the foothills of eastern Ennedi in nearby Chad. After some days alone he met up with his local guide, Ordugu, who had worked with Wilfred Thesiger on his expedition to the Tibesti Mountains decades earlier.

On returning to Britain he joined the Diplomatic Service. Following a first posting in Santiago he became First Secretary in Beirut and later, in 1964, Political Agent to the Trucial States based in Dubai, followed by a brief stint in Bahrain as Deputy to William Luce, and two months as acting Political Resident between Luce's departure and the arrival of Luce's intended successor, Stuart Crawford. He was appointed Ambassador to Iraq in 1969 (from where he was expelled in December 1971 for Britain's having failed to stop the Iranian seizure of the Tunb and Abu Musa Islands immediately prior to the foundation of the United Arab Emirates on 2 December 1971), Ambassador to Jordan in July 1972 and then Ambassador to Tunisia 1975–77.

== Kim Philby ==
Balfour Paul was a close friend of Kim Philby's during his tenure in Beirut, and he and his wife Marnie frequently socialised with Kim and Eleanor Philby. On 23 January 1963, the Philbys were due at the Balfour Paul's for dinner, when Eleanor arrived alone, explaining that Kim would be following. In fact, Philby had been picked up by a Soviet ship waiting in Beirut harbour, having been confronted by British intelligence agent Nicholas Elliott and accused of being the 'third man', the double agent who had protected double agents Maclean and Burgess and thereby facilitated their escape. Offered immunity from prosecution by Elliott in return for giving up the details of his espionage to SIS, Philby had been allowed to go home for the night and, in lieu of attending dinner at the Balfour Pauls, had fled.

The defection of Philby, given their close friendship, was to cause Balfour Paul - as a prominent diplomat - considerable discomfort, not least when Philby published a list of 'British spies in the Middle East' in Pravda with Balfour Paul's name at the top. Balfour Paul considered this a joke on Philby's part, and 'a singularly bad one'. Balfour Paul himself noted that Philby had likely been apprised of British suspicions of his role as a double agent by 'Fourth Man' Anthony Blunt, who had travelled to Beirut in December 1962 ostensibly in search of a rare frog orchid.

== Ouster of Shakhbut ==
During his short period as acting Political Resident in the Gulf, Balfour Paul was to be responsible for managing the removal of Sheikh Shakhbut bin Sultan Al Nahyan as Ruler of Abu Dhabi in favour of his brother, Sheikh Zayed bin Sultan Al Nahyan. Shakhbut's removal was long considered desirable by Balfour Paul's predecessor as Political Agent to the Trucial States, William Luce, who had even discussed the possibility with Shakhbut himself on a number of occasions.

The Al Nahyan family having finally petitioned for Shakhbut's removal, Balfour Paul flew to Abu Dhabi from Bahrain to meet Shakhbut for an ostensibly routine call, but had arranged for two companies of the Trucial Oman Scouts to be on 'manouevres' nearby. Shakhbut, enraged, appeared ready to resist the suggestion with force, calling up his guards, but the Scouts moved in with overwhelming superiority in numbers. Shakhbut was appraised of the fact that the senior members of the Al Nahyan family were gathered in a local police station awaiting his decision, and that his ouster was also supported by Britain. Shakhbut was removed to a temporary exile in a hotel in southwest Iran before returning to Abu Dhabi, now firmly under Zayed's rule.

== Retirement ==
Having retired from the diplomatic service aged 60, Balfour Paul became Director-General of the Middle East Association in London before joining Exeter University as a Research Fellow in the Centre for Arab Gulf Studies. On the day before his death in July 2008, Balfour Paul was present at the opening of an exhibition at the Center of his photographs of the Trucial States taken in the 1950s and 1960s. Whilst at Exeter he produced the volume The End of Empire in the Middle East (1991), and the Middle East section of The Oxford History of the British Empire. He also wrote his memoir, Bagpipes in Babylon (2006) and a collection of poetry, A Kind of Kindness (2000).

== Personal life ==
He married his first wife Margaret (Marnie) in 1950, who became ill and died following his posting to Iraq, suffering from spongiform encephalitis diagnosed in 1970 and which took her in March 1971 - having previously overcome a severe spinal injury from being thrown from a horse, and then polio. He married his second wife Jenny Scott, an authority on the production of the dye indigo, in 1974 during his tenure in Jordan. He was survived by three daughters and a son by Margaret and a son and daughter with Jenny.

== Honours ==
- Companion of the Order of St Michael and St George (CMG) – 1968

Diplomatic posts
Preceded by Trefor Evans	British Ambassador to Iraq; 1969–1972	Succeeded by John Graham
Preceded by John Phillips	British Ambassador to Jordan; 1972–1975	Succeeded by John Moberly
Preceded by John Marnham	British Ambassador to Tunisia; 1975–1977	Succeeded by John Lambert
