= List of ambassadors of the United Kingdom to Saudi Arabia =

The ambassador of the United Kingdom to Saudi Arabia is the United Kingdom's foremost diplomatic representative in Saudi Arabia, and in charge of the UK's diplomatic mission in Saudi Arabia. The official title is His Britannic Majesty's Ambassador to the Kingdom of Saudi Arabia.

== List of heads of mission ==
=== Envoys extraordinary and ministers plenipotentiary ===
- 1930–1936: Sir Andrew Ryan
- 1936–1939: Sir Reader Bullard
- 1940–1943: Hugh Stonehewer Bird
- 1943–1945: Stanley Jordan
- 1945–1947: Sir Laurence Grafftey-Smith

=== Ambassadors extraordinary and plenipotentiary ===
- 1947–1951: Alan Trott
- 1951–1955: Clinton Pelham
- 1955: Harold Beeley
- 1955–1956: Roderick Parkes
- 1956–1963: Diplomatic relations severed due to Suez Crisis
- 1963–1964: Sir Colin Crowe
- 1964–1968: Morgan Man
- 1968: Horace Phillips (rejected by Saudi government)
- 1968–1972: Sir Willie Morris
- 1972–1976: Sir Alan Rothnie
- 1976–1979: Sir John Wilton
- 1979–1984: Sir James Craig
- 1984–1986: Sir Patrick Wright
- 1986–1989: Sir Stephen Egerton
- 1989–1993: Sir Alan Munro
- 1993–1996: Sir David Gore-Booth
- 1996–2000: Sir Andrew Green
- 2000–2003: Sir Derek Plumbly
- 2003–2006: Sir Sherard Cowper-Coles
- 2006–2010: Sir William Patey
- 2010–2012: Sir Tom Phillips
- 2012–2015: Sir John Jenkins
- 2015–2020: Simon Collis
- 2020–2025: Neil Crompton
- 2025–present: Stephen Hitchen
