= Iraq–United Kingdom relations =

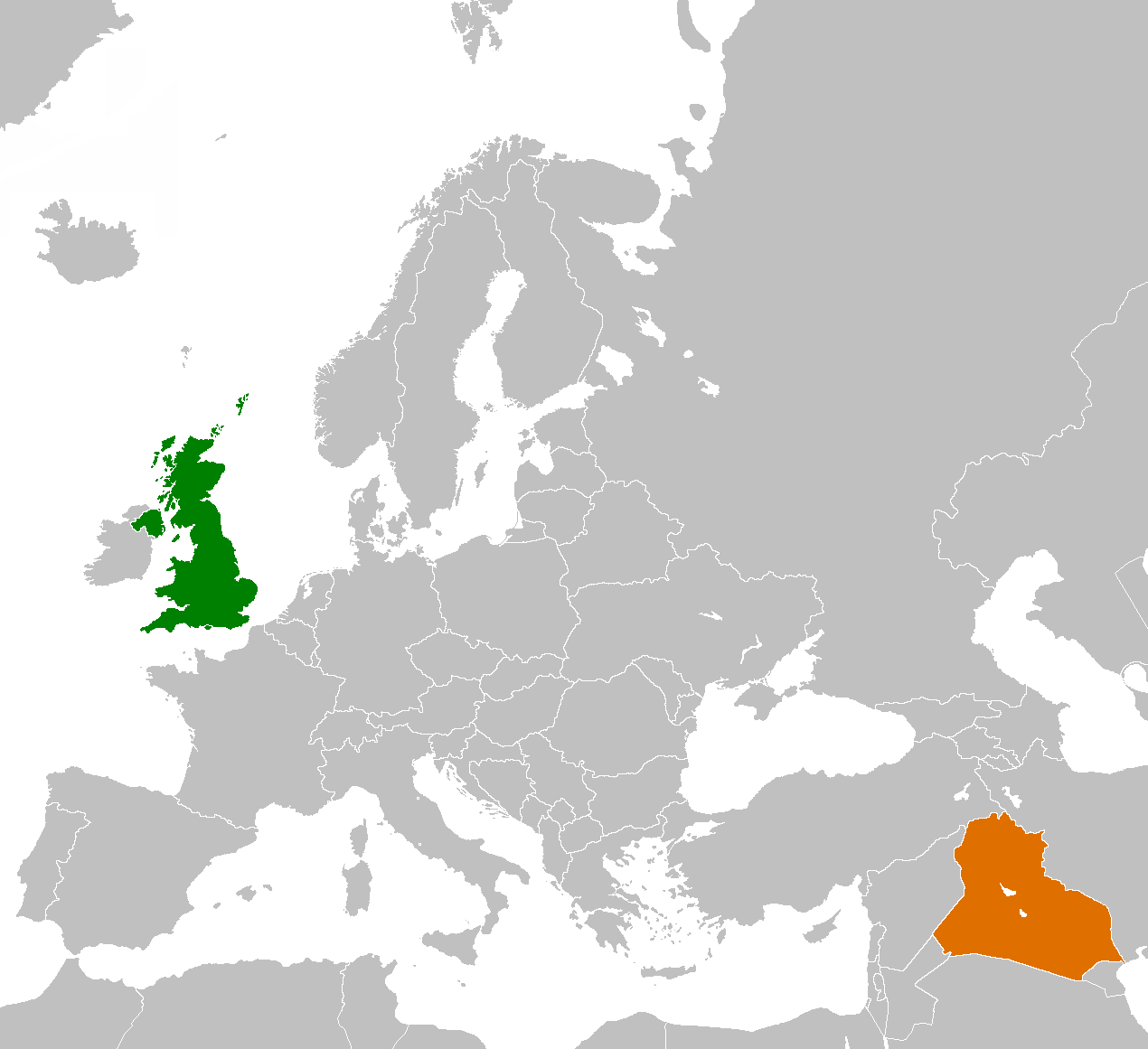

- United Kingdom: Iraq

Diplomatic mission
- Embassy of the United Kingdom, Baghdad: Embassy of Iraq, London

Iraq–United Kingdom relations are foreign relations between Iraq and the United Kingdom.

The current ambassador to Iraq is Stephen Hitchen.

== 1914–2003 ==
The history of British–Iraqi relations date back to the creation of Iraq in 1920, when it was controlled by Great Britain; by establishing separate provinces from Mosul to Basra. In the 19th century Europeans (mostly the British) began to take an interest in exploring, surveying, spying and trading in Mesopotamia, as well as in navigating its rivers. By 1914 there was growing anxiety about the security of the Persian oilfields on the other side of the Persian Gulf, these were the fields that supplied the Royal Navy.

=== World War I ===
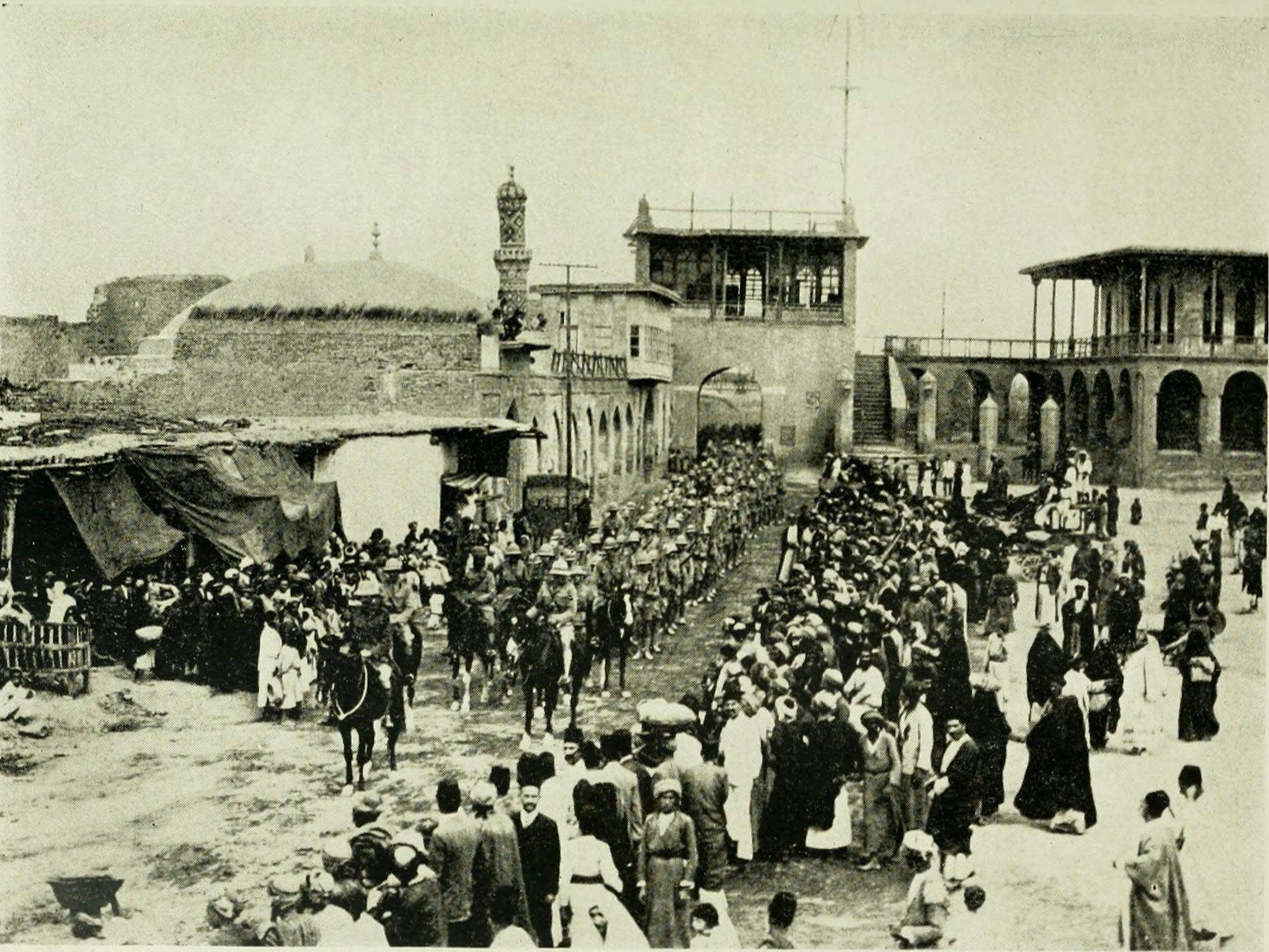
British troops entering Baghdad.

The Ottoman Empire entered World War I on the side of Germany and immediately became an enemy of Britain and France. Four major Allied operations attacked the Ottoman holdings. The Gallipoli Campaign to control the Straits failed in 1915-1916. The first Mesopotamian campaign invading Iraq from India also failed. The second one captured Baghdad in 1917. The Sinai and Palestine campaign from Egypt was a British success. By 1918 the Ottoman Empire was a military failure. It signed an armistice in late October that amounted to surrender.

=== The foundation of Iraq ===
By the end of World War I, British forces were in control of the three provinces (Baghdad, Basra and Mosul), and the British administration in Baghdad had to decide on their future. The Ottoman Empire had collapsed, leaving the former Arab provinces in limbo, and the colonial powers of Britain and France aimed to absorb them into their empires; however, the Arab and other inhabitants felt strongly that they had been promised independence. Iraq then became a British mandate, carved out of the three former Ottoman provinces. There was immediate resentment amongst Iraq's inhabitants at what they saw as a charade, and in 1920 a strong revolt spread through the country, the situation was so bad that the British commander, General Sir Aylmer Haldane, at one time called for supplies of poisonous gas. The mandate united the three disparate provinces under the imported Hashimite King Faisal. Apart from its natural geographical differences, Iraq was a complex mix of ethnic and religious groups. In particular the rebellious Kurds in the north had little wish to be ruled from Baghdad, while in the south the tribesmen and Shia's had a similar abhorrence of central control. In implementing their mandate, the British had sown the seeds of future unrest. There were other contentious issues. The Iraqis deeply resented the borders imposed on them that cut them off from Kuwait, a mini-state that they believed to be a part of their country. These borders also meant that Iraq had only limited access to the waters of the Persian Gulf. The British imposed a monarchy and a form of democracy but, even after the grant of formal independence in 1930, most Iraqis believed that the British really ruled the country.

Iraq remained a satellite of Britain for the next three decades, under the terms of a treaty signed in 1930, which included the retention of British military bases and an agreement to train the Iraqi army. Ironically, this army became a breeding ground of resentment against the British presence, particularly amongst new nationalist officers. After the death of King Faisal in 1933 the country was virtually ruled by a group of colonels who saw themselves as the future liberators of an oppressed Iraq.

=== World War II ===
The Anglo–Iraqi War (2–31 May 1941) was a British-led Allied military campaign to regain control of Iraq and its major oil fields. Rashid Ali had seized power in 1941 with assistance from Germany. The campaign resulted in the downfall of Ali's government, the re-occupation of Iraq by the British, and the return to power of the Regent of Iraq, Prince 'Abd al-Ilah, a British ally. The British launched a large pro-democracy propaganda campaign in Iraq from 1941–5. It promoted the Brotherhood of Freedom to instil civic pride in disaffected Iraqi youth. The rhetoric demanded internal political reform and warned against growing communist influence. Heavy use was made of the Churchill-Roosevelt Atlantic Charter. However, leftist groups adapted the same rhetoric to demand British withdrawal. Pro-Nazi propaganda was suppressed. The heated combination of democracy propaganda, Iraqi reform movements, and growing demands for British withdrawal and political reform became as a catalyst for postwar political change.

=== 1950s–2003 ===
In 1955, the United Kingdom was part of the Baghdad Pact. HM King Faisal II of Iraq paid a state visit to the United Kingdom in July 1956.

The British had a plan to use 'modernisation' and economic growth to solve Iraq's endemic problems of social and political unrest. The idea was that increased wealth through oil production would ultimately trickle down to all elements and thereby stave off the danger of revolution. The oil was produced but the wealth never reached below the elite. Iraq's political-economic system put unscrupulous politicians and wealthy landowners at the apex of power. They remained in control using an all-permeating patronage system. As a consequence, very little of the vast wealth was dispersed to the people, and unrest continued to grow. In 1958, monarch and politicians were swept away in a vicious nationalist army revolt.

In 1961, after Kuwait had gained independence from Britain, the Iraqi leader, General Qasim, claimed it as an integral part of Iraq and concentrated his troops on the frontier, with the intention of taking it by force. Britain was ready and dispatched troops stationed in the Persian Gulf region to dissuade the Iraqis from armed conflict. In 1979, Saddam Hussein, seized power in Iraq in the name of the Arab nationalist Ba'ath Party, a secular organization devoted to achieving the unity of all Arabs. In September 1980 when Iraqi troops crossed into Iran, by the orders of Saddam; Britain was one of the nations that armed Iraq. Saddam was seen as "a Churchill scholar" and anglophile, even after the 2003 invasion. A decade later however, Anglo-Iraqi relations timbered over when the UK supported the coalition forcing Iraq out of Kuwait.

== 2003–present ==
=== Iraq War, 2003 ===
Britain once again found itself in Iraq after an invasion in 2003. British forces were mainly based in the southern city of Basra, but after handing over Basra to Iraqi forces in 2007, both Iraq and Britain stressed the need to develop economic relations between the two countries. This was confirmed by the British Foreign Minister, David Miliband, during his current visit to Iraq on the occasion of his country's troops handing over the reins of security in Basrah to the Iraqi forces, and said:

"By spring 2008 our military presence in Basrah will be 2500 troops. We would like now to focus on new prospects of cooperation in the economic, political and military areas; our forces have been able to build close ties with their Iraqi counterparts under the leadership of lieutenant general Mouhan."

A statement issued by the Presidency of the Cabinet quoted Al-Maliki stressing his government's keenness to establish better relations with Britain and open horizons of joint cooperation in all fields, saying that the coming phase will witness the establishment of multiple projects for the reconstruction of Basrah and all other provinces, calling on the British government to contribute actively in these projects and help to support the development of the Iraqi economy. On 22 May 2011 all of the remaining British troops had left Iraq and were all redeployed to Kuwait after the Iraqi government rejected their request to stay in Iraq and to extend their mission.

=== Unlocking Iraq’s economic potential ===
Background

Following three decades of conflict and international sanctions, Iraq’s economy is set to become one of the fastest growing in the world over the next 10 years. Its GDP growth rate for 2013 is forecast for around 14% - largely fuelled by a rapidly developing hydrocarbons sector which already generates around $8bn a month in oil revenues. On the back of this sizeable wealth stream, Iraq’s import demand is projected to increase by 150% by 2020, with major opportunities in sectors including:

- power generation
- infrastructure
- healthcare
- education
- financial and professional services
- telecoms
- security
- ICT

British companies are especially well placed to capitalise on investment opportunities in Iraq, given the significant historical and cultural ties that exist between the UK and Iraq, as well as the UK’s solid reputation for quality and clean business practices.

UK exports to Iraq totaled £782m in 2011, and exports of goods increased 40% last year. But there are still significant challenges to doing business here. Corruption, bureaucracy, lack of transparency and decades of under-investment in key infrastructure all contribute to Iraq continuing to score poorly on global ease of doing business rankings. And while the UK and Iraqi Governments are working together to address a number of the major barriers to trade, Iraq remains a challenging market in which to do business, especially for inexperienced exporters.

Security also remains a major consideration for companies looking to operate in Iraq, and visitors are strongly recommended to consult the FCO travel advice for Iraq prior to travelling. For most parts of the country, business visitors should also consider the use of private security when planning a trip. The UKTI commercial team in Baghdad can supply contact details of the private security companies operating in Iraq.

The British government actions :

- Encouraging the Iraqi government and the Kurdistan Regional Government to pass and implement new legislation on hydrocarbons and revenue sharing.
- Contributing to Iraqi development of a strategic vision for the energy sector.
- Encouraging the Iraqi government to play a responsible role in OPEC and other international energy institutions.
- Working with the EU on a strategic partnership with Iraq, including encouraging gas exports to the EU.
- Supporting British companies to win high value contracts in Iraq.
- Improving UK visa operations in Iraq.
- Encouraging and supporting the Iraqi government to resolve the problems that prohibit business, and encourage inward investment.
- Supporting increased private sector growth in Iraq, leading to job creation.
- Building partnerships between UK and Iraqi colleges and universities to support improved learning and develop vocational, academic and professional skills.
- Improving provision of education and training in the state sector.
- Encouraging Iraq-funded scholarships to the UK.
- Seeking reduced restrictions on banks eligible to issue letters of credit.
- Encouraging a market open to foreign banks and support British banks’ efforts to enter and grow.
- Supporting development of retail banking to provide small loans to private businesses and the public.

UK Trade & Investment services

UK Trade & Investment (UKTI) helps UK-based companies succeed in the global economy. They also help overseas companies bring their high-quality investment to the UK’s dynamic economy.

UKTI offers expertise and contacts through its extensive network of specialists in the UK, and in British embassies and other diplomatic offices around the world. They provide companies with the tools they require to be competitive on the world stage.

In Iraq, UKTI has commercial staff at the British Embassy in Baghdad, covering trade in the centre and south of the country – including Basra, and in the British Consulate in Erbil, covering trade in the Kurdistan region.

UKTI Responsibilities

UKTI’s commercial teams in Iraq are helping UK companies to identify opportunities in the country, and supporting them in accessing the market. They are also working with the Iraqi Government to identify and overcome obstacles to doing business in Iraq, including through the UK/Iraq Joint Ministerial Trade Council.

The Iraq UK Gateway

The Iraq UK Gateway is a UK based business and was established to facilitate business-to-business transactions by providing the Iraqi companies with credible access to the British market place and Industry, sourcing products as well as approaching established businesses to promote the largely untapped potential for Iraq-British cooperation.

It offers British businesses a gateway to explore new business opportunities and to expand their market internationally. Iraq has all the success components and national will and determination to become one of the richest and most successful growing economies in the world. They work with both sides to overcome the challenges that exist and are well placed to encourage greater participation and engagement by British business in Iraq’s fast growing economy.

They are currently a dedicated small team of professionals actively working with other professional associates and together they can help Iraqi and British businesses to navigate the sometimes challenging route to successful trading in and with Iraq and the UK.

=== Strategic Partnership and Trade Agreement ===
In January 2025, Iraqi Prime Minister Mohammed Shia' Al Sudani met with his British counterpart Keir Starmer in London, where the UK and Iraq agreed to a £12.3 billion trade package focusing on sectors such as defense, infrastructure, and water, in addition to projects such as de-mining, reconstruction of Al-Qayyarah airbase and development of 5G networks. The partnership also covered cooperation on migration, organized crime, and border security. Both nations aimed to strengthen long-term strategic ties and address regional challenges together.

== Resident diplomatic missions ==
- Iraq has an embassy in London and a consulate-general in Manchester.
- the United Kingdom has an embassy in Baghdad and a consulate-general in Erbil.

== See also ==
- British Mandate of Iraq
- Anglo-Iraqi War
- Anglo-Iraqi Treaty
- Iraqi Britons, British people of Iraqi descent
- Foreign relations of Iraq
- Foreign relations of the United Kingdom
- List of Ambassadors from the United Kingdom to Iraq
- British support for Iraq during the Iran-Iraq war
- Iraq and the European Union
- British foreign policy in the Middle East
- Occupation of Iraq (2003–2011)
