= Henry Mack =

British diplomat (1894–1974)

Sir William Henry Bradshaw Mack GBE KCMG (21 August 1894 - 9 March 1974) was a British diplomat. He was Ambassador to Austria from 1945 to 1948, Ambassador to Iraq from 1948 to 1951, and Ambassador to Argentina from 1951 to 1955.
