= Middle East Centre for Arab Studies =

Arabic language college created by the British Army

The Middle East Centre for Arab Studies (MECAS) was an Arabic language college created by the British Army during World War II in Jerusalem, and relocated afterwards as a civilian institution to Lebanon near Beirut where it functioned between 1947 and 1978.

== History ==
The Middle East Centre for Arab Studies was established by the British Army during World War II in Jerusalem. Between 1944 and 1946 it functioned in the requisitioned Austrian Hospice, where it was headed by the English Arabist Bertram Thomas. Its purpose was to teach officers Arabic language and culture. After a short post-war intermezzo in the town of Zarqa in Transjordan, in 1947 it moved to its final location in Shemlan, in the Mount Lebanon Governorate of Lebanon.

In Lebanon the college was reopened by the Foreign and Commonwealth Office of the British Government. The college gained notoriety as a "spy school" after it was publicly denounced as such by Kamal Jumblatt speaking in the Lebanese Parliament. Official documents affirm MECAS as a civilian institution, though its value and connections to espionage are well documented. An initial note on its pre-1944 function was that the "Centre would be to train Army Officers for military and political intelligence". However, after the handover to Arabist civilians the director of the institution protested such usage, asking for the cancellation of spying orders from Middle East Land Forces involving six students in 1951. The connections to the British establishment remained strong however, with past alumni including the Head of MI6, several senior staff at the Foreign, Commonwealth and Development Office, and a director general of the British Council. The British/Soviet double agent George Blake, who was a student at the school, was taken from there to Heathrow, where he was formally arrested on espionage charges.

The Civil War made the situation increasingly difficult, and in 1976, MECAS was temporarily evacuated before closing altogether in 1978.

The property was sold in 1995 and the buildings repurposed for the Shemlan Social Institution, which accommodates "special needs beneficiaries with mental and learning disabilities".

== Cultural references ==
- The name of the village and the story of the college was used by British author Alexander McNabb for a 2013 book, the third of his Middle East cycle: Shemlan - A Deadly Tragedy, the story of a dying retired British diplomat who was taught at Shemlan, who returns to look for an old love.
