= Elizabeth Maria Bowen Thompson =

British missionary, educator and writer (1812/13–1869)

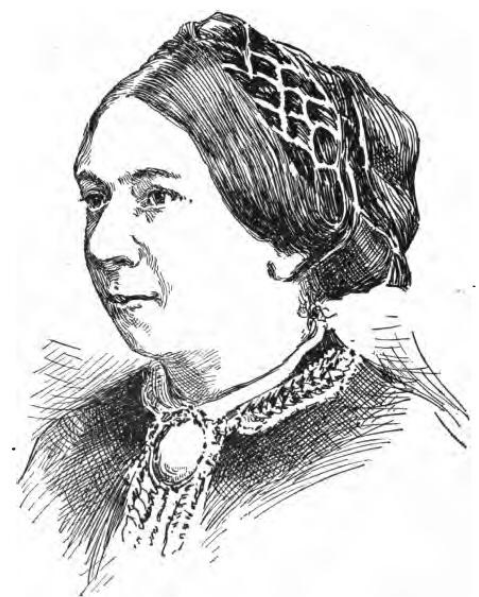
- Born: Elizabeth Maria Lloyd c. 1812 – c. 1813; Possibly Hanover or Hamburg
- Died: 14 November 1869; Blackheath, London, U.K.
- Occupations: educator missionary; letter writer
- Spouse: James Bowen Thompson (m. 1850; died 1855)
- Father: Hannibal Evans Lloyd
- Relatives: Susette Harriet Smith (sister); Henry Lloyd (grandfather); Chevalier de Johnstone (great-uncle); Henry Salt (first-cousin-once-removed)
- Writing career
- Language: English
- Notable work: The Daughters of Syria

Signature
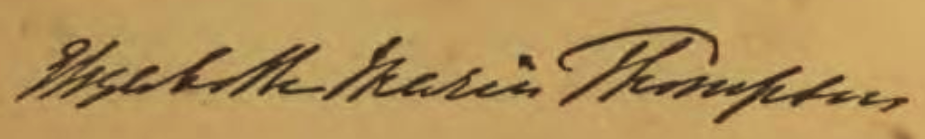

Elizabeth Maria Bowen Thompson (née Lloyd; c. 1812 – c. 1813 – 14 November 1869), also known by the pen name Mrs. Bowen Thompson, was a British educator missionary who founded the British Syrian Schools. Early on, she was brought under strong religious influences. After being widowed herself, she developed an affinity for the widows of the Crimean War, Indian Rebellion of 1857, and 1860 Mount Lebanon civil war, and provided them with support. Her simple and graphic letters narrated her life's work. The Daughters of Syria was published in 1872.

== Early life and education ==
Thompson was born Elizabeth Maria Lloyd between 1812 and 1813 possibly in Hamburg (Note: Thompson's father lived in Hamburg from 1800 to 1813.) or Hanover (Note: Thompson's elder sister Susette Harriet Smith is cited as possibly being born in Hanover.) to a British father and a German mother. Her father, Hannibal Evans Lloyd, was a British philologist and translator, and her mother, Lucy Anna Margaretta Lloyd (née von Schwartzkopff; c. 1782 – c. 1783–1855), was from Hamburg.

One of five siblings, Lloyd was the sister of the writers and educational missionaries Susette Harriet Smith and Augusta Mott. Through her father, Lloyd was the paternal granddaughter of Henry Lloyd, a Welsh army officer and military writer, the great-niece of Chevalier de Johnstone, a Scottish memoirist, and the first-cousin-once-removed of the Egyptologist Henry Salt. Reading English classics under her father, Lloyd received her education about morals from her mother and held a strong religiosity from a young age.

== Career ==
In 1850, in London, she married Dr. James Bowen Thompson, a Scottish physician and missionary of similar religious sympathies. He was the head of the British Syrian Hospital at Damascus from 1843 to 1848. He had large plans for Syria, and hoped to open it out by providing railways to India along the valley of the Euphrates. In pursuance of this scheme, the husband and wife went first to Constantinople, and then settled on some property which the doctor owned near Antioch.

She soon mastered the language, and was sorry for the women and their degraded state. She formed several little schools. During the year and a half of their residence, they gave the schools a good start. When they left, they donated the work to a native Christian teacher and some Armenians, with the hope that it would be carried on.

When the Crimean War broke out in 1853, Dr. Bowen Thompson offered his medical experience to the Government. He had gained much knowledge of Eastern epidemics, and he wanted to give his service to the English government. In Balaklava, Dr. Bowen Thompson was stricken with the endemic typhoid fever. He was also a victim of red tapeism: as a "civilian", he could not be taken into the military hospital, but was left on board ship on 5 August 1855. (Note: According to the University of Glasgow, Dr. Bowen Thompson was moved to Kululee Hospital, in Constantinople, where he died on 5 August 1855.) It was a horrible experience, and Bowne Thompson wrote to Queen Victoria, explaining what had happened. The Queen was said to have taken measures that no such mistake should be mad againe.

After burying her husband, Bowen Thompson made her home with her sister in England. She became involved with social work projects. When the Indian Rebellion of 1857 (1857–58) followed the Crimean War, Bowen Thompson joined the Lady Mayoress' Committee at the Mansion House and threw herself into providing necessaries for the sufferers. She formed an Association for the Wives of Soldiers under the patronage of the Queen.

The massacre of the Maronites by the Syrian Druses during the 1860 Mount Lebanon civil war attracted Bowen Thompson's sympathy. All the males from 7–70 years of age had been killed. She gave generously providing stores and clothing but she wanted to be in Syria with the widows. She started in October 1860, intending to spend the next half-year at Beirut. There, she met some of these women to consult as to what could best be done for them. "We look," they said, "to England to do us justice for the blood of our husbands and sons."

In 1860, the plan for an industrial refuge -an association for the improvement of the condition of the Syrian women- rapidly formed itself in her mind. 20,000 women were crowding the city eager to get work at even road-mending, destitute after the massacre. Ignorance and deeply-cherished revenge chiefly characterised them. She opened a class in her hotel. The landlord himself became the first pupil. She secured an Arabic teacher. The scheme began to run. Already she saw her future school at Beirut. It was to have a classroom for little children, an industrial department for women and girls, a department for obtaining work for the unemployed, and a store-room for the supplies which she confidently expected would flow in from England. In fact, the school was plain. She was very fortunate in securing, at this stage, the co-operation of Mr. and Mrs. Mott, who devoted themselves to carry out the same ends. This all enabled her to set up the British Syrian Schools Association, which would eventually form part of the wider work of the Middle East Christian Outreach organisation (1959) and then SIM (Serving In Mission) in 2016.

By the end of 1861, a house was secured. It was at once occupied by some 30 Hasbeyan widows. The number increased so rapidly that within a month, three schools were in active operation. Subscriptions began to come in, and interest in the work grew. Soon a fourth school was started in a stable. Still, the number of applicants were greater than she could receive. Yet another school was filled with 90 children, and a few days later a fifth school was formed for young women. She also found it necessary to open a girls' school for the upper classes, who were willing to pay a fee for the privilege of having their daughters educated by an English woman rather than by the French nuns.

Lord Shaftesbury was much interested in all that was being done, and gave the weight of his name and influence to procure Bowen Thompson the financial help she required. But all on the spot were quite enthusiastic. The officers of the fleet anchored off Beirut used to send her all their washing to be done by her women in the laundry which she set up. One of the captains presented her with a mangle, and the ship's carpenters put up all the fittings. Once, when money ran short and she could not pay her widows for their work, she called them and bid them all join in prayer with her to ask for help. That day, a visit was paid by the harem of a Turkish Pasha. The women presented a purse of piastres on leaving the school, and when Bowen Thompson came to count the coins, she found that they totalled up to three Turkish liras, or exactly the sum which was needed to pay her widows.

In the early summer of 1862, the schools were visited by the then Prince of Wales, His Majesty, King Edward VII. This was a great event. The Prince was greeted by the children with the British National Anthem, and was much pleased with all he saw. After some practical questions which proved how thoroughly he comprehended what was being done, the Prince contributed 25 Napoléons to the school, and gave a large order for embroidery.

A school was soon started at Hasbaya, where one of the most terrible of the massacres had taken place. Bowen Thompson went throughout the whole district planning where best her centres of education might be planted. From Hasbeya, she ascended Mount Hermon, and from its summit, was able to down upon the land. When Canon Henry Baker Tristram visited the neighbourhood, some while after, the women inquired if he had any things which needed to be washed, or clothes to be mended. He noted, "... that the benefits of Mrs. Thompson's education descended to the very practical details of everyday life, and when I told them that Sitt (Mrs.) Thompson was a dear friend of mine, they clapped their hands for joy."

In 1864, there were already eighteen schools in full swing, and still more places asked for them. The seventh annual examination of scholars took place in 1867 at Beirut. During three days, everyone in Beirut society, came out to see the children. On one occasion there were about a thousand people present.

In 1867, the governor of Mount Lebanon, Daoud Pasha was so impressed by Bowen Thompson that he gave her his confidence and support. The Pasha accompanied her to the village of Afn Zahalteh, where she wanted permission to open a school. He offered his arm and went with her to seek a suitable house, but they were defeated by the squalor. Bowen Thompson later received the offer of part of a dirty house. She therefore tied a handkerchief over her head, and set to work, till others followed her example. After a while carpenters and masons gave their help to put up partitions and stop holes, besides putting up shelves and benches. When the Pasha returned he found a transformation. He contributed 1000 francs toward the new school-house, to replace the temporary room. Later on, a school was started at Damascus by Pasha. As usual, Bowen Thompson did not stop to consider ways and means, but just commenced. Having found the right teacher, she arranged to pay her a monthly salary The Maronite priests were opposed to starting a school at Zachleh, but they protested in vain. The schoolhouse, built in Moorish style, was constructed on the steep side of the village hill.

Bowen Thompson could not have set on foot so many branches of work had not her sister and brother-in-law (Mr. Mentor Mott) from England joined her. Their home in England having been burned down (all family records and correspondence were destroyed by the fire which consumed their mansion at East Coombe two months after Bowen Thompson left for Syria), they resolved, rather than rebuild, to put their means and their lives to work for the Syrian people. A younger sister had already been helping Bowen Thompson for some time, so that there were four members of her family in Syria.

After nine years, she had established 23 schools, containing approximately 1,700 pupils under 56 teachers. These schools became centres of Gospel teaching and secular knowledge. Many settlements applied to have a school opened. Infant schools, orphanages, Sunday schools, schools for cripples, Moslem boarding schools, and schools for the blind were in proper working order throughout the Lebanon, supported by her sister and Bowen Thompson.

== Later life ==
During the summer of 1869, Bowen Thompson suffered from weakness. In the early autumn, she returned to her sister at Blackheath. Toward the end, she asked them to telegraph Beirut and ask that the children might pray for her. She died on 14 November 1869. After her death, her writings were edited and published in 1872 as The Daughters of Syria.

== Selected works ==
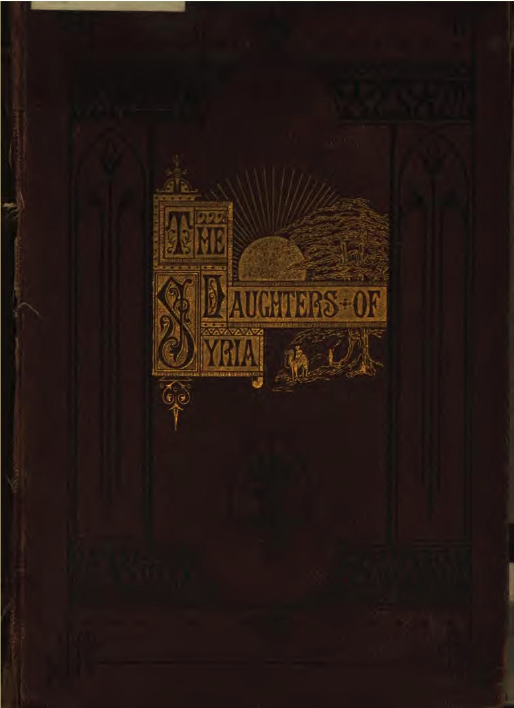
The Daughters of Syria (1872)

- The Daughters of Syria, 1872 (Text)
