= John Coney =

John Coney may refer to:

- John Coney (silversmith) (1655–1722), American silversmith
- John Coney (engraver) (1786–1833), British artist
- John Coney Moulton (1886–1926), British zoologist
