= Christopher William Long =

British diplomat (1938–2023)

British Ambassador to Hungary
- In office 1995-1998

British Ambassador to Egypt
- In office 1992-1995

British Ambassador to Switzerland
- In office 1988–1992

Personal details
- Born: 9 April 1938
- Died: 5 May 2023 (aged 85)
- Spouse: Patricia Stanbridge (m. 1972)
- Children: 3
- Education: MECAS

Christopher William Long CMG (9 April 1938 – 5 May 2023) was a British diplomat. Following his retirement in 1998, Long served as director of the Oxford University Foreign Service Programme from 1999 to 2003.

== Diplomatic career ==
Christopher Long joined HM Diplomatic Service as Third Secretary in 1963, and went to study Arabic at MECAS in Lebanon in 1964. He was posted as Third Secretary later Second Secretary to Jedda in 1965, and two years later was posted as First Secretary to Caracas. He returned to the FCO in London in 1969. He became Head of Chancery in Budapest in 1974 and attended the Belgrade CSCE Meeting in 1977. Long was posted as Counsellor to Damascus in 1978, and to UKMIS Geneva in 1980. He was appointed Head of the FCO's Near East and North Africa Department in 1983. He became Assistant Under-Secretary of State (concurrently Deputy Chief Clerk and Chief Inspector) in the FCO in 1985. Long served as the United Kingdom's Ambassador to Switzerland (1988–1992), Egypt (1992–1995) and Hungary (1995–1998).

== Post-retirement ==
From 1998, Long was a director of Gedeon Richter Ltd., the largest pharmaceutical factory in Hungary. He was also a trustee of The Orders of St John Care Trust.

== Personal life and death ==
Long married Patricia Ann Eleanor Stanbridge in 1972. They had one daughter (born 1974) and two sons (born 1977 and 1982).

Long died on 5 May 2023, at the age of 85.

Diplomatic posts
Preceded by John Rich	British Ambassador to Switzerland; 1988–1992	Succeeded by David Beattie
Preceded by Sir James Adams	British Ambassador to Egypt; 1992–1995	Succeeded by Sir David Blatherwick
Preceded by Sir John Birch	British Ambassador to Hungary; 1995–1998	Succeeded by Nigel Thorpe
Academic offices
Preceded by Sir Robin Fearn	Director of Oxford University Foreign Service Programme; 1999–2003	Succeeded by Alan Hunt as Diplomatic Director
Preceded by Sir Robin Fearn	Director of Oxford University Foreign Service Programme; 1999–2003	Succeeded by Rodney Bruce Hall as Academic Director
