= Evelyn Baring, 1st Earl of Cromer =

British statesman, diplomat and colonial administrator (1841–1917)

The Right Honourable The Earl of Cromer GCB OM GCMG KCSI CIE PC FRS
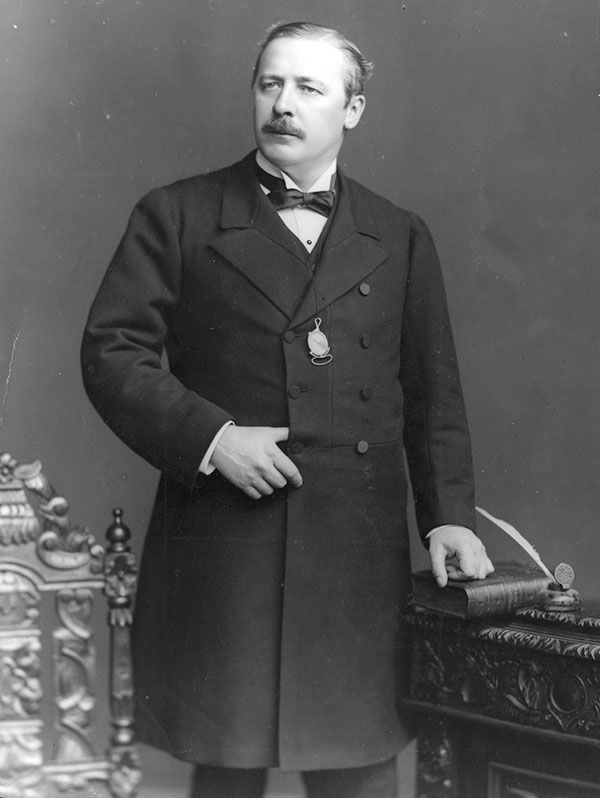
- The Earl of Cromer in 1895

Consul-General of Egypt
- In office 11 September 1883 – 6 May 1907
- Nominated by: William Ewart Gladstone
- Appointed by: Victoria
- Monarchs: Tawfiq Pasha; Abbas Helmi II
- Preceded by: Edward Baldwin Malet; (Controller-General)
- Succeeded by: Eldon Gorst

Controller-General in Egypt
- In office 1878–1879
- Nominated by: Benjamin Disraeli, the Earl of Beaconsfield
- Appointed by: Queen Victoria
- Monarch: Isma'il Pasha
- Preceded by: Office established
- Succeeded by: Edward Baldwin Malet

Personal details
- Born: Evelyn Baring; 26 February 1841 Cromer, Norfolk, England
- Died: 29 January 1917 (aged 75) Westminster, London, England
- Spouses: Ethel Errington (d. 1898); Katherine Thynne (m. 1901)
- Children: Rowland Baring, 2nd Earl of Cromer, b. 1877; Hon. Windham Baring, b. 1880; Evelyn Baring, 1st Baron Howick of Glendale, b. 1903; Louisa Sophia, b. before 1864
- Education: Royal Military Academy; Staff College, Camberley
- Occupation: Military officer, politician
- Awards: Knight Grand Cross of the Order of the Bath; Member of the Order of Merit; Knight Grand Cross of the Order of St Michael and St George; Knight Commander of the Order of the Star of India; Companion of the Order of the Indian Empire

Military service
- Allegiance: United Kingdom
- Branch/service: Army
- Years of service: 1860–1877
- Rank: Major
- Unit: Royal Artillery

Evelyn Baring, 1st Earl of Cromer, GCB, OM, GCMG, KCSI, CIE, PC, FRS (/ˈkroʊmər/; 26 February 1841 – 29 January 1917) was a British statesman, diplomat and colonial administrator. He served as the British controller-general in Egypt during 1879, part of the international control which oversaw Egyptian finances after the Egyptian bankruptcy of 1876. He later became the agent and consul-general in Egypt from 1883 to 1907 during the British occupation, prompted by the Urabi revolt. This position gave Baring de facto control over Egyptian finances and governance.

Baring's programmes led to limited economic development in Egypt in certain areas, but deepened its dependence on cash crops, as well as regressing some of its social developments (such as the state school system).

== Early life and military career ==
Baring was the ninth son of Henry Baring and his second wife, Cecilia Anne (née Windham). The English branch of the Baring family descends from Johann Baring (later, "John"), who emigrated from Germany in 1717. John's son Sir Francis was the founder of Barings Bank. Henry was the third son of Sir Francis. When he died in 1848, seven-year old Evelyn was sent to boarding school. When he was 14, he entered the Royal Military Academy, graduating at 17 with a lieutenant's commission in the Royal Artillery. He was initially posted to a battery on the island of Corfu.

While on Corfu, Baring became aware of his own lack of education, and began a campaign of self-education, learning Greek and becoming fluent in Italian. He also took a mistress and fathered a daughter out of wedlock, Louisa Sophia. In 1862, he accepted a position as aide-de-camp to Sir Henry Storks, High Commissioner of the Ionian Islands. This position ended in 1864, with the union of Corfu with Greece. Later in 1864, Storks was appointed the governor of Malta, again employing Baring as an aide-de-camp. The next year Baring accompanied Storks to Jamaica, where Storks headed the official inquiry into the Morant Bay rebellion. In 1868, Baring was selected to attend the Army's Staff College; he graduated in late 1869. He then worked for two years in the War Office, helping to implement post-Crimean War reforms. In 1871 he was promoted to second captain.

Finding a military career not to his liking, Baring went to India in 1872 as private secretary to his cousin Lord Northbrook, Viceroy of India, and quickly discovered that he had a knack for administration. With Northbrook's resignation in 1876, Baring returned to England and married Ethel Errington, daughter of Sir Rowland Errington, 11th Baronet. He was appointed Companion of the Order of the Star of India (CSI) and promoted to major in 1878. The following year he resigned from the army.

== British Controller-General of Egypt ==
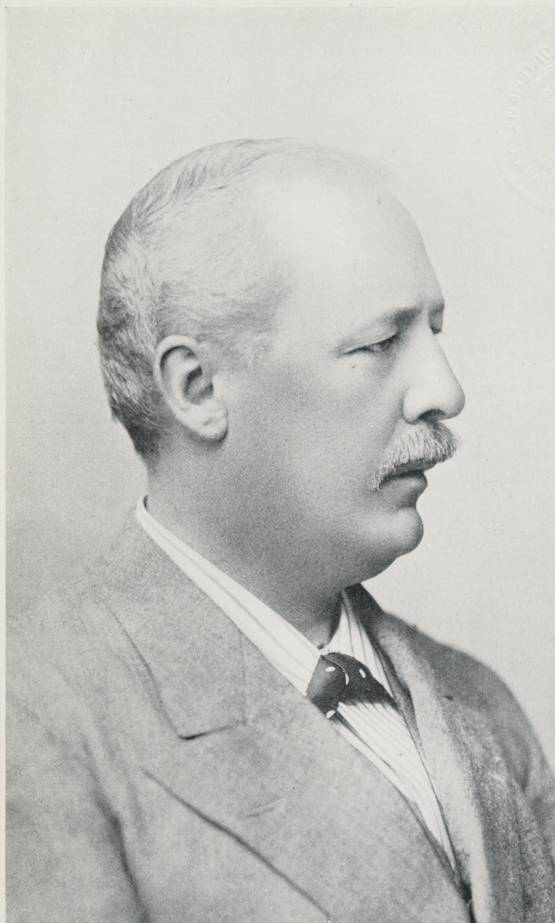
The Earl of Cromer

When Baring first arrived in Egypt in 1877, the country's finances were in shambles. Ismail Pasha, Khedive of Egypt, borrowed millions of pounds from European financiers for projects to build the Suez Canal, his personal use, and to cover persistent tax shortfalls. His finances depended on money obtained from Egypt's cotton industry, which flourished during the American Civil War. But after the war, as American cotton entered European markets once again, the price of cotton fell dramatically. As a result, Egypt's cotton was no longer the cash crop it used to be. Ismail Pasha found himself unable to pay off even the interest on his debts.

At first, Ismail attempted to call on his parliament to raise more tax money, but Parliament resisted, as it consisted mostly of large landowners, who were lightly taxed. In desperation, Ismail turned to the European powers to help him out of his financial troubles. After some rocky negotiations the Dual Control system was instituted, whereby a French and a British controller were appointed to oversee Egypt's finances. Sir Evelyn Baring was appointed as the British Controller. Egyptian historian Afaf Lufti al-Sayyid-Marsot considers this desperate attempt on Ismail's part to obtain European help to have opened the way for foreign control of Egypt's finances, and eventual incorporation of Egypt into the British Empire.

Despite, Sir Evelyn's ties to Barings Bank through his family, and that bank's significant financial stake in Egyptian debt, no concern for apparent conflict of interest in his appointment was ever apparent; nor did the possibility of mixed motives ever give the government pause in supporting Baring's economic programmes.

Baring and his fellow controller's de facto control of Egypt's finances meant they wielded considerable influence in both the Egyptian and British governments. When Ismail refused to declare bankruptcy, Baring pressured his government to depose Ismail, which they did in 1879. The general population of Egypt widely blamed Ismail for the country's financial struggles, and his removal was greeted with relief. Ismail was succeeded by his son Tawfiq, who cooperated with the European consuls.

== Consul-General of Egypt ==
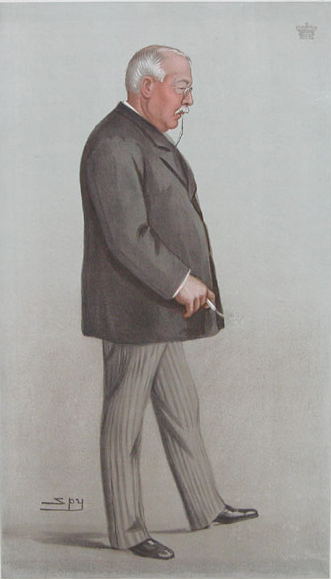
Baring caricatured by Spy for Vanity Fair, 1902

The 'Urabi Revolt, led by Ahmed 'Urabi, a rising Egyptian colonel, endangered the Khedivate. After the subsequent intervention by the British in Alexandria (the 1882 Anglo-Egyptian War), Baring returned from India to Egypt as the British agent and consul-general, "with a mandate for minor reforms and a prompt withdrawal of British troops". Baring though advocated for a continued occupation of Egypt and disparaged Egyptian demands for independence.

Baring's first act as Consul-General was to approve of the Dufferin Report, which essentially called for a puppet parliament with no real power. The report asserted the need for British supervision of reforms deemed necessary for the country. It stated the interests of the Suez Canal zone should always be maintained. Baring believed that because of Egyptian administrative incompetence, a long occupation was essential to any sort of reform. He established a new guiding principle for Egypt known as the Granville Doctrine (named for the Secretary of State for Foreign Affairs, Lord Granville). The doctrine enabled Baring and other British officials to fill the government with those Egyptian politicians that would be cooperative with the British and the power to dismiss Egyptian ministers who refused to accept British directives. Under Baring, British officials were positioned in key ministries and a new system, known as the Veiled Protectorate, was introduced. Essentially, the government was a façade. Egyptian ministers were the outward form, yet British officials held the actual power. Baring thus remained the real ruler of Egypt until 1907, and this arrangement worked well for the first ten years of British control because Tawfiq Pasha was a weak man more than happy to abdicate any governmental responsibility.

The Egyptian army, which Baring considered utterly untrustworthy due to its previous mutinies against the Khedive, was disbanded and a new army organised along British lines (much like in India). With Egyptian finances stabilised by 1887, Baring also compelled the government in Cairo to abandon any pretension of reconquering the Sudan, which Egypt had lost control of following the Mahdist Rebellion. Careful –and often stingy– handling of the budget, plus promotion of irrigation projects, brought considerable economic prosperity to Egypt. Baring believed that at some point in the future, British control of Egypt would end, and full independence would be restored, but only once the Egyptian people learned proper self-governance. Al-Sayyid-Marsot contends that under Baring, Egyptian nationalists were inert and many Egyptians believed in Britain's policy of "rescue and retire", but that Baring had no intention of doing so as, al-Sayyid says, "Baring believed that 'subject races' were totally incapable of self-government, that they did not really need or want self-government, and that what they really needed was a 'full belly' policy which kept it quiescent and allowed the elite to make money and so cooperate with the occupying power."

In 1892, Tawfiq died and Abbas Hilmi II succeeded him. The young, ambitious khedive wanted to expel foreign influence and to that end encouraged a nationalist movement, but he had not reckoned with Baring, who quickly intimidated him into submission. Research, however, has shown that the Egyptian nationalist movement was active until the late 1890s, mainly from the secret societies surrounding the new Khedive. These were led by the young nationalist leader Mustafa Kamil and supported by foreign local elements, especially among the French and Greek communities of Egypt. Lord Cromer had a negative experience in India, where advanced education led to Indian nationalism that was highly critical of the Raj. In Egypt Cromer reduced the budget for education, closed many of the specialised postsecondary institutions, and refocused the curriculum on vocational topics. Tuition fees were imposed which reduced the availability for most Egyptians.

Baring was embroiled in controversy in both Egypt and Britain in the wake of severe punishments meted out to Egyptian peasants following the 1906 Denshawai Incident, even though he was out of the country at the time and had no direct involvement. The new Liberal government under Prime Minister Sir Henry Campbell-Bannerman decided to adopt a more lenient policy towards Egypt, and Baring, sensing the end was near, offered his resignation in April 1907. The official reason given for his departure was health issues. In July 1907, Parliament awarded him £50,000 in recognition of his "eminent services" in Egypt.

=== Honours ===
Baring was in August 1901 created Viscount Errington, of Hexham, in the County of Northumberland, and Earl of Cromer, in the County of Norfolk. In June 1902 he received an honorary doctorate (Doctor of Civil Law) from the University of Oxford, and in 1906, Baring was made a Member of the Order of Merit by King Edward VII.

== Baring, women, and Islam ==
Baring held a traditional perspective in relation to the East, Egypt in particular, believing Westerners to be inherently superior in every way when compared to Egyptians. According to Edward Said, Baring believed the 'Orient' and its inhabitants were meant to be subdued and disciplined by the Western world.

In 1901 Baring discovered that increased enrollment in primary schools had resulted in a growing demand for secondary school enrollment opportunities. Women and men alike had begun to seek higher education as an opportunity to be eligible for government positions and upward mobility. Instead of increasing Egyptians' opportunities to receive education, Baring held that subsidised education was not the province of the government and instead raised tuition fees at existing primary schools in order to cut enrollment. Both women's and men's institutions suffered from Baring's new legislation, fuelled by his fear that an educated working class might foster dangerous nationalistic sentiments against the colonial government. Baring went on to curb opportunities for women already working in the professional world by discrediting their skill; he urged Egyptians that female doctors were not as adept as their male counterparts and that, in the Western world, men were the most trusted medical practitioners. When Egyptians complained about the lack of jobs available to them (due in large part to limited access to education), Baring went so far as to deny the existence of an Egyptian nationality. He worked specifically to limit employment opportunities for women.

In line with his Orientalist views, Baring believed Egyptian society and the Islamic world as a whole to be inherently inferior to the Western world. As such, it was a culture that, in Baring's eyes, bred inferior people with inferior minds and ideas. According to Baring, Egypt could only succeed in the modern world once it had eliminated Islam from its culture. In particular, Baring believed the subordinate nature of Eastern culture was made blatantly obvious in its treatment of women. Baring argued that Westernised Christianity elevated the status of women while Islam taught that women should be degraded through the veil and segregation based on gender.

Baring's opinions on segregation and the veil in particular went on to influence popular and academic discourse surrounding issues of women and Islam. Baring initiated unveiling campaigns during his time in Egypt. Qasim Amin, a French-educated upper-middle class lawyer was deemed one of the first feminists due to his rejection of the veil as oppressive—an opinion grounded largely in Baring's original argument. Amin's work, influenced by Baring's ideas, served as some of the foundational literature that inserted women and their 'subjugation' in Islam into prominent discourse surrounding colonial rule and westernisation. Outside of written works, the artist Ya’qub Sanu’a (educated, like Amin, in Europe) drew political cartoons, one of which depicted women representing Egypt, Russia, France, and Britain with the Egyptian woman entirely covered. His policies are considered to by some to be representative of the "white man's burden" attitude.

== Later years ==
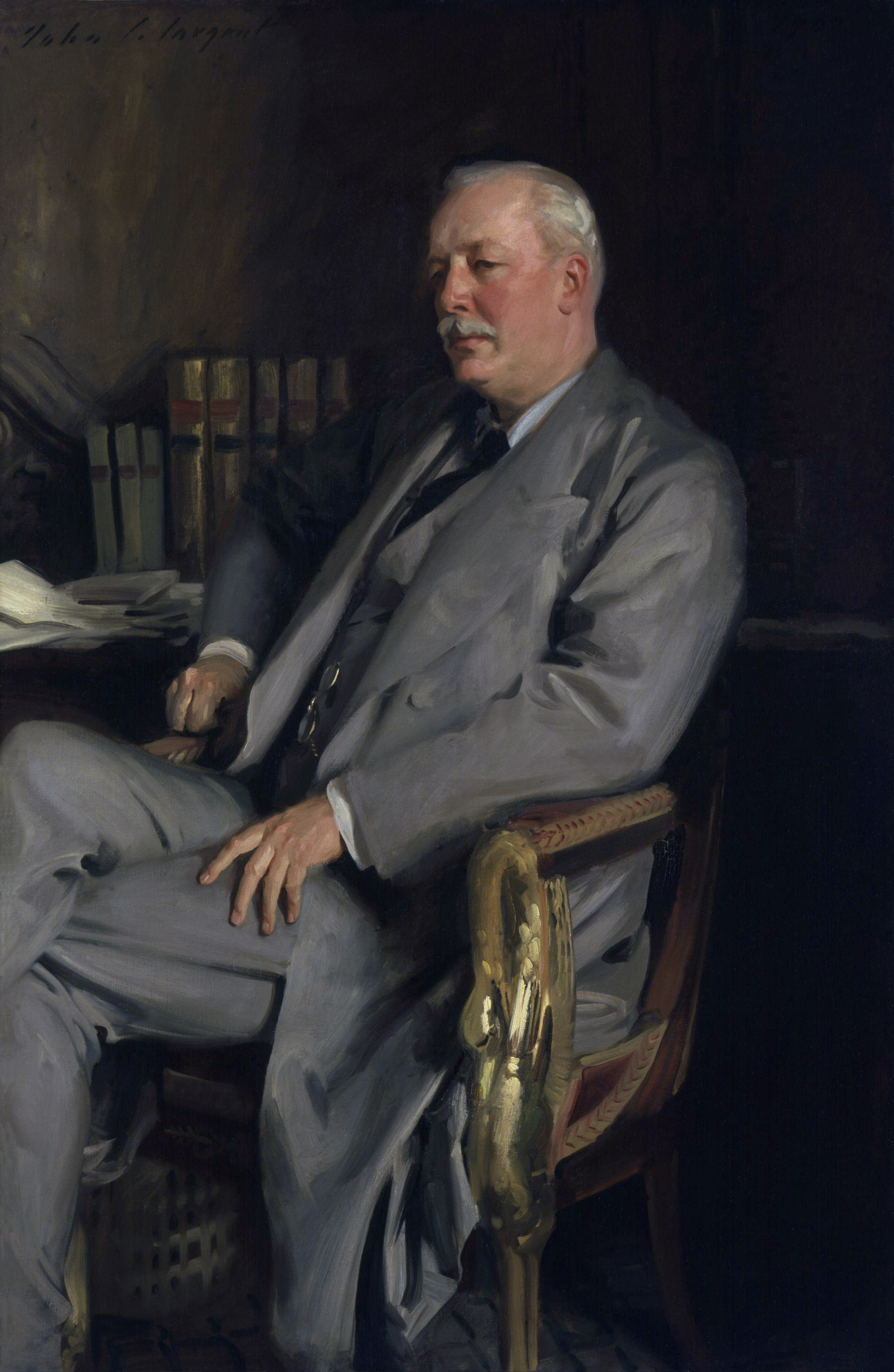
Cromer by J. S. Sargent

Baring returned to Britain at the age of 66 and spent a year regaining his health. In 1908, he published, in two volumes, Modern Egypt, a narrative of events in Egypt and the Sudan since 1876. In 1910, he published Ancient and Modern Imperialism, an influential comparison of the British and Roman Empires. In 1914, after World War I broke out, the Khedive Abbas II of Egypt supported the Ottomans and was deposed by the British. This freed Baring to publish his impressions of the Khedive, Abbas II, in 1915.

A lover of the classics, Baring was very well-read and spoke Greek, Latin, Italian, French, and Turkish, but he never bothered to learn Arabic – the language of the lower classes in Egypt. During the opening years of the 20th century, a nationalist movement began to appear in Egypt, but Baring, who became increasingly aloof with age, brushed it off as inconsequential.

Baring was active in politics. Having been raised to the peerage as Lord Cromer in 1892, Baring was entitled to sit in the House of Lords. He joined the free-trade wing of the Unionist Party. Baring was a leader of the anti-suffragette cause, serving as the president of the Men's League for Opposing Woman Suffrage in 1908, then in 1910–1912, the subsequent National League for Opposing Woman Suffrage.

In 1916 and aged 75, Cromer was appointed to chair the Dardanelles Commission, but it was too much strain for him to handle. In poor health, he would summon meetings at his house if forbidden to go out of doors. Historian John Grigg writes that he was "in effect killed by" the strain of the Commission.

Baring died on 29 January 1917; he is buried at Wimborne Road Cemetery, Bournemouth, at that in time in Hampshire, now in Dorset.

== Family ==
Among his siblings were brothers Edward Baring, 1st Baron Revelstoke, diplomat Walter Baring, and banker Tom Baring. Cromer's only daughter, Louisa Sophia, an ex-nuptial child, was born between 1859 and 1864. He had three sons: Rowland Baring, 2nd Earl of Cromer (1877–1953), who succeeded to his title; the Hon. Windham Baring (1880–1922), who became a director of Baring Brothers bank; and Evelyn Baring, 1st Baron Howick of Glendale (1903−1973), who was a High Commissioner for Southern Africa, and a Governor of Kenya. His youngest son's grand-daughter Mary Wakefield married the political advisor Dominic Cummings.

== Selected works ==
Publications by Lord Cromer include:

- Modern Egypt. New York: The Macmillan Company. 2001 ed. (reprint) vol 1. ISBN 1-4021-8339-9 and vol 2. ISBN 1-4021-7830-1
  - Modern Egypt, vol. I. New York: MacMillan, 1908
  - Modern Egypt, vol. II. New York: MacMillan, 1908
- Ancient and Modern Imperialism, New York: Longmans, 1910
- Disraeli, London: MacMillan, 1912
- Political and Literary Essays, London: MacMillan, 1913

== Sources ==
=== Books and journals ===
- Ahmed, Leila (1992). Women and Gender in Islam. New Haven: Yale University Press.
- Baron, Beth (2005). Egypt as a woman: Nationalism, gender, and politics. Berkeley: University of California Press. ISBN 978-0520251540.
- Cleveland, William L.; Bunton, Martin (2009). A history of the modern Middle East (4th ed.). Westview Press. ISBN 978-0-8133-4374-7.
- Darwin, J. G. (2004). "Baring, Evelyn, first earl of Cromer (1841–1917)". Oxford Dictionary of National Biography (online, Jan 2008 ed.). Oxford University Press. doi:10.1093/ref:odnb/30583. (Subscription, Wikipedia Library access or UK public library membership required.)
- Debrett's peerage, and titles of courtesy. London: Dean. 1921. pp. 256−257.
- Gorst, Eldon (1905). "Lord Cromer in Egypt" . The Empire and the century. London: John Murray. pp. 760–772.
- Grigg, John (2002) [1985]. Lloyd George: From Peace To War 1912-16. Penguin. ISBN 0-140-28426-5.
- Harrison, Robert T. (1995). Gladstone's imperialism in Egypt: techniques of domination. Greenwood
- Kazamias, Alexander (2014). "9. Cromer's Assault on 'Internationalism': British Colonialism and the Greeks of Egypt, 1882–1907". In Booth, Marilyn; Anthony, Gorman (eds.). The long 1890s in Egypt: Colonial quiescence, subterranean resistance. Edinburgh: Edinburgh University Press. pp. 253–283. doi:10.3366/edinburgh/9780748670123.003.0010. ISBN 9780748670123.
- Kernaghan, Jennifer (1993). Lord Cromer as Orientalist and social engineering in Egypt, 1882–1907 (MA). University of British Columbia. "bibliography pp. 104–107"
- Jenkins, Roy (1995). Gladstone: A Biography. London: Macmillan. ISBN 978-0812966411.
- Marlowe, John (1970). Cromer in Egypt. Praeger, 332pp
- Marlowe, John (1965). A History of Modern Egypt and Anglo-Egyptian Relations: 1800–1956. Archon Books,
- Meyer, Karl E. and Shareen Blair Brysac (2008). Kingmakers: The Invention of the Modern Middle East. W.W. Norton. ISBN 978-0-393-06199-4
- Moaddel, Mansour (2005). Islamic modernism, nationalism and fundamentalism: episode and discourse. Chicago: The University of Chicago Press.
- Mowat, R. C. (1973). "From Liberalism to Imperialism: The Case of Egypt 1875–1887". Historical Journal. 16 (1): 109–124. doi:10.1017/S0018246X00003733. JSTOR 2637918. S2CID 162724338.
- Owen, Roger (2004). Lord Cromer: Victorian Imperialist, Edwardian Proconsul. Oxford University Press. ISBN 0-19-925338-2.
- Raymond, John (March 1960). "Cromer: Part 1: The Proconsul". History Today. 10 (3): 180–186.
- Raymond, John (April 1960). "Cromer: Part 23: The Miracle of Egypt". History Today. 10 (4): 240–246.
- Robinson, Ronald; Gallagher, John (1981). "V: Gladstone's Bondage in Egypt". Africa and the Victorians: The official mind of imperialism. with Alice Denny (Second ed.). Macmillan. pp. 122–159. ISBN 978-0333310069.
- Said, Edward W. (1979). Orientalism. New York: Vintage Books: Random House.
- al-Sayyid-Marsot, Afaf Lutfi (2007). A History of Egypt: From the Arab conquest to the present (2nd ed.). Cambridge: Cambridge University Press. ISBN 978-0521700764.
- al-Sayyid-Marsot, Afaf Lutfi (1985). A Short History of Modern Egypt. Cambridge: Cambridge University Press. p. 76. ISBN 9780521272346.
- al-Sayyid-Marsot, Afaf Lutfi (1968). Egypt and Cromer: A study in Anglo-Egyptian relations. London: John Murray.
- Stephan, Rita; Charrad, Mounira M., eds. (2020). Women rising: In and beyond the Arab Spring. Cambridge: Cambridge University Press. ISBN 978-1479883035. JSTOR j.ctv1n6ptkm.
- Tignor, R. L. (1966). Modernization and British colonial rule in Egypt, 1882–1914
- Tignor, R. L. (2011). Egypt: A Short History – via Google Books.
- Tignor, Robert L. (May 1963). "Lord Cromer: Practitioner and Philosopher of Imperialism". Journal of British Studies. 2 (2): 142–159. JSTOR 175255.
- Wilkinson, Toby (2020). A World Beneath the Sands: Adventurers and Archaeologists in the Golden Age of Egyptology. London: Picador. ISBN 978-1-5098-5870-5.

=== News periodicals and websites ===
- "Review: Modern Egypt. By the Earl of Cromer. 2 vols. (Macmillan & Co.) (SECOND NOTICE.)". The Athenaeum. No. 4196. 28 March 1908. pp. 376–378.
- "Evelyn Baring, 1st Earl of Cromer". London Remembers.
- Miller, C. R. (21 March 1908). "Lord Cromer's Work in Egypt". The New York Times. Archived from the original on 3 March 2018. "Except the £16,000,000 spent in the construction of the Suez Canal, all the money borrowed in this period 'was squandered'."
- Reid, Donald (July 2004). "Review of Lord Cromer: Victorian Imperialist, Edwardian Proconsul". Reviews in History. Institute of Historical Research; School of Advanced Study, University of London. ISSN 1749-8155. (review no. 414). Archived from the original on 19 May 2022.
- "Earl Cromer". The Star. No. 11901. 9 January 1917. p. 5 – via 'Papers Past'–National Library of New Zealand.
- "University intelligence". The Times. No. 36788. 7 June 1902. p. 9.
- "Obituary: Mr. Windham Baring". The Times. No. 43225. 29 December 1922. pp. 11–12. Gale CS186192797 – via Gale Academic OneFile.
- Dean and Chapter of Westminster. "Evelyn Baring, 1st Earl of Cromer: Statesman". Archived from the original on 15 September 2022.

Diplomatic posts
Preceded by Sir Edward Malet	British Agent and Consul-General in Egypt; 1883–1907	Succeeded by Sir Eldon Gorst
Peerage of the United Kingdom
New creation	Earl of Cromer; 1901–1917	Succeeded by Rowland Thomas Baring
New creation	Viscount Cromer; 1899–1917	Succeeded by Rowland Thomas Baring
New creation	Baron Cromer; 1892–1917	Succeeded by Rowland Thomas Baring
