= List of ambassadors of the United Kingdom to Egypt =

British Ambassador to Egypt سفير المملكة المتحدة لدى مصر
- Coat of Arms of the United Kingdom
- Incumbent; Mark Bryson-Richardson since 2025
- Style: His Excellency
- Residence: Cairo
- Appointer: King Charles III
- Inaugural holder: George Baldwin; British Consul-General to Egypt 1786
- Website: www.gov.uk/government/world/egypt

The ambassador of the United Kingdom to Egypt is the United Kingdom's foremost diplomatic representative in Egypt, and head of the UK's diplomatic mission in Egypt. The official title is His Britannic Majesty's Ambassador to the Arab Republic of Egypt.

Under the British occupation of Egypt (1882–1956), the British consul-general, high commissioner, or ambassador effectively ruled Egypt.

== List of heads of mission ==
=== Consuls-general ===
- 1786–1796: George Baldwin (post abolished in 1793 but letter did not reach Baldwin until 1796)
- 1803–1804: Charles Lock (appointed but died en route to Egypt)
- 1804–1815: Ernest Missett (Agent, then Consul-General)
- 1815–1827: Henry Salt
- 1827–1833: John Barker (acting until 1829)
- 1833–1839: Patrick Campbell
- 1839–1841: Sir George Lloyd Hodges
- 1841–1846: Charles John Barnett
- 1846–1853: Charles Murray
- 1853–1858: Frederick Wright-Bruce
- 1858–1865: Robert Gilmour Colquhoun
- 1865–1876: Edward Stanton
- 1876–1879: Hussey Vivian
- 1879–1883: Edward Malet
- 1883–1907: Sir Evelyn Baring, Lord Cromer
- 1907–1911: Sir Eldon Gorst with rank of Minister Plenipotentiary
- 1911–1914: Herbert Kitchener, 1st Viscount Kitchener with rank of Minister Plenipotentiary

=== High commissioners ===
- 1914–1915: Sir Milne Cheetham
- 1915–1917: Sir Henry McMahon
- 1917–1919: Sir Francis Reginald Wingate
- 1919–1925: Edmund Allenby, 1st Viscount Allenby
- 1925–1929: George Lloyd, 1st Baron Lloyd
- 1929–1933: Sir Percy Loraine
- 1934–1936: Sir Miles Lampson

=== Ambassadors ===
- 1936–1946: Sir Miles Lampson
- 1946–1950: Sir Ronald Ian Campbell
- 1950–1955: Sir Ralph Stevenson
- 1955–1956: Sir Humphrey Trevelyan
- 1956–1959: Break in relations due to Suez Crisis
- 1959–1961: Sir Colin Crowe (Chargé d'affaires)
- 1961–1964: Sir Harold Beeley
- 1964–1965: Sir George Humphrey Middleton
- 1965–1967: Break in relations over Rhodesia
- 1967–1969: Sir Harold Beeley
- 1969–1973: Sir Richard Ashton Beaumont
- 1973–1975: Sir Philip Adams
- 1975–1979: Sir Willie Morris
- 1979–1985: Sir Michael Scott Weir
- 1985–1987: Sir Alan Urwick
- 1987–1992: Sir James Adams
- 1992–1995: Christopher William Long
- 1995–1999: Sir David Blatherwick
- 1999–2001: Sir Graham Boyce
- 2001–2003: Sir John Sawers
- 2003–2007: Sir Derek Plumbly
- 2007–2011: Sir Dominic Asquith
- 2011–2014: James Wilfrid Watt
- 2014–2018: John Casson
- 2018–2021: Sir Geoffrey Adams
- 2021–2025: Gareth Bayley
- 2025–present: Mark Bryson-Richardson

== See also ==
- Egypt–United Kingdom relations
- List of ambassadors of Egypt to the United Kingdom
- British foreign policy in the Middle East
