= William Francis Ainsworth =

English surgeon, traveller, geographer and geologist

William Francis Ainsworth FSA (9 November 1807 – 27 November 1896) was an English surgeon, traveller, geographer, and geologist, known also as a writer and editor.

== Life ==
Ainsworth was born in Exeter, the son of John Ainsworth of Rostherne in Cheshire, captain in the 15th and 128th regiments. The novelist William Harrison Ainsworth was his cousin; at his cousin's request he adopted the additional Christian name Francis, to avoid confusion.

In 1827 he became a licentiate of the Royal College of Surgeons of Edinburgh, where he filled the office of president in the Royal Physical society and the Plinian Society. He then went to London and Paris, where he became an intern at the École nationale supérieure des mines. While in France he also gained practical experience of geology in the Auvergne and Pyrenees. After studying at Brussels he returned to Scotland in 1829 and founded, in 1830, the Edinburgh Journal of Natural and Geographical Science, which was discontinued in the following year.

In 1831 there was an outbreak of cholera at Sunderland; Ainsworth went there to study it, and published his experiences in Observations on the Pestilential Cholera, London, 1832. This book led to his appointment as surgeon to the cholera hospital of St. George's, Hanover Square. On another outbreak, in Ireland he acted successively as surgeon of the hospitals at Westport, Ballinrobe, Claremorris, and Newport.

In 1834 Ainsworth, after studying under Sir Edward Sabine, was appointed surgeon and geologist to the expedition to the River Euphrates under Francis Rawdon Chesney. Shortly afterwards he was placed in charge of an expedition to the Christians of Chaldaea, which was sent out by the Royal Geographical Society and the Society for Promoting Christian Knowledge. He went to Mesopotamia, through Asia Minor, the passes of the Taurus Mountains, and northern Syria, reaching Mosul in the spring of 1840. During the summer he explored the Kurdistan mountains and visited Lake Urimiyeh in Persia, returning through Greater Armenia; and reached Constantinople late in 1840. This expedition had financial troubles, and Ainsworth had to find his way home at his own expense.

After his return to England in 1841 Ainsworth settled at Hammersmith, and assisted his cousin, William Harrison Ainsworth, in the conduct of several magazines, including Ainsworth's Magazine, Bentley's Miscellany, and the New Monthly Magazine. In 1871 he succeeded his cousin as editor of the New Monthly, and continued in the post until 1879.

For some years he acted as honorary secretary to the Syro-Egyptian Society, founded in 1844, and he was concerned to promote the Euphrates and Tigris valley route to India, with which Chesney's expedition had been connected. He was one of the founders of the West London Hospital, and its honorary treasurer until his death at 11 Wolverton Gardens, Hammersmith, on 27 November 1896. He was the last survivor of the original fellows of the Royal Geographical Society from its formation in 1830, was elected a Fellow of the Society of Antiquaries on 14 April 1853, and was also a corresponding member of several foreign societies. He married, and left a son and two daughters.

== Works ==
He recorded incidents of his time in Ireland in Ainsworth's Magazine and the New Monthly Magazine. In 1834 he published An Account of the Caves of Ballybunian in Kerry, Dublin.

On his return from the Euphrates expedition he published his observations under the title of 'Researches in Assyria, Babylonia, and Chaldea,' London, 1838, with a dedication to Chesney. In 1842 he published an account of the Mesopotamia expedition entitled 'Travels and Researches in Asia Minor, Mesopotamia, Chaldsea, and Armenia,' London, 2 vols. Two years later, in 1844, he produced his major work, the 'Travels in the Track of the Ten Thousand Greeks,' London, a geographical and descriptive account of the expedition of Cyrus the Great and of the retreat of his Greek mercenaries after the death of the Persian prince. In 1854 he furnished a geographical commentary to accompany the translation of Xenophon's Anabasis by John Selby Watson, which was issued in Bohn's Classical Library, and was republished in 1894 as one of Sir John Lubbock's Hundred Books.

Ainsworth was also the author of:

- 'Observations on the pestilential cholera, (asphyxia pestilenta), as it appeared at Sunderland in the months of November and December, 1831: and on the measures taken for its prevention and cure,' London, 1832.
- A number of travel reports published in the Journal of the Royal Geographical Society of London: 'Journey from Angora by Kaisariyah, Malatiyah, and Gergen Kaleh-si, to Bir or Birehjik', (vol.10, 1840, pp.275-310) , 'Notes on a Journey from Kaisariyah, by Malatiyah, to Bir or Birehjik, in May and June, 1839', (vol.10, 1840, pp.311-340) (Geographical annotations to this article by Jelle Verheij) 'Notes of an Excursion to Kal'ah Sherkat, the U'r of the Persians, and to the ruins of Al Hadhr, the Hutra of the Chaldees, and Hatra of the Romans', (vol.11, 1841, pp.1-20) 'An account of a Visit to the Chaldeans, inhabiting Central Kurdistan; and of an Ascent of the Peak of Rowandiz (Tur Sheikhiwa) in the Summer of 1840', (vol.11, 1841, pp.21-76);
- 'The Claims of the Christian Aborigines of the Turkish or Osmanli Empire upon Civilised Nations,' London, 1843.
- 'The Seven Sleepers of Ephesus' in 'Ainsworth's Magazine: a Miscellany of Romance, General Literature, & Art' Vol. V, John Mortimer, London, 1844, pp. 145–153.
- 'All Round the World, an Illustrated Record of Travels, Voyages, and Adventures,' London, 1860–2, 4 vols.
- 'The Assyrian origin of the Izedis or Yezidis - the So-Called "Devil Worshippers', in: Transactions of the Ethnological Society of London vol.1, 1861, pp.11-44
- 'Wanderings in every Clime,' London, 1872.
- 'A Personal Narrative of the Euphrates Expedition,' London, 1888, 2 vols.
- 'The River Karún, an Opening to British Commerce,' London, 1890.

He translated François Auguste Marie Mignet's 'Antonio Perez and Philip II,' London, 1846, and edited William Burckhardt Barker's ‘Cilicia: its Former History and Present State, with an Account of the Idolatrous Worship Prevailing There Previous to the Introduction of Christianity,’ 1862, and 'Lares and Penates' from the papers of William Burckhardt Barker, London, 1853.
