= Michael Scott Weir =

British diplomat (1925–2006)

Sir Michael Scott Weir KCMG

British Ambassador to Egypt
- In office 1979–1985
- Monarch: Elizabeth II
- Preceded by: Willie Morris
- Succeeded by: Alan Urwick

Personal details
- Born: 25 January 1925 Dunfermline, Fife, Scotland
- Died: 22 June 2006 (aged 81) London, England
- Spouses: Alison Walker (m. 1953; div. 1974) Hilary Reid (m. 1976)
- Children: 6, including Arabella Weir

Sir Michael Scott Weir, KCMG (28 January 1925 – 22 June 2006) was a British diplomat.

== Early life and career ==
Weir was born in Dunfermline, Fife, where his father was a primary school teacher.

He went to study oriental languages at the School of Oriental and African Studies on a state scholarship in 1942. A year later he joined the Royal Air Force, which sent him to London University to learn Persian. He was then posted as an intelligence officer, including to Burma and Iraq.

After demobilisation in 1947, he went to Balliol College, Oxford where he read classics. He joined the Foreign Service in 1950, and quickly became one of its leading Arabists. His early postings included Bahrain, Doha and Sharjah. Weir's career culminated with his appointment as the United Kingdom's ambassador to Egypt (1979–1985). In 1981, he was sitting behind Egyptian President Anwar Sadat when the president was assassinated at a military parade.

Weir retired from the Foreign Service in 1985. He served as president of the Egypt Exploration Society (1988–2006) and Director of the 21st Century Trust (1990–2000). He was the founding Chairman of the British Egyptian Society in 1990 and continued as Chairman until 2006. The society sponsors the Sir Michael Weir Annual Lecture in his honour.

== Family ==
Weir met his first wife, Alison Walker, at Oxford. They were married from 1953 until 1974 and had four children, including writer and comedian Arabella Weir. In 1976, Weir married Hilary Reid, with whom he had two children. He died in London on 22 June 2006.

== Honours ==
Weir was appointed CMG in 1974 and KCMG in 1980.

Diplomatic posts
Preceded by Sir Willie Morris	British Ambassador to Egypt; 1979 – 1985	Succeeded by Sir Alan Urwick
