= Dufferin Report =

British plan for Egypt's veiled protectorate

The Dufferin Report issued on 6 February 1883 was the result of Lord Dufferin being sent by Prime Minister William Ewart Gladstone to assess the situation of the Egyptian government after the defeat of the 'Urabi Revolt. The report suggested reforming the Egyptian government to preserve British influence, establish a 'veiled protectorate' and ensure that Britain was the sole western influencer in Egypt.

== Background ==
In 1875 due to the deteriorating economic situation in Egypt (the Khedive was £100 million in debt) Isma'il Pasha was forced to sell his 44% share of the Suez Canal Company to the British government under Prime Minister Benjamin Disraeli for the fee of £4 million. Disraeli had quickly received consent from Parliament and Queen Victoria after being granted a loan from Lionel de Rothschild to secure the shares.

Facing repayment issues in 1876 Isma'il was forced to submit to Anglo-French Dual Control of Egypt's finances. The international commission set up was intended to bring stability to the nation and empower the Khedive. The intention of Dual Control In Egypt was not to seize territory or integrate it into their respective empires; they had hoped to oversee the situation without a territorial occupation.

This plan was thwarted when an anti-western nationalist uprising led by Ahmed 'Urabi sprung up in 1880 and seized power from the new Tewfik Pasha in 1881. Following an anti-European riot in 1882 killing 50 Europeans, and fearing a secret deal between France and 'Urabi, Britain was forced to intervene to protect their interests in the Suez Canal.

Britain invaded with an expeditionary force of around 40,000 led by General Wolseley in September 1882, defeating 'Urabi at the Battle of Tell El Kebir. The subsequent occupation of Egypt was against Liberal policy of Gladstone's government in London, hence Dufferin was sent to report on the situation in Egypt. Gladstone had hoped he could withdraw from Egypt as he had done in the Transvaal once the situation was safe, and restore the pre-'Urabi status quo.

== The Report ==
The report did not suggest what Gladstone wanted; his hopes to re-establish dual control in Egypt were shattered. Dufferin acknowledged that the occupation had been beneficial to Egypt and suggested there was a distinct need to develop the nation to restore economic order to Egypt. The report stated that interests of the Suez Canal Zone should always be paramount in the governance of Egypt. Dufferin's suggestion on the direction of governance was vague. He rejected direct rule like a colony and indirect rule through a British representative like that seen in the Princely States in India. His suggestion was that a balanced approach was necessary, he concluded that ' The Valley of the Nile could not be administered from London as it would arouse the permanent hatred and suspicion of the Egyptians'. His suggestion was that British rule must appear to helping the Egyptians in their own self-governance. It was from this he suggested that over time more Egyptians should be steadily re-included in government.

Another shock to Gladstone was Dufferin's statement about the need to abandon dual control, as the relationship with the French was unworkable and the necessary reforms and development must be introduced by a sole ruler, and that would be Britain. Accompanied with this was more bad news for Gladstone's Liberal foreign policy of anti-imperialism. Dufferin explained that to fix the issues in Egypt a British presence in government was needed for 5 years, and military occupation would need a longer presence. Gladstone was unable to pull out of Egypt as he had hoped.

== Aftermath ==
The report shaped the eventual form that rule over Egypt would take. Evelyn Baring, 1st Earl of Cromer, was sent to Egypt as Consul-General later in 1883 and upon arrival he concluded in alliance with Dufferin's views that a long term British presence was necessary to prevent chaos.

Reforms in Egypt largely followed Dufferin's report, the Granville Doctrine (named after the Foreign Secretary Granville Leveson-Gower, 2nd Earl Granville) was adopted to ensure British dominance of government was maintained during the occupation. The doctrine allowed for any Egyptian minister to be dismissed if they did not comply with British policy.

A Legislative Council and General Assembly was set up to develop Egyptian politics and westernise their system of government.

Contrary to Dufferin's suggestion of including Egyptians in government, over the years of occupation the numbers of Britons in government increased, by 1905 there were around 1,000 British officials in office. This Increased British commitment to Egypt and the idea of a 5-year occupation was not administratively possible.
