= Charles John Barnett =

British Army officer and diplomat

Consul, Warsaw, Poland
- In office 31 May 1833 – c. 1840/1841

Consul-General, Egypt
- In office 11 May 1841 – 17 August 1846
- Nominated by: Queen Victoria
- Preceded by: George Lloyd Hodges
- Succeeded by: Charles Augustus Murray

Personal details
- Born: 13 February 1790 London, England
- Died: 4 August 1856 (aged 76) Englefield Green, Surrey

Military service
- Allegiance: United Kingdom
- Branch/service: British Army
- Rank: Lieutenant Colonel
- Unit: 3rd Regiment of Foot
- Battles/wars: War of the Seventh Coalition; Battle of Waterloo

Charles John Barnett (13 February 1790 – 4 August 1856) was an officer in the British Army who also served as a diplomat.

Barnett was born in London on 13 February 1790 to Benjamin and Alice Barnett. He was baptised 12 March.

He served in the 3rd Regiment of Foot. He reached the rank of captain in 1812 and lieutenant colonel in 1821. He took part in the Battle of Waterloo in 1815, and retired from the military in 1830.

He was appointed Consul in Warsaw, Poland on 31 May 1833. He was later appointed Consul-General in Egypt on 11 May 1841, which post he held till 17 August 1846, when he retired. He died on 4 August 1856 in Englefield Green, Surrey.

Diplomatic posts
Preceded by George Lloyd Hodges	British Consul-General in Egypt; 1841–1846	Succeeded by Charles Murray
