= Willie Morris (diplomat) =

British diplomat (1919-82)

Sir Willie Morris KCMG

British Ambassador to Egypt
- In office 1968–1972
- Preceded by: Horace Phillip
- Succeeded by: Alan Rothnie

British Ambassador to Ethiopia
- In office 1972–1975
- Preceded by: Alan Campbell
- Succeeded by: Derek Day

British Ambassador to Saudi Arabia
- In office 1975–1979
- Preceded by: Philip Adams
- Succeeded by: Michael Scott Weir

Personal details
- Born: 1919
- Died: 13 April 1982 (aged 62–63) Oxford, Oxfordshire, England, UK
- Spouse: Ghislaine Margaret Morris (née Trammell)
- Children: 3

Sir Willie Morris KCMG (1919 – 13 April 1982) was a British diplomat from Yorkshire. He joined the Foreign Office in 1947 and retired in 1979.

== Career ==
His first overseas assignment took him to Cairo in 1948 as a second secretary. He advanced to first secretary in the Foreign Office in 1951. From 1955 to 1960, he was first secretary in the British Embassy in Washington, D.C. There he met his wife, Ghislaine Margaret Trammell. He spent most of his career in the Middle East, and served as the UK ambassador to Saudi Arabia (1968–1972), Ethiopia (1972–1975) and Egypt (1975–1979).

Morris insisted on the importance of strong ties between the United States and the Arab World, and called on Israel to recognize a Palestinian state in the West Bank. A resident of Oxford, he died there, aged 63, after a brief illness. He was survived by his wife, three sons, four siblings, and extended family.

== Honours ==
Morris was appointed a Companion of the Order of St Michael & St George (CMG) in the 1963 Birthday Honours and promoted to Knight Commander of the Order (KCMG) in the 1977 Birthday Honours.

Morris was appointed a Commander (Brother) of the Order of St John in 1980.

Diplomatic posts
Preceded by Sir Horace Phillips	British Ambassador to Saudi Arabia; 1968–1972	Succeeded by Sir Alan Rothnie
Preceded by Sir Alan Campbell	British Ambassador to Ethiopia; 1972–1975	Succeeded by Sir Derek Day
Preceded by Sir Philip Adams	British Ambassador to Egypt; 1975–1979	Succeeded by Sir Michael Weir
