= Eldon Gorst =

British barrister and diplomat and Consul-General in Egypt (1861-1911)

Sir Eldon Gorst GCMG KCB
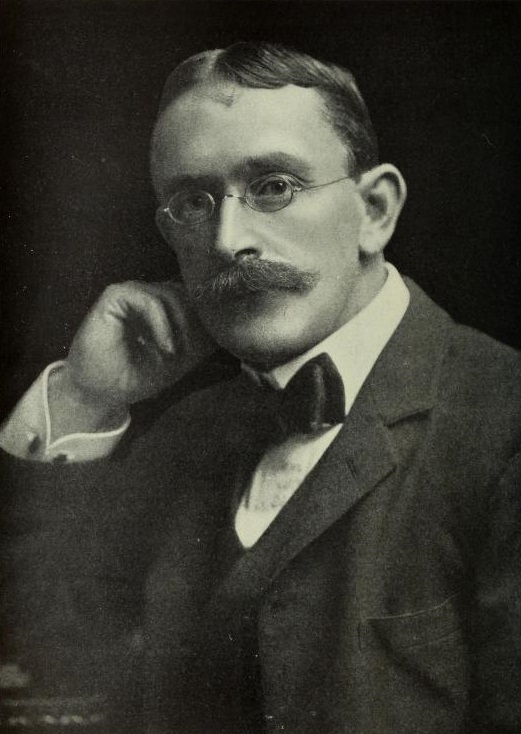

Consul-General in Egypt
- In office 16 May 1907 – 12 July 1911
- Monarch: Abbas II
- Preceded by: Lord Cromer
- Succeeded by: The Viscount Kitchener

Personal details
- Born: John Eldon Gorst; 25 June 1861 New Zealand
- Died: 12 July 1911 (aged 50)
- Party: Liberal Party
- Education: Trinity College, Cambridge
- Profession: Lawyer, Diplomat

Sir John Eldon Gorst GCMG KCB (born John Lowndes Gorst; 25 June 1861 – 12 July 1911) was a British diplomat and colonial administrator. He was British Consul-General in Egypt from 1907 to 1911.

== Career ==
Gorst was the son of Sir John Eldon Gorst, Solicitor General for England and Wales and Vice-President of the Committee of the Council on Education. Born in New Zealand but raised in London, Gorst attended Eton College and Trinity College, Cambridge.

In 1885 he became both a barrister and a member of the British diplomatic corps, going to Egypt the following year as controller of direct taxes, becoming undersecretary for finance in 1892, adviser to the Egyptian Interior Ministry in 1894, and Financial adviser to the Egyptian government in 1898. He was promoted to a Knight Commander of the Order of the Bath (KCB) in the 1902 Coronation Honours list published on 26 June 1902, and received the order and knighthood on 22 September 1902, during a visit to King Edward VII at Balmoral Castle. He was back in Egypt in time to receive Lord Kitchener during a short visit in late October 1902, when Kitchener was en route to take up the appointment as Commander-in-Chief, India. In 1904 Gorst returned to London where, as undersecretary of state, he effectively represented Lord Cromer in the Foreign Office.

After the Liberal Party came to power, the British government sent Gorst to replace Cromer with instructions to give Egyptians greater responsibility to manage their internal affairs. As British Agent and Consul General in Egypt, Gorst quickly improved the Agency's relationship with Khedive Abbas Hilmi II, brought more Egyptians into responsible government positions, and weakened the Egyptian National Party. However, his efforts to rein in the burgeoning corps of Anglo-Egyptian officials offended many old Egypt hands. The appointment of Boutros Ghali as prime minister, popularly ascribed to Gorst, angered the Nationalists and many other Egyptians, leading to press attacks and eventually to Boutros Ghali's assassination. The revival of the Press Law in 1909 alienated Europeans as well as Egyptians and proved unenforceable. Gorst's attempt to extend the Suez Canal Company's concession in 1909–1910 to raise additional funds for development in Egypt and the Sudan was disliked by all Egyptians; when he put the issue to the Egyptian General Assembly, vehement opposition from the Nationalist press led to its rejection.

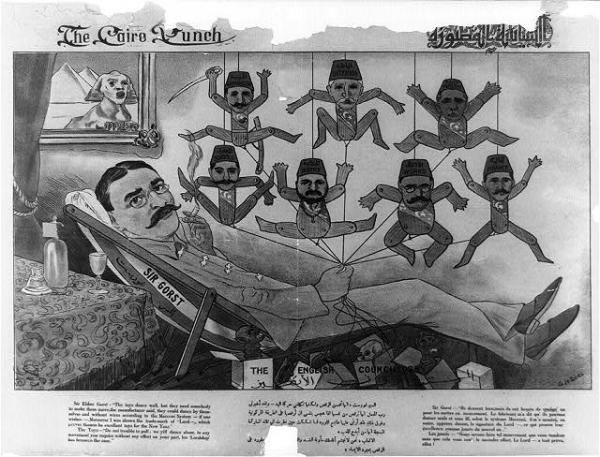
Political cartoon published in the Cairo Punch, showing Sir Eldon Gorst, reclining and holding strings attached to puppets representing Egyptian ministers

This rejection, together with the murder of Boutros Ghali, caused Gorst to abandon his lenient policy in favor of a harsher one, using the Exceptional Laws and various penal measures to stifle the Nationalists. He had almost restored British control when he became stricken with cancer and went back to England to die.

An unprepossessing and egotistical man, disliked by the older British colonial administrators in Egypt and distrusted by the Egyptians as sphinxlike, Gorst was never accorded the respect that his intelligence and strong will warranted, although he received the Grand Cordons of the Osmanieh and Mejidiye Orders and was a Knight Commander of Sts. Michael and George. His autobiographical notes and diaries are at St Antony's College, Oxford and other papers are in the possession of his grandson, Paul Lysley.

Eldon Gorst was also the lover for two years in the 1880s of (Christina Anne) Jessica Sykes, née Cavendish-Bentinck, whose son Sir Mark Sykes, 6th Bt., later married 1903 Eldon's younger sister Edith.

== Works ==
- "Lord Cromer in Egypt" . The Empire and the century. London: John Murray. 1905. pp. 760–772.

Diplomatic posts
Preceded by Evelyn Baring, 1st Earl of Cromer	British Agent and Consul-General in Egypt; 1907–1911	Succeeded by Herbert Kitchener, 1st Earl Kitchener
