= Paul Arkwright =

British diplomat

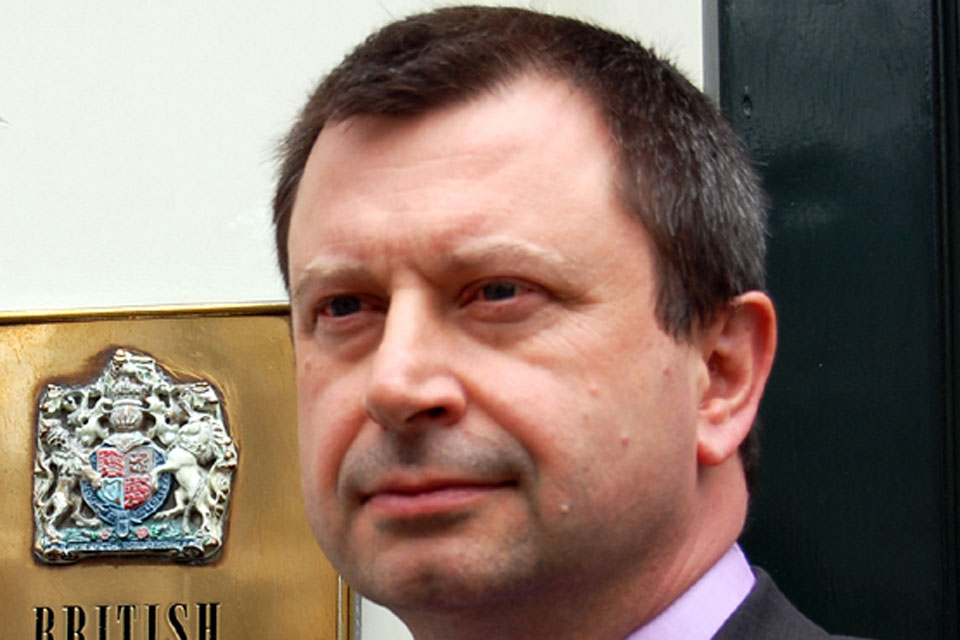
Paul Arkwright

Paul Thomas Arkwright CMG (born 2 March 1962) is a British diplomat who was High Commissioner to the Federal Republic of Nigeria 2015–18.

== Early life ==
Arkwright was born in Bolton, and grew up in Lancashire. He is the son of Thomas Arkwright and Muriel Hague. He grew up in Bolton.

He attended the independent school Ampleforth College. He gained a BA in English in 1983 from Trinity College, Cambridge.

== Career ==
Arkwright joined the Foreign and Commonwealth Office (FCO) in 1987. He was based in West Berlin (British Military Government near the Olympiastadion) from 1988–1991, seeing the overthrow of the Berlin Wall at first hand. From 1993–1997 he was a First Secretary to the UK Mission to the UN. From 1997–1998 he worked at the Ministry of Foreign Affairs of France; this led to him being a First Secretary from 1998–2001 at Paris. From 2001–2005 he was part of the UK Delegation to NATO in Brussels.

From 2006–2009 he achieved a senior post in the FCO, becoming Head of the Counter-Proliferation Department (CPD).

=== Ambassador ===
Arkwright was British Ambassador to the Kingdom of the Netherlands 2009–2013. He was Director, Multilateral Policy at the FCO 2013–2015, and was then appointed High Commissioner to the Federal Republic of Nigeria, taking up his post at Abuja in October 2015. He was replaced in November 2018 to transfer to another Diplomatic Service appointment.

He was appointed Companion of the Order of St Michael and St George (CMG) in the 2016 Birthday Honours for services to foreign policy.

== Personal life ==
Arkwright married Patricia Holland in 1997 in Paris, and they have a son and daughter. He follows Bolton Wanderers F.C.

Diplomatic posts
Preceded by Lyn Parker	British Ambassador to the Netherlands; 2009–2013	Succeeded by Geoffrey Adams
Preceded by Sir Andrew Pocock	British High Commissioner to Nigeria; 2015–2018	Succeeded by Catriona Laing
