= Geoffrey Adams =

British diplomat (born 1957)

Sir Geoffrey Adams KCMG
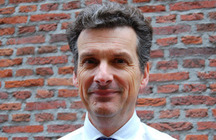
- Adams in 2013

British Ambassador to Egypt
- In office 2018–2021
- Monarch: Elizabeth II
- Prime Minister: Theresa May; Boris Johnson
- Preceded by: John Casson
- Succeeded by: Gareth Bayley

British Ambassador to the Netherlands
- In office 2013–2017
- Monarch: Elizabeth II
- Prime Minister: David Cameron; Theresa May
- Preceded by: Paul Arkwright
- Succeeded by: Peter Wilson

British Ambassador to Iran
- In office 2006–2009
- Monarch: Elizabeth II
- Prime Minister: Tony Blair; Gordon Brown
- Preceded by: Sir Richard Dalton
- Succeeded by: Sir Simon Gass

Personal details
- Born: Geoffrey Doyne Adams; 11 June 1957 (age 69)
- Education: Eton College
- Alma mater: Magdalen College, Oxford

Sir Geoffrey Doyne Adams (born 11 June 1957) served as the British Ambassador to Egypt from 2018 to 2021, as a member of the British Diplomatic Service. He was Ambassador to the Netherlands from 2013 to 2017.

== Biography ==
Adams was educated at Eton College, where he was a King's Scholar, and Magdalen College, Oxford, where he studied Islamic history and Middle Eastern politics. In 1979, he joined the British Diplomatic Service. Adams has been in diplomatic postings overseas in Saudi Arabia, France, South Africa and Egypt. He was the British Consul-General in Jerusalem from 2001 to 2003, responsible for Britain's relations with the Palestinian people, before joining Jack Straw's private office as Principal Private Secretary to the Foreign Secretary. He served as Ambassador to Iran 2006–09 and Director-General, Political at the Foreign and Commonwealth Office (FCO) 2009–12.

In September 2013 he took up the post of Ambassador to the Netherlands, and concurrently Permanent Representative to the Organisation for the Prohibition of Chemical Weapons which is based in The Hague. In January 2017 the FCO announced that he was to transfer to another Diplomatic Service appointment. He left Belgium in August 2012. He was subsequently appointed as the British ambassador to Egypt.

Adams is honorary senior lecturer at the Institute for Iranian Studies at St Andrews University.

== Honours ==
Adams was appointed a Companion of the Order of St Michael and St George (CMG) in the 2003 New Year Honours, and promoted to Knight Commander of the same Order (KCMG) in the 2008 Birthday Honours.

He is furthermore a Member (formerly Serving Brother) of the Venerable Order of Saint John (MStJ) since 2006.

== Offices held ==
Diplomatic posts
Preceded by Robin Kealy	British Consul-General, Jerusalem; 2001–2003	Succeeded by John Jenkins
Preceded by Simon McDonald	Principal Private Secretary to the Foreign Secretary; 2003–2005	Succeeded by Peter Hayes
Preceded by Sir Richard Dalton	Ambassador to Iran; 2006–2009	Succeeded by Sir Simon Gass
Preceded by Mark Lyall Grant	Director-General, Political, Foreign and Commonwealth Office; 2009–2013	Succeeded by Mark Sedwill
Preceded by Paul Arkwright	Ambassador to the Netherlands; 2013–2017	Succeeded by Peter Wilson
Preceded by John Casson	Ambassador to Egypt; 2018-2021	Succeeded by Gareth Bayley
