= John Barker (diplomat) =

English diplomat and horticulturist

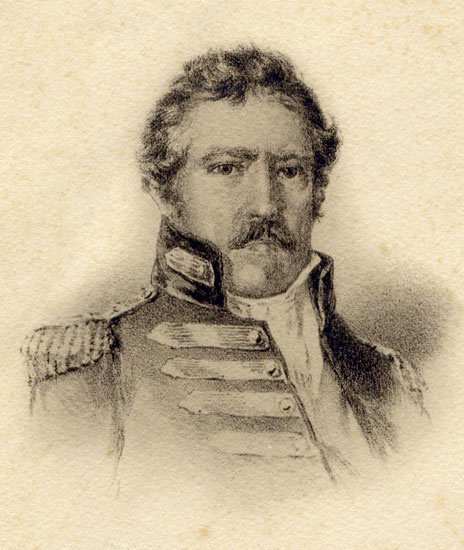

Consul of the Levant Company in Aleppo
- In office 1799–1825
- Monarchs: George III; George IV
- Preceded by: Robert Abbott
- Succeeded by: Nathaniel William Worry

British Consul in Alexandria
- In office 1826–1829
- Monarch: George IV
- Preceded by: Peter Lee
- Succeeded by: ?

British Consul-General in Egypt
- In office 1829–1833
- Monarchs: George IV; William IV
- Preceded by: Henry Salt
- Succeeded by: Patrick Campbell

Personal details
- Born: 9 March 1771 Smyrna, Ottoman Empire
- Died: 5 October 1849 (aged 78) Suedia, Ottoman Syria
- Spouse: Marianne Hays
- Children: Three sons Two daughters
- Occupation: Horticulturist
- Profession: Diplomat

John Barker (9 March 1771 – 5 October 1849) was an English diplomat and horticulturist.

== Diplomatic career ==
Born in Smyrna (present-day İzmir) on 9 March 1771, Barker was educated in England. In 1797, he went to Constantinople where he became private secretary to Sir John Spencer Smith, the British ambassador to the Ottoman Empire.

Barker was Consul of the Levant Company in Aleppo maybe as early as 1799, but certainly from 1803. He seems to have remained in post until 1825, not least because there is no evidence of a replacement. He had an annual salary of £1,200, the equivalent of £118,507 in present-day terms. He had to flee from Aleppo in 1807 due to the rupture between the United Kingdom and the Ottoman Empire. He remained in hiding and rendered important services to the East India Company. He returned to Aleppo after the signing of the 1809 peace treaty between the two countries. Barker stayed in Aleppo until 1825. Upon his departure, the Aleppo consulship remained vacant for nearly a decade, until Nathaniel William Werry was appointed to the post in 1835.

On 28 June 1826, Barker was appointed British consul in Alexandria, Egypt. Following the death of Henry Salt in 1827, Barker acted as consul-general in Egypt. He was formally appointed to the position on 30 June 1829. Barker proved himself unreliable during the first stages of the crisis between Western powers and Muhammad Ali Pasha, the viceroy of Egypt who was pursuing an expansionist policy at that time. As a result, British Foreign Secretary Lord Palmerston replaced him as consul with a commissioned officer, Colonel Patrick Campbell. Barker retired in 1833. In the same year, his collection of antiquities was sold anonymously by Sotheby's. Barker had been a fervent collector of antiquities, and his collection comprised 258 lots. The British Museum and John Lee were the principal buyers.

== Interest in horticulture ==
Barker spent his retirement years in Suedia (ancient Seleucia Pieria), on the banks of the Orontes River, near the city of Antioch. He built a spacious house for himself in Suedia, and planted fruit trees. The native inhabitants, both Muslim and Christian, loved and respected him and his family. Barker was especially interested in the peach, the nectarine and the apricot. For many years, he sent agents as far away as Bukhara, Samarkand and Kandahar to get him scions of the best fruit-producing trees. Thanks to his botanical garden, he introduced many oriental plants and trees to England and Western plants and trees to Syria. The famous "Stanwick nectarine" was introduced by Barker to the United Kingdom through the assistance of the Duke of Northumberland.

Barker helped improve the culture of cotton and silk in Syria. He also introduced vaccination to the Middle East. When an outbreak of cholera occurred in the north of Syria in 1848, a remedy was discovered by which many persons were cured even in the advanced stages of the disease. Barker verified the efficiency of the remedy by personal observation, and once he was satisfied with the result, he went to great lengths to spread the knowledge of what he deemed an important discovery to the whole world. Despite the fact that he was officially retired, Barker did not totally disengage himself from active politics and public life. During the 1835 Euphrates expedition, for instance, he forwarded the objects of the expedition and received with considerable hospitality Colonel Chesney and his men.

== Family ==
Barker's family came from the small market town of Bakewell in Derbyshire, England. His father was William Barker, merchant, a Member of the Levant Company, based in Smyrna. On 15 June 1800, Barker married Marianne Hays, the only surviving child of David Hays, a former consul in Aleppo. Marianne's stepfather Robert Abbott—her mother's second husband—had succeeded her father as consul in Aleppo. Following his death in 1797, Marianne's mother had carried on the consular business during two years, until Barker arrived as consul in 1799. Barker and his wife Marianne had three sons and two daughters, all of whom possessed a great facility for acquiring languages, and became proficient Orientalists. The most famous of Barker's five children was his son William Burckhardt (c. 1810 – 1856), who was born in Aleppo during his father's consulship.

Diplomatic posts
Vacant Title last held by Robert Abbott	Consul of the Levant Company in Aleppo; 1799–1825	Vacant Title next held by Nathaniel William Worry
Preceded by Peter Lee	British Consul in Alexandria; 1826–1829	Vacant Title next held by Robert Thurburn
Preceded by Henry Salt	British Consul-General in Egypt; 1829–1833	Succeeded by Patrick Campbell
