= James Adams (diplomat) =

British diplomat (1932–2020)

Sir William James Adams KCMG
- Born: 30 April 1932
- Died: 24 April 2020 (aged 87)
- Occupation: Diplomat
- Spouse: Donatella Adams (1961-2020) (Donatella Adams died 2023)
- Children: 3

Sir William James Adams KCMG (30 April 1932 – 24 April 2020) was a British diplomat.

Born in Wolverhampton, England, he was educated at Wolverhampton Grammar School and Shrewsbury School. He served as the United Kingdom's ambassador to Tunisia (1984–1987) and Egypt (1987–1992).

He died on 24 April 2020, outlived by his wife, Donatella Adams (1940-2023), an Italian-born woman, who died three years later in 2023. They married in 1961.

Diplomatic posts
Preceded by Sir Alexander Stirling	British Ambassador to Tunisia; 1984 – 1987	Succeeded by Stephen Peter Day
Preceded by Sir Alan Urwick	British Ambassador to Egypt; 1987 – 1992	Succeeded by Christopher Long
