= David Blatherwick (diplomat) =

Retired British diplomat

Sir David Blatherwick KCMG OBE

British Ambassador to Ireland
- In office 1991–1995
- Preceded by: Sir Nicholas Fenn
- Succeeded by: Veronica Sutherland

British Ambassador to Egypt
- In office 1999–1999
- Preceded by: Christopher William Long
- Succeeded by: Sir Graham Boyce

Sir David Elliott Spiby Blatherwick, KCMG OBE (born 13 July 1941), is a British retired diplomat. After joining the Foreign Office in 1964 he served in a number of diplomatic posts in Kuwait, Ireland, Egypt and at the United Nations in New York. He was appointed the British ambassador to Ireland from 1991 to 1995, and ambassador to Egypt from 1995 to 1999. Following his retirement he has served on the boards of a number of organisations.

== Education and career ==
Born on 13 July 1941, he was educated at Lincoln School and Wadham College, Oxford and joined the Foreign Office in 1964. He attended the Middle East Centre for Arabic Studies from 1964 to 1966. Between 1966 and 1968 he became a Third then later a Second Secretary at the Foreign Office before being appointed to the diplomatic service in 1968. His first overseas posting was Kuwait from 1968 followed by Dublin in 1970. He was promoted to First Secretary and returned to work at the Foreign Office from September 1973. In July 1977 he was appointed Head of Chancery in Cairo.

He was promoted to counsellor and from March 1981 to 1983 he was seconded to the Political Affairs Division of the Northern Ireland Office. Following criticism of the British government by Cardinal Tomás Ó Fiaich after the death of hunger strikers Raymond McCreesh and Patsy O'Hara in May 1981, Blatherwick advised the Prime Minister, Margaret Thatcher, on a possible response to the Cardinal. Documents related to the hunger strike, including Blatherwick's advice note, were released by the British Government in 2012 and published on the Conflict Archive on the Internet website.

During his time in Northern Ireland he met with the Ulster Unionist politician, David Trimble. Blatherwick described Trimble as initially suspicious of the motives of both the Northern Ireland Office and the Foreign Office, who he saw as pandering to the nationalists. However Trimble later came to the view that Blatherwick was not planning to sell out Ulster but was instead "looking for some formulation that would quieten things down."

In March 1983 he became Head of the Energy Science and Space Department at the Foreign Office. He was appointed counsellor and Head of Chancery at the UK mission to the United Nations in New York and served there from June 1986 to 1989. He returned to the Foreign Office again in 1989, this time as Superintending Under-Secretary and Principal Finance Officer with responsibility for planning and co-ordination of expenditure and oversight of delegated budgets.

He served as ambassador to Ireland from 10 September 1991 to 29 March 1995, and ambassador to Egypt from May 1995 to 10 February 1999. He retired from the diplomatic service in 1999.

== After retirement ==
Following his retirement he took up a number of board positions. He was a director of the British Egyptian Society from 20 July 1999 to 17 April 2005 and the Middle East Association from 3 May 2000 to 1 September 2006. His knowledge of Irish affairs led to his appointment in January 2003 as the British Joint Chairman of Anglo-Irish Encounter, a non-governmental organisation established in 1983 which is mainly concerned with cultural and social issues between the two countries. He was a trustee of the British Egyptian Foundation for Children with Special Needs charity before it was disbanded in July 2011.

Blatherwick became Chairman of the Egyptian-British Chamber of Commerce in December 1999, a position he still holds as of September 2012. He has been a trustee of the British University in Egypt since it opened in 2005 and still continues in this role as of the 2011 to 2012 academic year. He had been involved with the initial proposals for the new university during his time as ambassador to Egypt in 1998.

In April 2004 Blatherwick was one of 52 former British diplomats to sign a letter criticising Tony Blair for his policies on the Middle East. A week later several of the signatories, including Blatherwick, were criticised by The Sunday Telegraph for not disclosing their business links to the region. On 15 September 2010, Blatherwick, along with 54 other public figures, signed an open letter published in The Guardian, stating their opposition to Pope Benedict XVI's state visit to the UK.

== Honours ==
He was made an Officer of the Order of the British Empire in 1973, a Companion of the Order of St Michael and St George in 1990 and a Knight Commander of the Order of St Michael and St George in 1997.

== Personal life ==
He married Margaret Clare Crompton in 1964. Blatherwick is a patron of Humanists UK.

== Works ==
- Blatherwick, David E.S. (1987). The international politics of telecommunications. Research series (University of California, Berkeley. Institute of International Studies). Vol. 68. University of California, Berkeley. ISBN 9780877251682.

Diplomatic posts
Preceded by Nicholas Fenn	British Ambassador to Ireland; 1991–1995	Succeeded by Veronica Sutherland
Preceded by Christopher William Long	British Ambassador to Egypt; 1995–1999	Succeeded by Graham Boyce
