= Patrick Campbell (British Army officer, born 1779) =

Scottish army officer and diplomat (1779–1857)

Colonel Patrick Campbell
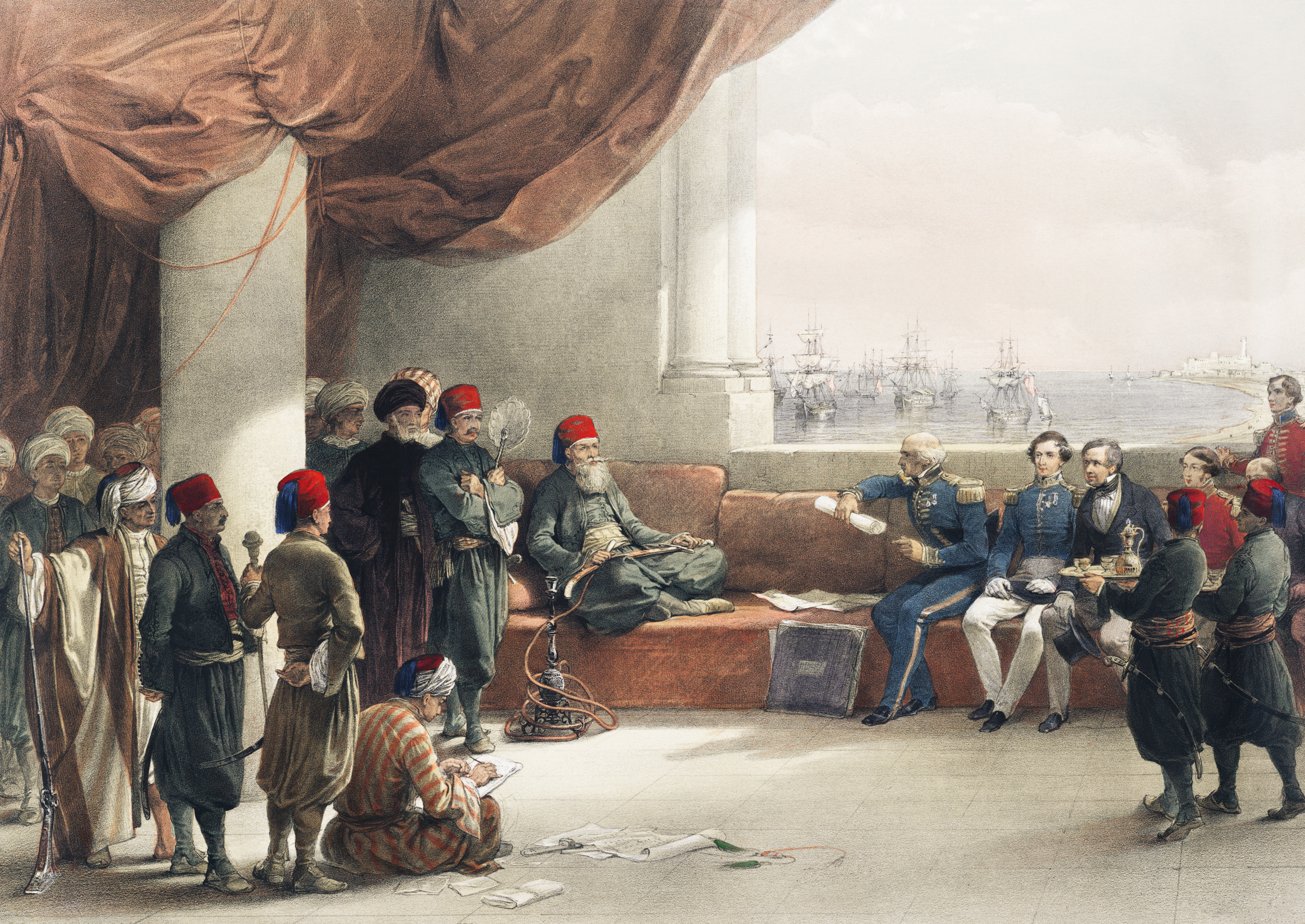
- Campbell (centre) meeting Muhammad Ali of Egypt (left) in 1839. Witnessed and depicted by David Roberts
- Born: 17 December 1779; Duntroon, Scotland
- Died: 29 August 1857 (aged 77); Southampton, England
- Military career
- Allegiance: United Kingdom
- Branch: British Army
- Service years: 1795–1836
- Rank: Colonel (Britain); Lieutenant-Colonel (Spain)
- Conflicts: French Revolutionary Wars; West Indies Campaign; Second Carib War; Napoleonic Wars; Peninsular War; Battle of Talavera
- Awards: Order of Charles III, Laureate Cross of Saint Ferdinand
- Other work: Secretary of Legation, Colombia (1826); Agent and Consul-General, Egypt (1833)

Colonel Patrick Campbell (17 December 1779 – 29 August 1857) was a Scottish army officer and diplomat born in Duntrune.

Patrick Campbell was born into a military family. His father was Neil Campbell (1736–1791), and his two older brothers were James Campbell (1773–1799) and Neil Campbell (1776–1827), all of whom served in the military. Patrick Campbell's service started under Ralph Abercromby in the West Indies. In 1800, he became brigade major to the Royal Artillery in Gibraltar. In 1809, he volunteered to serve with the Spanish Army in the Peninsular War, and took part in several battles, notably the Battle of Talavera. In 1811, he raised and commanded a Spanish Light Infantry Regiment, and in 1813–14 he commanded a Spanish Brigade in the field and was promoted lieutenant colonel and awarded the Order of Charles III as well as the Laureate Cross of Saint Ferdinand. However, he ended his military career in 1823, and entered the Diplomatic Service. He was appointed Secretary of Legation in Colombia on the 29 December in 1826, and then Agent and Consul-General in Egypt on the 7 January in 1833. He retired on the 13 August in 1841. "Campbell's Chamber" in the Great Pyramid of Giza was named in his honour by its discoverer Howard Vyse. He died on 29 August 1857, aged 77, at Rockstone Place, Southampton.

== Bibliography ==
- Campbell of Airds, Alastair (2004). A history of Clan Campbell: From the Restoration to the present day. Vol. 3. The Clan Campbell Education Foundation (1st ed.). Edinburgh: Edinburgh University Press. pp. 203–204, 228. ISBN 978-0-7486-1790-6. OCLC 59279320.

Diplomatic posts
Preceded by John Barker	British Consul-General in Egypt; 1833–1839	Succeeded by George Lloyd Hodges
