= William Burckhardt Barker =

English orientalist

William Burckhardt Barker (1810?–1856) was an English orientalist.

== Life ==
Barker was born about 1810, at which time John Barker, his father, was consul at Aleppo. From both his parents he inherited a singular linguistic aptitude. He was the godson of John Louis Burckhardt, who, about the time of his birth, was for several months the guest of his father. He was brought to England in 1819, and educated there. From his early boyhood he prosecuted the study of oriental languages, and became at length as familiar with Arabic, Turkish, and Persian as he was with the chief languages of Europe. After his return to Syria Barker undertook a journey to the scarcely known sources of the Orontes River, no account of which, until the communication of his 'Notes' to the Geographical Society of London in 1836, had ever been published.

Barker returned on 22 August 1835, to his father's residence at Suediah, near the mouth of the Orontes, and during part of the succeeding winter played chess almost every evening with Ibrahim Pasha, then governor of Syria and resident at Antioch. Barker was for 'many years resident at Tarsus in an official capacity'—in the list of members of the Syro-Egyptian Society of London for 1847–8 he is designated, probably by mistake, as 'H.B.M. Consul, Tarsus'.

Barker was for some time professor of the Arabic, Turkish, Persian, and Hindustani languages at Eton College, and he dedicated his Turkish grammar to Dr. Hawtrey, the provost. In the course of the Crimean War Barker placed his knowledge of the oriental languages and character at the disposal of the British government, in whose service he died on 28 January 1856, 'of cholera, at Sinope, on the Black Sea, aged 45', whilst employed as chief superintendent of the land transport depôt at that place.

== Works ==
He accumulated materials for his major work Lares and Penates (1853), which was edited by William Francis Ainsworth. Before this Barker had produced a polyglot volume entitled 'Exhibition of the Works of Industry of all Nations. The Speech of His Royal Highness Prince Albert translated into the principal European and Oriental Languages,’ London, 1851. Other works were:

- 'Turkish Tales in English;’
- 'A Practical Grammar of the Turkish Language; with Dialogues and Vocabulary,’ London, 1854;
- 'A Reading Book of the Turkish Language, with Grammar and Vocabulary,’ London, 1854;
- 'Baitál Pachísí; or, Twenty-five Tales of a Demon; a new edition of the Hindí Text, with each Word expressed in the Hindústání Character immediately under the corresponding word in Nágarí, and with a perfectly literal English interlinear translation, accompanied by a free translation in English at the foot of each page, and explanatory notes,’ Hertford, 1855. This work was edited by Edward Backhouse Eastwick, to whom it was dedicated.
- 'Odessa and its Inhabitants, by an English Prisoner in Russia,’ London, 1855;
- 'A short Historical Account of the Crimea, from the Earliest Ages and during the Russian Occupation,’ Hertford and London, the Preface of which is dated from 'Constantinople, 12 March 1855.'
