= Alan Urwick =

British diplomat and Serjeant-at-Arms

Sir Alan Bedford Urwick KCVO CMG KStJ

Serjeant-at-Arms of the House of Commons
- In office 1989–1995
- Monarch: Elizabeth II
- Preceded by: Sir Victor Le Fanu
- Succeeded by: Sir Peter Jennings

British High Commissioner to Canada
- In office 1987–1989
- Monarch: Elizabeth II
- Preceded by: Sir Derek Day
- Succeeded by: Brian Fall

British Ambassador to Egypt
- In office 1985–1987
- Monarch: Elizabeth II
- Preceded by: Sir Michael Weir
- Succeeded by: Sir James Adams

British Ambassador to Jordan
- In office 1979–1984
- Monarch: Elizabeth II
- Preceded by: John Moberly
- Succeeded by: Sir John Coles

Personal details
- Born: 2 May 1930 London, United Kingdom
- Died: 8 December 2016 (aged 85–86) Slaugham, West Sussex
- Education: New College, Oxford University

Sir Alan Bedford Urwick KCVO CMG KStJ (2 May 1930 – 8 December 2016) was a British diplomat, who served as Serjeant-at-Arms of the House of Commons from 1989 to 1995.

== Early life ==
Alan Bedford Urwick was born on 2 May 1930, in London. He was the younger of the two children, of Lt. Col. Lyndall Fownes Urwick OBE MC and Joan Wilhelmina Saunders (née Bedford).

Lyndall F. Urwick was one of the British pioneers of scientific management prior to the Second World War. In 1934, he set up his own management consultancy practice, Urwick, Orr & Partners.

Alan Urwick was educated at Dragon School in Oxford, and then at Rugby School in Warwickshire.

Alan Urwick graduated from New College, Oxford, obtaining a first in Modern History in 1952.

== Career ==
=== Foreign Office ===
Urwick joined the British diplomatic service in 1952 and undertook tours of duty in Western Europe, the Middle East, Moscow, and Washington, D.C. He served as the United Kingdom's ambassador to Jordan (1979–1984) and to Egypt (1985–1987), and was the British High Commissioner in Canada (1987–1989). He left the diplomatic service in 1989.

=== Serjeant-at-Arms ===
He then served as Serjeant-at-Arms of the House of Commons until his retirement in 1995.

== Retirement and death ==
In retirement, Urwick served as the Chairman of the Anglo-Jordanian Society from 1997 to 2001. He arranged for a memorial service to be held at St. Paul's Cathedral following the death of King Hussein of Jordan in 1999.

Urwick died on 8 December 2016, at the age of 86, at his home in Slaugham, West Sussex.

A memorial service was held at St. Margaret's Church in Westminster Abbey on 19 October 2017.

== Personal life ==
Urwick married Marta Montagne, the daughter of the Peruvian ambassador to Lebanon, in 1960 in Beirut. They had three sons together, Christopher, Richard, and Michael. Urwick spoke fluent French, German, Russian, Spanish, Italian, and Arabic. Urwick was a member of the Garrick Club and an honorary member of the Worshipful Company of Management Consultants.

Diplomatic posts
Preceded by John Moberly	British Ambassador to Jordan; 1979–1984	Succeeded by Sir John Coles
Preceded by Sir Michael Weir	British Ambassador to Egypt; 1985–1987	Succeeded by Sir James Adams
Preceded by Sir Derek Day	British High Commissioner to Canada; 1987–1989	Succeeded by Brian Fall
Parliament of the United Kingdom
Preceded by Sir Victor Le Fanu	Serjeant-at-Arms of the House of Commons; 1989–1995	Succeeded by Sir Peter Jennings
