= John Casson =

British diplomat (born 1971)

John David Casson CMG

British Ambassador to Egypt
- In office August 2014 – August 2018
- Monarch: Elizabeth II
- Preceded by: James Watt
- Succeeded by: Sir Geoffrey Adams

Personal details
- Born: 4 June 1971 (age 54) Birmingham, United Kingdom

John David Casson CMG (born 4 June 1971) is a British diplomat, who served as the British Ambassador to Egypt from August 2014 to August 2018.

== Early life ==
John David Casson was born in Birmingham, United Kingdom on 4 June 1971. Casson was born to Reverend David and Helen Casson.

Casson was educated at Ashcroft High School in Luton, Bedfordshire and Tiffin School, a boys' grammar school in Kingston upon Thames, London. After Tiffin, Casson attended Richmond upon Thames College.

== Career ==
=== Ambassador to Egypt ===
Casson was appointed the British Ambassador to Egypt in August 2014 until August 2018.

In May 2015, Casson faced criticism on Twitter after making a joke referencing a recent Egyptian political controversy.

Casson was the leader of the disability charity L’Arche in the United Kingdom from January 2021 to August 2025.

== Personal life ==
Casson married his wife, Kathryn Rachel Clarke, in 2000. Casson speaks fluent Arabic. Casson identifies as a Christian. He was appointed Companion of the Order of St Michael and St George (CMG) in the 2014 Birthday Honours list.
