= Derek Day =

British diplomat and hockey player

Personal information
- Born: 29 November 1927 Barnet, England
- Died: 7 March 2015 (aged 87) Goudhurst, England

Sport
- Sport: Field hockey
- Position: Goalkeeper
Senior career
Years	Team	Caps	Goals
1951–1953	Southgate	-	-
National team
Years	Team	Caps	Goals
–	Great Britain		-
–	England		-
Medal record
Men's field hockey
Representing Great Britain
Bronze medal – third place	1952 Helsinki	Team competition

Sir Derek Malcolm Day KCMG (29 November 1927 – 7 March 2015) was a British diplomat and field hockey player who competed ta the 1952 Summer Olympics.

== Biography ==
Day was educated at Hurstpierpoint College and studied at St Catharine's College, Cambridge. In between his studies he completed National Service in the Royal Artillery.

He represented Great Britain in the field hockey tournament at the 1952 Olympic Games in Helsinki. winning a bronze medal. Day competed in all of the matches except the bronze medal play off when Graham Dadds was given an opportunity to play.

He played hockey for Southgate Hockey Club at club level and Middlesex at county level.

Day joined the Foreign and Commonwealth Office in 1951 and went on to serve as UK Ambassador to Ethiopia from 1975 to 1978, and UK High Commissioner to Canada from 1984 to 1987. He was made KCMG in 1984, having been made CMG in 1973.

== Honours ==
- Knight Commander of the Order of St Michael and St George (KCMG) - 1984

Diplomatic posts
Preceded by Willie Morris	UK Ambassador to Ethiopia; 1975–1978	Succeeded by Robert Tesh
Preceded by Lord Moran	UK High Commissioner to Canada; 1984–1987	Succeeded by Sir Alan Urwick
