= George Lloyd Hodges =

British soldier and diplomat

Sir George Lloyd Hodges KCB
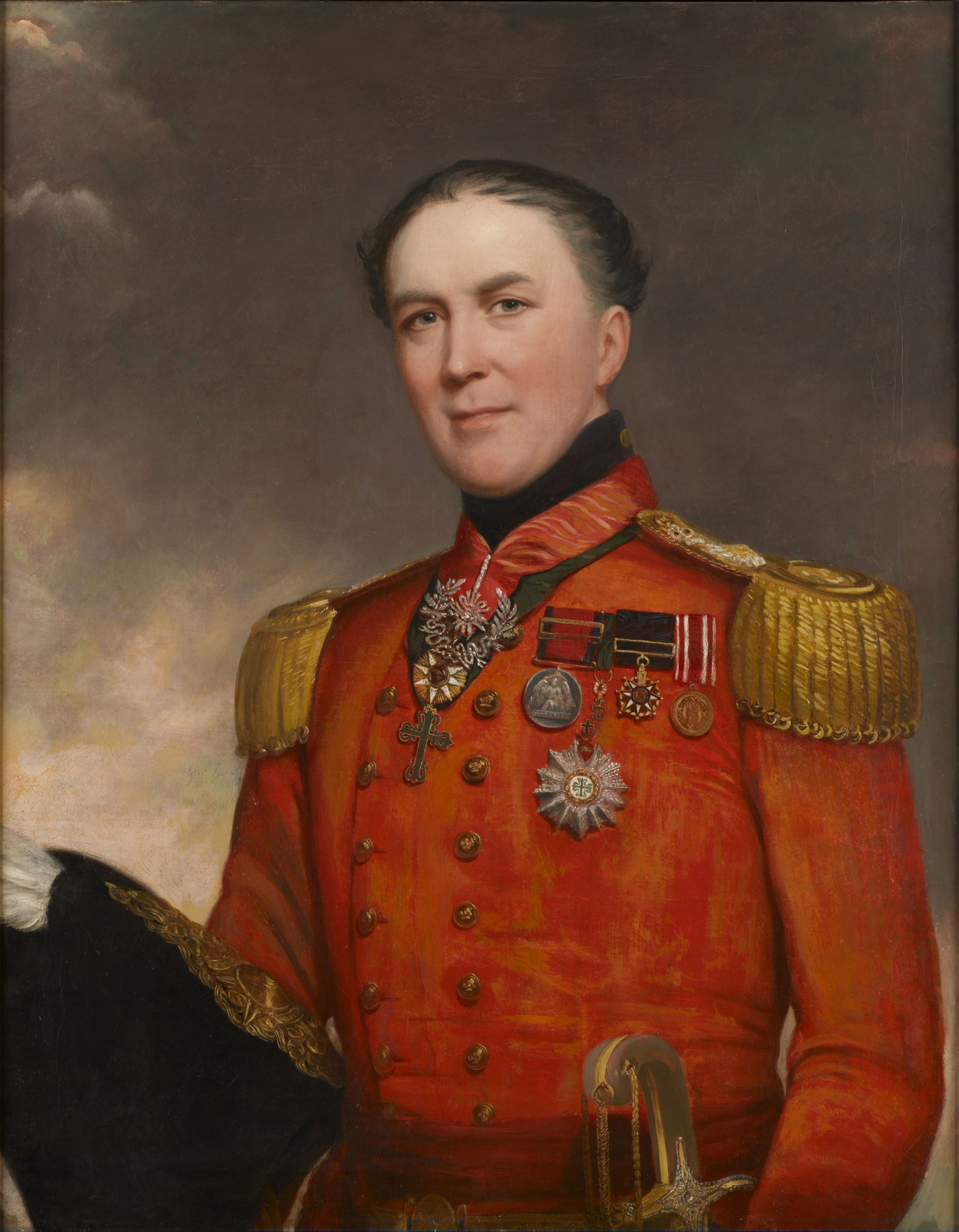
- Portrait of George Lloyd Hodges, c. 1840
- Born: 1792; Old Abbey, County Limerick, Ireland
- Died: 14 December 1862 (aged 69–70); Brighton
- Occupations: Soldier, diplomat
- Known for: British diplomat to Serbia, Egypt, Lower Saxony
- Father: George Thomas Hodges

Sir George Lloyd Hodges KCB (1792 – 14 December 1862) was a British soldier and diplomat.

== Biography ==
He was born at the Old Abbey, County Limerick, Ireland, the eldest son of George Thomas Hodges. He entered the British Army in 1806, and took part in the Battles of Quatre Bras and Waterloo. In 1832 he commanded the brigade of British volunteers who enlisted to fight to restore the rightful Queen of Portugal, Maria da Glória, to her throne against the forces of the usurper, Dom Miguel. With the rest of the forces commanded by Maria's father Dom Pedro, the ex-Emperor of Brazil, they sailed from Terceira in the Azores, captured Porto and endured a siege there of nearly a year. Hodges distinguished himself by his leadership, especially during the assault on the city by Miguel's army on 29 September 1832. He afterwards published a memoir, Narrative of the Expedition to Portugal in 1832, under the orders of His Imperial Majesty Dom Pedro, Duke of Braganza (London, 1833).

Hodges was subsequently knighted and was active in the wars of the Balkans in the late 1830s. He was appointed the first British consul to Serbia on 30 January 1837, and was promoted to the rank of consul-general on 15 December 1837.

Hodges was appointed Consul-General in Egypt on 1 October 1839. On 11 May 1841, he was appointed Consul-General in the Circle of Lower Saxony and for the Free Cities of Hamburg, Bremen, and Lübeck.

Diplomatic posts
First	British Consul-General in Serbia; 1837–1839	Vacant Title next held by Thomas de Grenier de Fonblanque
Preceded by Patrick Campbell	British Consul-General in Egypt; 1839–1841	Succeeded by Charles John Barnett
Preceded by Henry Canning	British Chargé d'Affaires and Consul-General to the Hans Towns; 1841–1860	Succeeded by John Ward
