= Hannibal Evans Lloyd =

Hannibal Evans Lloyd (1771–July 15, 1847) was an English linguist and translator.

== Life ==
Born in London, he was son of Henry Humphrey Evans Lloyd and Mary, sister of the Chevalier de Johnstone. An orphan while still young, he was brought up by relatives. In the spring of 1800 he settled at Hamburg. At a late stage of the Napoleonic Wars, the city was occupied by the French army, Lloyd fought in its defence, and then escaped.

In 1813 Evans received an appointment in the Foreign Office. He retained the post till his death, at Blackheath on 15 July 1847.

== Works ==
Lloyd was a contributor to the Literary Gazette from its founding in 1817, mainly on archæology and the fine arts. A friend of Friedrich Gottlieb Klopstock, Lloyd translated with him most of Der Messias, but did not publish his version. He also knew Christoph Daniel Ebeling well, and wrote his obituary for the Gazette. He reviewed German books for the Foreign Quarterly Review.

Lloyd wrote Italian verse, and maintained a correspondence with travellers and men of science. His original writings were:

- Hamburgh, or a particular account of the Transactions which took place in that City during the first six months of 1813, London, 1813. Written at the suggestion of Lord Bathurst.
- Alexander I, Emperor of Russia, or a Sketch of his Life, London, 1826.
- George IV, Memoirs of his Life and Reign, London, 1830.
- Descriptive and Historical Illustrations, in English and French, accompanying John Coney's Architectural Beauties of Continental Europe, London, from 1831.
- Descriptive and Historic Illustrations, accompanying Picturesque Views in England and Wales by J. M. W. Turner, 2 vols. London, 1832–1838.
- Theoretisch-praktische Englische Sprachlehre für Deutsche, 4th edit., Hamburg, 1833, a standard grammar in German universities.
- English and German Dialogues: with a collection of idioms, Hamburg, 1842.

Lloyd edited or revised:

- John Booth, Battle of Waterloo;
- C. W. Rördansz, European Commerce, 1818 (another edit. 1819);
- C. T. Rabenhorst, German and English Dictionary, 1829;
- Englisches Lesebuch (Gems of Modern English Literature), Hamburg, 1832; and
- Benjamin Guy Babington's translation of Justus Hecker's Epidemics of the Middle Ages, 1844 (Sydenham Society).

Among his translations were:

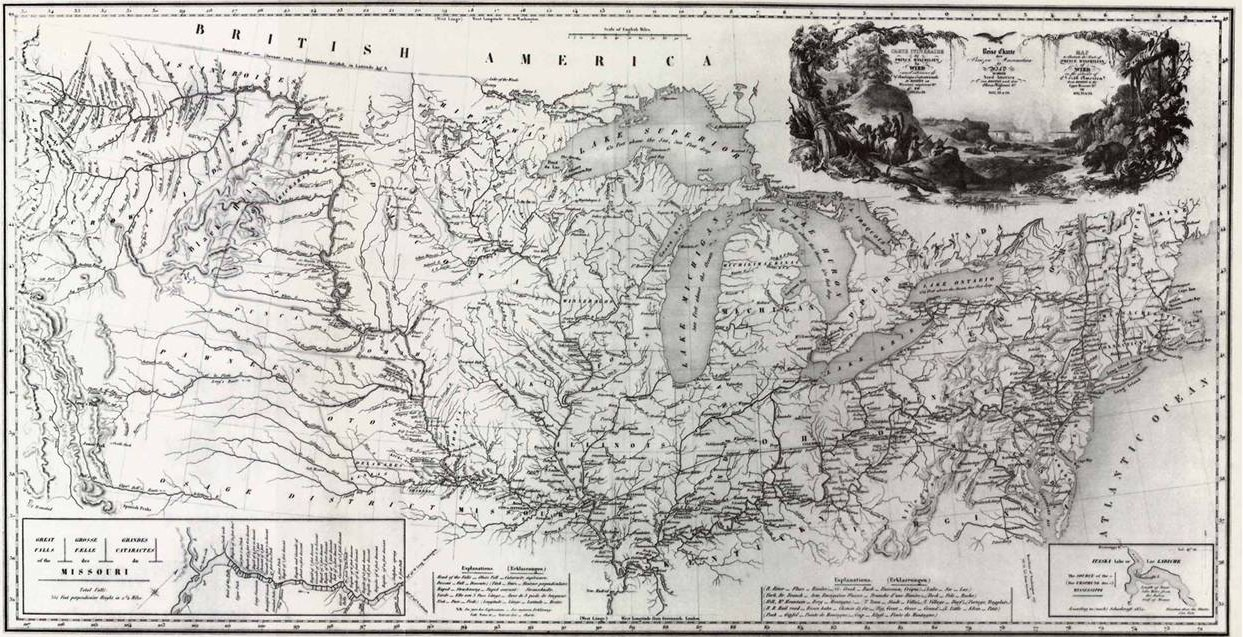
Map from Prince Maximilian of Wied-Neuwied, Travels in the Interior of North America, 1843, translated by Hannibal Evans Lloyd

- August Wilhelm Iffland, Nephews, a play, 1799;
- Hans Egede Saabye, Greenland, 1818;
- Prince Maximilian of Wied-Neuwied, Travels in Brazil, 1820;
- Otto von Kotzebue, Voyage of Discovery into the South Sea and Beerings Straits [anon.], 1821;
- Johann Baptist von Spix and Carl Friedrich Philipp von Martius, Travels in Brazil, 1824;
- Egor Fedorovich Timkovskii, Travels of the Russian Mission through Mongolia to China, 1827;
- Friedrich Ludwig Georg von Raumer, England in 1835, 3 vols. 1836, with Sarah Austin;
- O. L. B. Wolff and H. Doering, German Tourist, 1837;
- Friedrich Ludwig Georg von Raumer, Political History of England, 2 vols. 1837;
- Gustav Friedrich Waagen, Works of Art and Artists in England, 1838;
- Magnus Fredrik Ferdinand Björnstjerna, British Empire in the East [anon.], 1840;
- Friedrich Ludwig Georg von Raumer, England in 1841, 1842;
- Prince Maximilian of Wied-Neuwied, Travels in the Interior of North America, 1843;
- Magnus Fredrik Ferdinand Björnstjerna, Theogony of the Hindoos [anon.], 1844;
- Friedrich Christoph Dahlmann, History of the English Revolution, 1844;
- Leopold von Orlich, Travels in India, 1845;
- Hermann Ludwig Heinrich Pueckler-Muskau, Egypt under Mehemet Ali, 1845;
- Georg Tams, Visit to the Portuguese Possessions in South-Western Africa, 1845; and
- Ernst, Baron von Feuchtersleben, Principles of Medical Psychology, 1847, revised by B. G. Babington (Sydenham Society).

== Family ==
By his marriage to Lucy Anna Margaretta Von Schwartzkopff of Hamburg, Lloyd had a son and four daughters, including the writers and educational missionaries Susette Harriet Smith, Elizabeth Maria Bowen Thompson and Augusta Mott.

== Notes ==
Attribution

This article incorporates text from a publication now in the public domain: Lee, Sidney, ed. (1893). "Lloyd, Hannibal Evans". Dictionary of National Biography. Vol. 33. London: Smith, Elder & Co.
