= Afaf Lutfi al-Sayyid-Marsot =

Arab-American historian (born 1933)

Afaf Lutfi al-Sayyid-Marsot (Arabic: عفاف لطفي السيد مارسو; born 1933) is an Egyptian-born historian, professor of history at the University of California, Los Angeles, who has written on the history of Egypt since the eighteenth century.

== Life ==
Born in Cairo, Afaf Lutfi al-Sayyid was conversant in politics since her childhood. Her father was an undersecretary of state for social affairs in the Egyptian government. She gained a B.A. in sociology from the American University in Cairo in 1952, an M.A. in political science from Stanford University. She taught for some time at the American University in Cairo and then earned a D.Phil. in oriental studies from Oxford University studying with Albert Hourani in 1963. She was the first Egyptian woman to earn a doctoral degree from Oxford University. She became professor in history at UCLA in 1968. She married Alain Marsot, also an academic and professor of political science. Dr. al-Sayyid Marsot held various visiting positions and was awarded academic honors including: - Distinguished Visiting Professor at the American University, Cairo, 1976 -George Antonius Distinguished Lecture, St. Antony's College, Oxford, 1980 -Distinguished Lecturer at Georgetown University, 1988 -Woman of the Year Award by the Arab- American Press Guild, Los Angeles, 1988 -Arab-American Muslim Achievement Award, Los Angeles, 1992 -Middle East Studies Association Mentoring Award, 2000 -Doctor of Humane Letters conferred by the American University in Cairo, 2001 -Distinguished Visiting Professor at the American University, Cairo 2009

== Works ==
- Egypt and Cromer: a study in Anglo-Egyptian relations, 1968
- Egypt's liberal experiment, 1922-1936, 1977
- Society and the sexes in medieval Islam, 1979
- Egypt in the reign of Muhammed Ali, 1983
- Protest movements and religious undercurrents in Egypt, past and present, 1984
- A short history of modern Egypt, 1985
- Women and men in late eighteenth-century Egypt, 1995
- A history of Egypt: from the Arab conquest to the present, 2007
