= Nigel Thorpe =

British diplomat

Nigel James Thorpe CVO (born 3 October 1945) is a former British diplomat whose final posting was as Ambassador to Hungary.

== Diplomatic career ==
Nigel Thorpe joined the Foreign and Commonwealth Office (FCO) in 1969. He was posted as Third Secretary later Second Secretary to Warsaw in 1970. Three years later he went to Dacca where he was appointed First Secretary. He returned to the FCO in 1975 and was posted in 1979 as First Secretary (Economic) to Ottawa. He was seconded to the Department of Energy in 1981. The following year, he was appointed Assistant Head of the FCO's Southern African Department. In 1985, he was posted as Counsellor and Head of Chancery to Warsaw. He was appointed Ambassador to Hungary in 1998.

== Post-retirement ==
Following his retirement from HM Diplomatic Service, Thorpe remained in Budapest until November 2008 as Chairman of Vodafone Hungary.

== Family ==
In 1969, Thorpe married Felicity Thompson. They had two sons (1971 and 1972). The marriage was dissolved in 1976. He married Susan Diane Bamforth in 1978. They had twin daughters in 1985.

== Honours and recognition ==
Thorpe was appointed a Commander of the Royal Victorian Order (CVO) in November 1991.
