= Susette Harriet Smith =

British travel writer, translator and educational missionary (c.1810–1885)

Susette Harriet Smith (née Lloyd; c. 1810, possibly in Hanover – 25 January 1885, Beirut, Syria vilayet), also known by the pen name Mrs. Henry Smith, was a British travel writer, translator and educational missionary. The daughter of the philologist and translator Hannibal Evans Lloyd, Smith was the sister of the writers and educational missionaries Elizabeth Maria Bowen Thompson and Augusta Mott.
