= John Coney (engraver) =

English architectural draughtsman and engraver

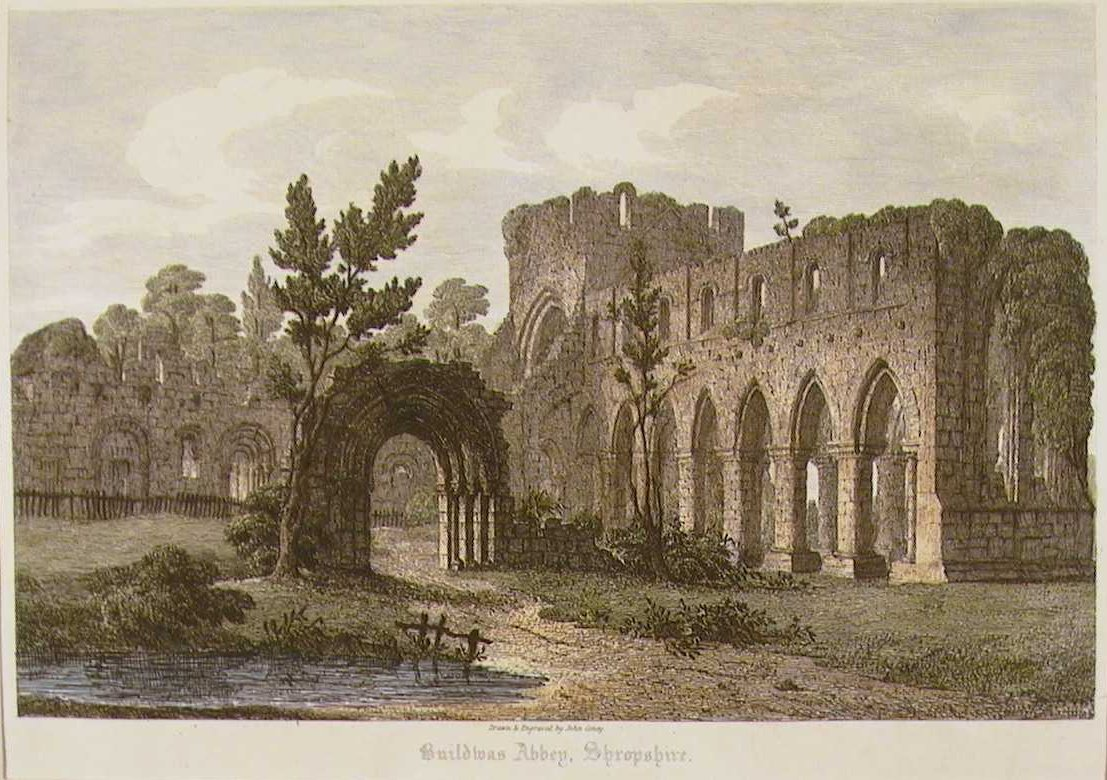
Buildwas Abbey, 1825

John Coney (1786–1833) was an English architectural draughtsman and engraver.

== Life ==
He was born at Ratcliffe Highway, London. He was apprenticed to an architect, but never followed the profession. He commenced making pencil drawings of the interior of Westminster Abbey and other Gothic buildings as early as the age of fifteen; these he sold to dealers, and other casual customers, at low prices.

He died in Camberwell in 1833.

== Works ==
In 1815, he published his first work, a series of eight views of the exterior and interior of Warwick Castle, drawn and etched by himself. Shortly afterwards he was employed by Harding to draw and engrave a series of exterior and interior views of the cathedrals and abbey churches of England, to illustrate a new edition of William Dugdale's Monasticon, edited by Sir Henry Ellis. These plates occupied a great portion of his time for fourteen years, and were executed with consummate skill. In 1829, he began the engravings of 'Ancient Cathedrals, Hôtels de Ville, and other public buildings in France, Holland, Germany, and Italy'; which were drawn from life by himself. This work was intended to be in twelve parts, but only eight were published. Charles Heathcote Tatham wrote the descriptions.

In 1831 Coney began a similar series of the Architectural Beauties of Continental Europe, for which Hannibal Evans Lloyd wrote the descriptions. This work consists of 28 large plates of remarkable edifices in France, the Low Countries, Germany, and Italy, and 56 vignettes, all drawn and etched by himself. In addition to these undertakings, he executed numerous drawings in pencil, and also in colours, for private commissions; and necessity often compelled him to part with many to picture-dealers and print-sellers. He was employed by the architect Cockerell to engrave a very large 'View of Rome', and another plate as a companion to it, neither of which was published. His drawings exhibit all the minutest details without the appearance of labour, yet with a neatness that is truly surprising. A 'View of the Interior of Milan Cathedral' was published after his death for the benefit of his widow.

His work is kept in several museums worldwide, including the British Museum, the Victoria and Albert Museum, the University of Michigan Museum of Art, the Indianapolis Museum of Art, the Dallas Museum of Art, and the Fine Arts Museums of San Francisco.
