= Henry Lloyd (soldier) =

Welsh army officer and military writer (1720–1783)

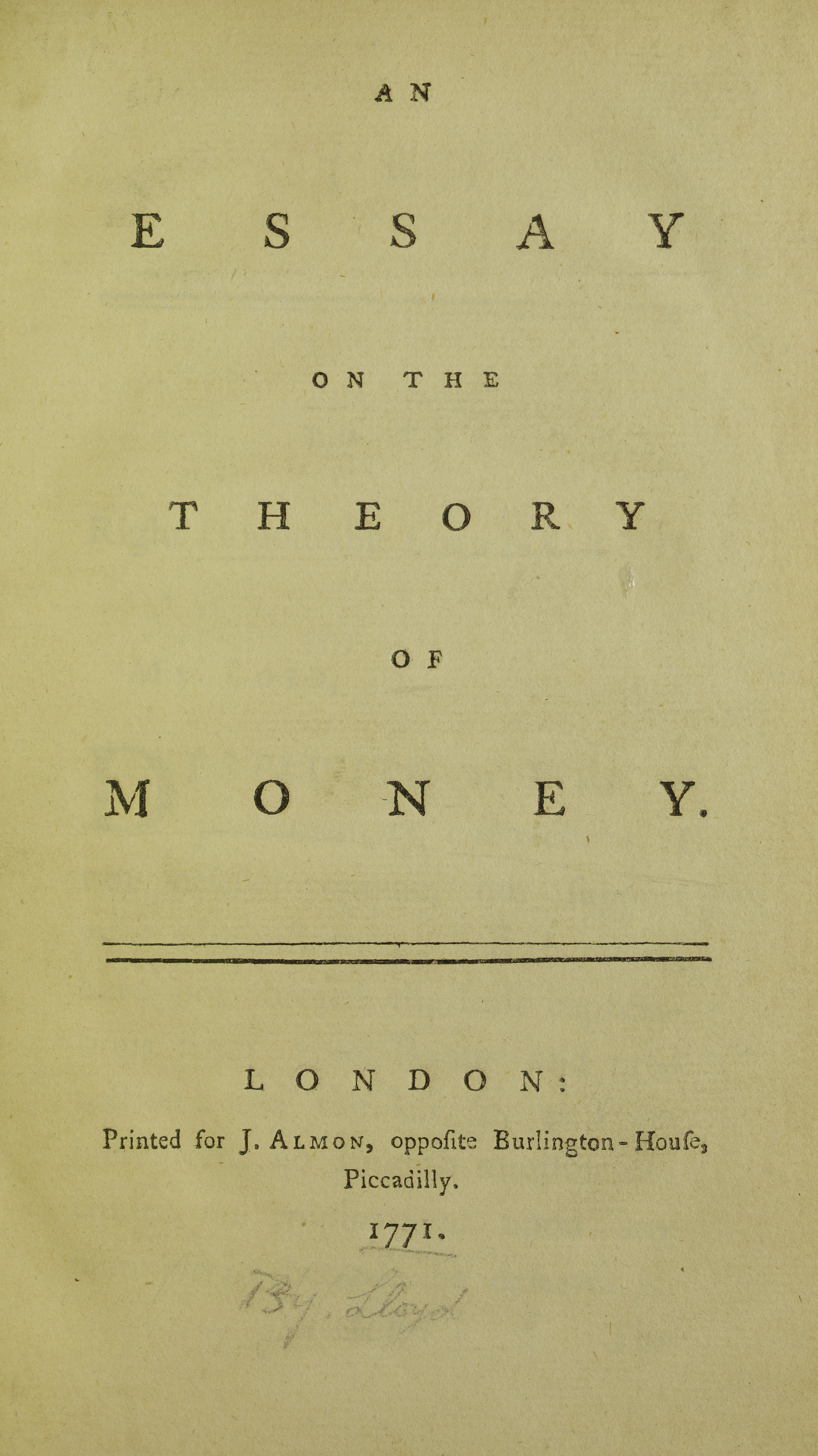
Essay on the theory of money, 1771

Henry Humphrey Evans Lloyd (c.1718 – 19 June 1783) was a Welsh army officer and military writer. He fought for the French against the Austrians, the Jacobite forces of Charles Stuart against the British, the Austrians against the Prussians and the Prussians against the Austrians (during the same war), and the Russians against the Turks. He also undertook various diplomatic missions for Britain. His writings on military theory were studied by George Washington and George S. Patton, and were used by J. F. C. Fuller to espouse a science of war.

== Early life ==
Lloyd, a clergyman's son, was possibly born in Llanbedr, Merioneth, but the "Memoir of General Lloyd, Author of the History of the Seven Years War, etc, etc by his son Hannibal Evans Lloyd. [Printed for Private Circulation] 1842: Marchant, Singer, and Smith, Printers, Ingram Court " [copy in the Fitzwilliam Museum, Cambridge] states he was born in Wrecsam (Wrexham). Lloyd was educated at Jesus College, Oxford, 1740-c.1742. He could not afford to purchase a commission in the army and so resorted to alternative methods to begin his military career. He travelled to France in 1744, but was unable to obtain an appointment as an officer. He then spent a year at a Jesuit college as a lay brother, instructing officers in geography and field engineering.

== Military engagements ==
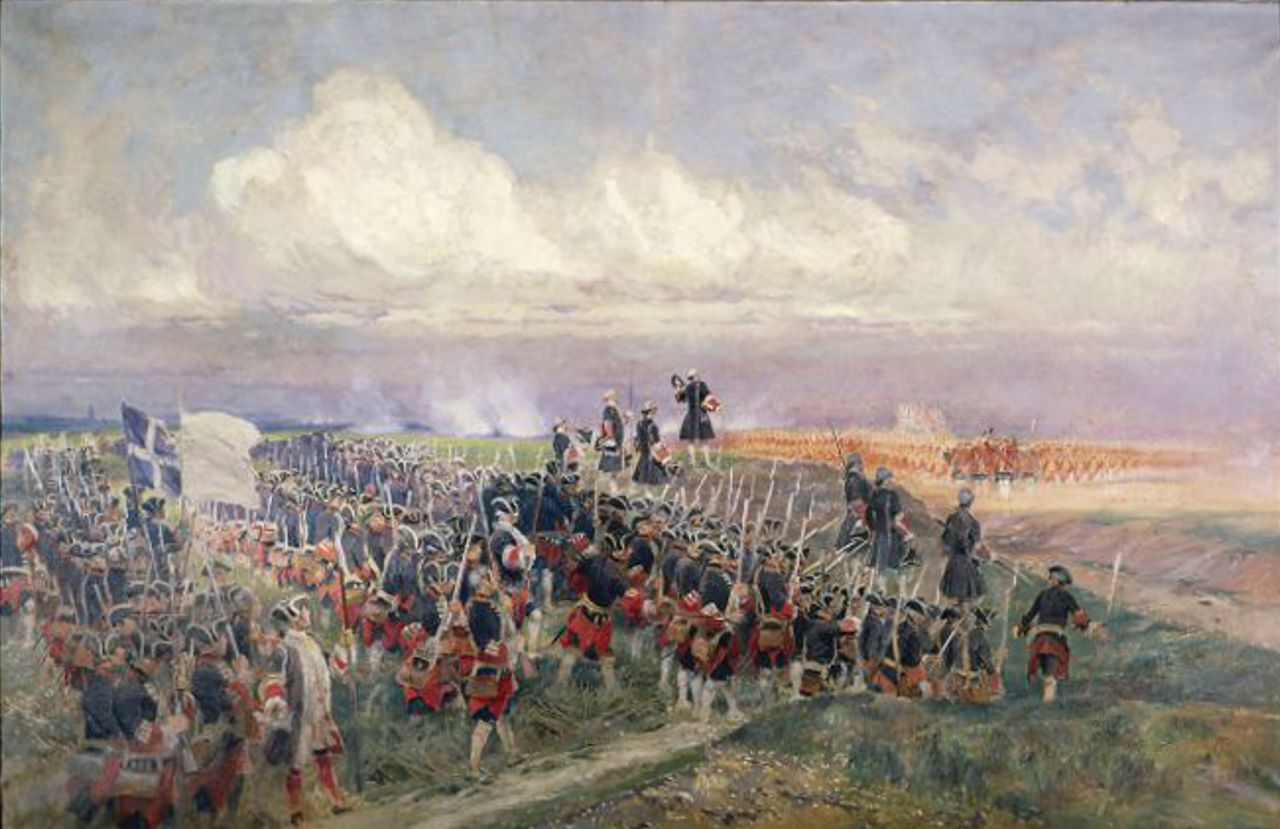
The Battle of Fontenoy (by Edouard Detaille)

In 1745, Lloyd accompanied the French army on an invasion of the Austrian Netherlands (part of the War of the Austrian Succession which lasted from 1740 to 1748). He was commissioned into the French engineer corps after his sketches at the battle of Fontenoy came to the attention of the French commanding engineer.

With the rank of captain, Lloyd then accompanied the 1745–46 Jacobite expedition in support of the Young Pretender to Scotland. He left the army to carry dispatches to rebels in Wales and then surveyed the south coast of England (disguised as a clergyman) in anticipation of a French invasion. He was arrested as a suspected spy and taken to London, but his release was procured by John Drummond and Lloyd returned to France. He fought for the French army as a major at the siege of Bergen op Zoom in 1747. He then served the Prussian army before returning to French service in 1754 in the service of Marshal Charles Louis Auguste Fouquet de Belle-Isle. He then returned to England, this time disguised as a merchant, to carry out another survey of the coast for a French landing. He met up with Drummond in London, in 1756, claiming to be receiving £500 a year from the British government: Lloyd was never commissioned in the British army, but this may have been secret service money.

He then joined the Austrian army as a lieutenant-colonel, and was a quartermaster on the staff of Field Marshal Franz Moritz von Lacy during the first stages of the Seven Years' War. After being promoted to major-general, Lloyd changed allegiances in 1760 and joined the Prussian army, serving under Ferdinand, Duke of Brunswick. In 1763, he tried to join the Portuguese forces, who were preparing to defend themselves against Spain but the conflict ended before he was able to secure a post with Count Wilhelm Schaumburg-Lippe.

== Later career ==
Lloyd then returned to England, combining writing with other activities. He was said to have been involved in negotiations for the marriage of King George III and Queen Charlotte. In 1768, Lloyd undertook a secret mission for Britain in Italy, organizing supplies for the defence of Corsica. In 1773, he was in charge of a Russian army division fighting Turkey, with particular distinction at the failed siege of Silistra. He also fought for Russia against Sweden, but is said to have left the Russian army after being refused the award of the Order of St Anne because he was not of noble birth. After travels to other places such as Italy, Spain and Gibraltar, Lloyd died in The Hague in 1783.

== Publications and influence ==
Lloyd published Capt. Lloyd's Lists in 1760, containing information on the various armies of Europe. However, other works of his, on military strategy, had a more lasting impact. In 1766, he published The history of the late war in Germany between the king of Prussia and the empress of Germany and her allies, adding Reflections on the principles of the art of war for the second edition in 1781. This became his most influential book. It was translated into German (five editions) and French (three editions). A second volume was added in 1784, after his death, compiled from his papers. These writings led to Lloyd being regarded by James Jay Carafano as "the father of the principles of modern warfare". He wrote on how to organize armies and conduct operations, using mathematical calculations. He was influenced by French military theory and also Enlightenment philosophy that human behaviour could be predicted using rational rules, having studied in 1759 with the Milanese philosopher Pietro Verri.

In 1770, he wrote An Essay on the English Constitution and, in 1771, An Essay on the Theory of Money. In 1779, he wrote A Rhapsody of the Present System of French Politics on methods of frustrating a French invasion of Britain. After his death, confidential papers were said to have been removed from his house by British agents and his heirs were paid not to republish the book – ineffectively, since it was republished as A Political and Military Rhapsody on the Invasion and Defence of Great Britain in 1794 and 1798 when French invasion was again feared. George Washington had a well-read copy of this book in his library. It was presented to him by a Mr Bird of London, calling attention to references about the use of the pike in Indian wars.

Lloyd influenced the British military strategist J. F. C. Fuller, who considered Lloyd's work in the light of the trench warfare of the First World War. In the Second World War, the American general George S. Patton had a dog-eared copy of Lloyd's History in his library. He had the copy rebound after a fire damaged his copy in 1925. Patton marked the spine "R" for "Read".

== Works ==
- Lloyd, Henry (1771). Essay on the theory of money. London: John Almon.
