= John Snodgrass (diplomat) =

British diplomat

John Michael Owen Snodgrass CMG (12 August 1928 – 4 February 2008) was a British diplomat.

He was educated at Marlborough College and Trinity Hall, Cambridge (MA).

== Position held ==
- 3rd Sec., Rome, 1953–1956
- 1st Sec., Beirut, 1960–1963
- Consul-General to Jerusalem, 1970–74.
- Counsellor British Embassy, South Africa, 1974–77.
- Head of South Pacific, Foreign and Commonwealth Office, 1977–80.
- Ambassador to Zaire, Congo, Rwanda and Burundi, 1980–83.
- Ambassador to Bulgaria, 1983–86.

Diplomatic posts
Preceded by Alan Donald	Ambassador of the United Kingdom to the Democratic Republic of Congo; 1980–1983	Succeeded by Nicholas Bayne
Preceded by Giles Bullard	Ambassador Extraordinary and Plenipotentiary at Sofia; 1983–1986	Succeeded by John Fawcett
