= Harold Beeley =

British diplomat and historian

Beeley in 1955.

Sir Harold Beeley KCMG CBE (15 February 1909 – 27 July 2001) was a British diplomat, historian and Arabist. Beeley began his career as a historian and lecturer, and after World War II, he joined the British diplomatic service and served in posts and ambassadorships related to the Middle East. He returned to teaching after retiring as a diplomat and stayed active in many organisations related to the Middle East.

== Early life and academics ==
Beeley was born in Manchester, England, to an upper-middle-class London merchant in 1909, and studied at Highgate School and The Queen's College, Oxford, gaining a First in Modern History. He began his career in academia; from 1930 he began to teach modern history as an assistant lecturer at Sheffield University, and the next year he moved to University College London also as an assistant lecturer. In 1935, he was appointed as a junior research fellow and lecturer at The Queen's College, Oxford and, during 1938 to 1939, Beeley lectured at University College Leicester. During his academic career, he wrote a short biography on British Prime Minister Benjamin Disraeli, which was one of a series of Great Lives biographies published by Duckworth in 1936.

Beeley did not serve in the British armed forces during World War II because of his poor eyesight. Instead, he worked at Chatham House with Arnold Toynbee in 1939. He subsequently joined the Foreign Office's Research Department and finally worked on the Preparatory Commission of the United Nations in San Francisco in 1945, where he helped design the UN Trusteeship Council, along with Ralph Bunche.

Before becoming a diplomat, Beeley was chosen to serve as Secretary of the Anglo-American Commission of Inquiry on Palestine in 1946. From then onmwrd, Beeley believed that the founding of Israel would forever complicate relations between the United Kingdom and the Middle East, which resulted in an enduring dislike of him among leading Zionists and the Jewish Agency. According to The New York Times, his views on the issue may have helped persuade Ernest Bevin to try to limit Jewish immigration to the region.

== Diplomatic career ==
=== Beginning ===
In 1946, Beeley officially joined Her Majesty's Diplomatic Service, which at his age was later than most. His first posting was as assistant in the geographical department responsible for Palestine, which led him to advise Foreign Secretary Ernest Bevin. Together with Bevin, he negotiated "the Portsmouth Treaty" with Iraq (signed on 15 January 1948), which was accompanied by a British undertaking to withdraw from Palestine in such a fashion as to provide for swift Arab occupation of all its territory. According to Iraqi Foreign Minister Muhammad Fadhel al-Jamali,

"It was agreed that Iraq would buy for the Iraqi police force 50,000 tommy-guns. We intended to hand them over to the Palestine army volunteers for self-defence. Great Britain was ready to provide the Iraqi army with arms and ammunition as set forth in a list prepared by the Iraqi General Staff. The British undertook to withdraw from Palestine gradually, so that Arab forces could enter every area evacuated by the British so that the whole of Palestine should be in Arab hands after the British withdrawal. The meeting ended and we were all optimistic about the future of Palestine."

Beeley spent 1949 to 1950 as the Deputy Head of Mission in Copenhagen and moved on to Baghdad from 1950 to 1953 and Washington, DC, from 1953 to 1955, where he worked closely with the US State Department. He was then appointed to his first ambassadorship, as UK ambassador to Saudi Arabia in 1955, but within months, he caught tuberculosis in Jidda and was forced to return.

=== Suez ===
After he recovered, Beeley returned in June 1956 to be the Assistant Under-Secretary for Middle East affairs, where he remained until 1958, living in London's St John's Wood. During that time, he was not informed of the secret plans drawn up between Britain, France and Israel, which resulted in the Suez Crisis. That led him sincerely though mistakenly to tell US officials that there were no plans for a British intervention. Beeley not only participated in efforts to end the international crisis but also chaired the Suez Canal Users' Association in its aftermath.

=== United Nations ===
In 1958, he left his desk job to be Deputy Head of the British Mission to the UN. Here Beeley was engaged in efforts to solve the Buraimi dispute and in the UN's peacekeeping mission in the Congo (Léopoldville), He developed a close relationship with UN Secretary General Dag Hammarskjöld. He also took part in the 1958 Murphy-Beeley mission, which was launched in response to French bombings over the border into Tunisia during the Algerian War.

=== Egypt ===
In 1961, he left New York City to become the ambassador to the United Arab Republic in Cairo (the name official name of Egypt at the time though Syria had left the union taht year), which, considering his stance on Israel, was met with displeasure by the Israeli government. Leaving the post in 1964, Beeley spent the years 1964 to 1967 as UK Representative to the Disarmament Conference at Geneva and was then reappointed as the Special Envoy of Foreign Secretary George Brown and was subsequently ambassador to Egypt from 1967 to 1969; he retired from the Diplomatic Service at that time.

His service in Egypt was marked by difficulty. During his first tour he represented the first British ambassador to Egypt since the Suez Crisis, yet according to The Daily Telegraph, "He went on to develop a relationship with the Egyptian people, and especially with President Nasser, unequalled by any British envoy of his generation". Among his accomplishments during the first period was gaining permission for the British Council to return to Egypt and settling compensation claims made by British citizens who had been expelled from the country. His second tour occurred in the wake of the Six-Day War, yet he again succeeded in repairing relations.

== Later life ==
Beeley returned to academia following the end of his diplomatic career and also served in several positions related to the Middle East. In 1969, he became a lecturer in history at Queen Mary College, London, where he remained until 1975. He also became president of the UK's Egypt Exploration Society in 1969, and served as such until 1988. In 1971, he and Christopher Mayhew were instrumental in the establishment of a periodical on current events in the Arab world, Middle East International, of which he became vice-chairman. Until 1995 he contribute two or three book reviews a year. In 1973, he was appointed chairman of the World of Islam Festival Trust, where he stayed until 1996, and from 1981 to 1992, he served as chairman of the Egyptian-British Chamber of Commerce.

== Personal life ==
Beeley married twice, first to Millicent Chinn in 1933, with whom he had two daughters. They divorced in 1953 and he then married Patricia Brett-Smith in 1958, with whom he had another daughter, Vanessa Beeley, who is a blogger known for her reporting on the conflict in Syria and her support for Syrian President Bashar al-Assad.

Patricia died in 1999. According to a 1958 profile in The New York Times, Beeley was said to have enjoyed walking, theatre and films.

== Honours ==
- Commander of the Order of the British Empire (1946)
- Companion of the Order of St Michael and St George (1953)
- Knight Commander of the Order of St Michael and St George (1961)

== Writings ==
- Beeley, Harold (1936). Disraeli. London: Duckworth.

Diplomatic posts
Unknown	British Ambassador to Saudi Arabia; 1955	Succeeded by Sir Roderick Parkes
Preceded by Colin Crowe as Chargé d'affaires	British Ambassador to the United Arab Republic; 1961–1964	Succeeded by Sir George Middleton
Vacant Rhodesia Crisis Title last held by Sir George Middleton	British Ambassador to the United Arab Republic; 1967–1969	Succeeded by Sir Richard Beaumont
