= List of ambassadors of the United Kingdom to Tunisia =

The ambassador of the United Kingdom to Tunisia is the United Kingdom's foremost diplomatic representative to the Republic of Tunisia, and head of the UK's diplomatic mission in Tunis.

== Ambassadors ==
- 1956–1960: Angus Malcolm
- 1960–1963: Anthony Lambert
- 1963–1966: Sir Herbert Marchant
- 1966–1967: Robin Hooper
- 1968–1970: Sir Edward Warner
- 1970–1973: Archibald Mackenzie
- 1973–1975: John Marnham
- 1975–1977: Glencairn Balfour Paul
- 1977–1981: Sir John Lambert
- 1981–1984: Sir Alexander Stirling
- 1984–1987: Sir James Adams
- 1987–1992: Stephen Day
- 1992–1995: Michael Tait
- 1995–1999: Richard Edis
- 1999–2002: Ivor Rawlinson
- 2002–2004: Robin Kealy
- 2004–2008: Alan Goulty
- 2008–2013: Chris O'Connor
- 2013–2016: Hamish Cowell
- 2016–2020: Louise De Sousa

-2020-2021: Edward Oakden [www.gov.uk/government/people/edward-oakden, British Ambassador to Tunisia], gov.uk

- 2021–2024: Helen Winterton
- 2024–present: Roderick Drummond
