= John Lambert (diplomat) =

British diplomat

Sir John Lambert KCVO CMG

British Ambassador to Tunisia
- In office 1977–1981
- Preceded by: Glencairn Balfour Paul
- Succeeded by: Sir Alexander Stirling

Personal details
- Born: 8 January 1921
- Died: 6 July 2015 (aged 94)
- Children: 3
- Education: Trinity College, Cambridge
- Occupation: Diplomat

Sir John Henry Lambert, KCVO, CMG (8 January 1921 – 6 July 2015) was a British diplomat. From 1977 to 1981 he was the United Kingdom's ambassador to Tunisia.

== Early life ==
Lambert was born on 8 January 1921 to Ronald Lambert, MC and Hazel Mary Lambert (née Cox). He was educated at Eton College, an all-boys public school near Windsor, Berkshire. He spent one year studying at Trinity College, Cambridge, before being called up for military service in 1940.

== Military service ==
In 1940, Lambert was called up for military service.

== Diplomatic career ==
On 18 September 1977, he was appointed Her Majesty's Ambassador to the Tunisian Republic.

== Honours and decorations ==
He was appointed CMG in the 1975 New Year Honours, and on 23 October 1980 Lambert was appointed Knight Commander of the Royal Victorian Order (KCVO). He was knighted by Queen Elizabeth II aboard HMY Britannia at the end of her state visit to Tunisia in October 1980. In 1980, he was appointed Grand Officer of the Order of the Tunisian Republic.

Diplomatic posts
Preceded by Glencairn Balfour Paul	British Ambassador to Tunisia; 1977–1981	Succeeded by Sir Alexander Stirling
