= Afnan Al-Shuaiby =

Saudi national

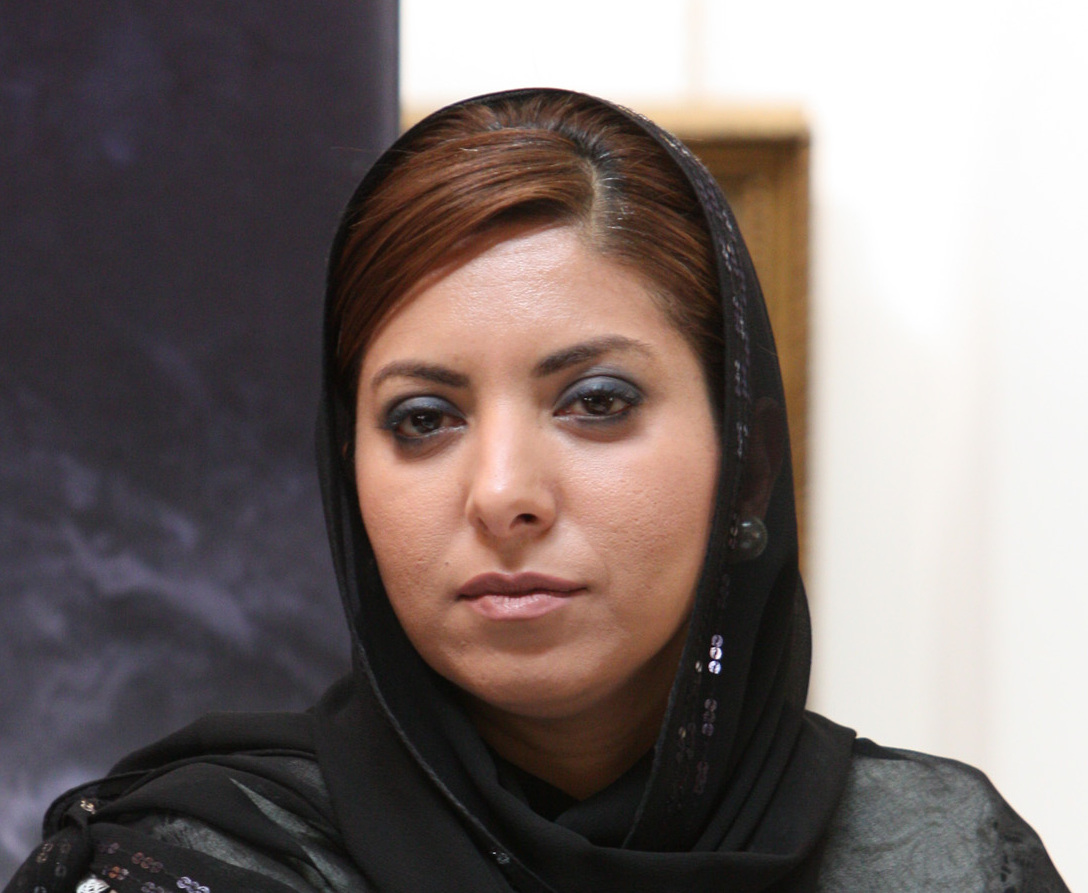
Al-Shuaiby at the G8 Deauville Partnership: Women in Business Conference in London

Afnan Al-Shuaiby (Arabic: أفنان الشعيبي ‘Āfnān ash-Shu‘ībī) is a Saudi national who is the former Secretary General and Chief Executive of the Arab British Chamber of Commerce (ABCC) in London, England. She has held various positions in Saudi Arabia in education, and foreign companies in the USA. She sits on the boards of many organizations.

== Early life ==
Al-Shuaiby spent much of her early childhood in England. She completed her undergraduate education in Riyadh before moving to the United States to pursue her postgraduate education.

== Education ==
Al-Shuaiby was educated at King Saud University, graduating with a degree in English literature. She completed a Master of Arts in Educational Administration at the American University in Washington, D.C. She holds a PhD from George Washington University in Leadership Administration. Al-Shuaiby holds a certificate in Peace and Conflict Resolution from the School of International Service, American University Washington, D.C., and Executive Education from the Harvard Kennedy School.

== Professional career ==
In 2007, Al-Shuaiby was appointed Secretary-General and Chief Executive of the Arab British Chamber of Commerce. Dr. Al-Shuaiby worked as Advisor to the President of the US-Saudi Arabian Business Council in Washington, D.C. and is a member of the Board of Directors of the London-based Arab International Women’s Forum (AIWF). Al-Shuaiby is a public speaker, who has delivered speeches events, forums, and conferences on a range of issues, particularly the empowerment of women, women in business, and trade and investment. She contributes a monthly article to Hia Magazine.

In 2019 she was appointed Director General of International Relations at the Saudi Ministry of Culture.

== Recognition and awards ==
Dr Al-Shuaiby was nominated for the Business Services Award Category in 2009, and she was named "Diplomat of the Year" for the Middle East in 2011 in recognition of her achievements as a foreign diplomat in London by Diplomat Magazine. In the same year, Dr. Al-Shuaiby was the recipient of the World of Difference 100 Award 2011 from The International Alliance for Women (TIAW). Dr Al-Shuaiby topped the list of the 30 most powerful women in Saudi Arabia in 2014 as reported by the Arabian Business website.
