= List of ambassadors of the United Kingdom to Lebanon =

The ambassador of the United Kingdom to Lebanon is the United Kingdom's foremost diplomatic representative in the Lebanese Republic, and head of the UK's diplomatic mission in Beirut.

The first two British envoys were appointed during World War II to both Lebanon and Syria. Since 1923 both countries had been under French mandate from the League of Nations. During the war, however, France was partly occupied by Germany and French troops in Lebanon and Syria were loyal to the Vichy French government, so the Allies invaded and occupied Lebanon and Syria in 1941. Both countries became independent after the war.

== List of heads of mission ==
=== Envoys extraordinary and ministers plenipotentiary to the Syrian and Lebanese Republics ===
- 1942–1944: Major General Sir Edward Spears
- 1944–1947: Sir Terence Shone

=== Envoys extraordinary and ministers plenipotentiary at Beirut ===
- 1947–1951: Sir William Houstoun-Boswall
- 1951–1952: Edwin Chapman-Andrews

=== Ambassadors extraordinary and plenipotentiary at Beirut ===
- 1952–1956: Sir Edwin Chapman-Andrews
- 1956–1958: Sir George Middleton
- 1958–1963: Sir Moore Crosthwaite
- 1963–1967: Sir Derek Riches
- 1967–1970: Cecil King
- 1970–1971: Alan Edden
- 1971–1975: Paul Wright
- 1975–1978: Peter Wakefield
- 1978–1981: Benjamin Strachan
- 1981–1983: Sir David Roberts
- 1983–1985: Sir David Miers
- 1985–1988: Sir John Gray
- 1988–1990: Sir Allan Ramsay
- 1990–1992: David Tatham
- 1992–1996: Maeve Fort
- 1996–2000: David MacLennan
- 2000–2003: Richard Kinchen
- 2003–2006: James Watt
- 2006–2011: Frances Guy
- 2011–2015: Thomas Fletcher
- 2015–2018: Hugo Shorter
- 2018–2020: Chris Rampling
- 2021–2022: Ian Collard
- 2022–present: Hamish Cowell
