= Alan Goulty =

British diplomat (born 1947)

Alan Fletcher Goulty CMG (born 2 July 1947) is a retired British diplomat.

Goulty graduated with a Modern History degree from Oxford in 1968 and joined the Foreign Office the same year. He attended MECAS from 1969 to 1971. After a number of posts in the Middle East and North Africa Goulty became Ambassador to Sudan (1995-1999) and later Ambassador to Tunisia (2004-2008).

Since 2013 he has been a Global Fellow at the Woodrow Wilson International Center for Scholars.

Diplomatic posts
Preceded by Peter Streams	British Ambassador to Sudan; 1995-1999	Succeeded by Richard Makepeace
Preceded by Allan Ramsay	British Ambassador to Tunisia; 2004-2008	Succeeded by Chris O'Connor

== Honours ==
- Companion of the Order of St Michael and St George (CMG) - 1998
