= Edwin Chapman-Andrews =

British diplomat (1903–1980)

Sir Edwin Chapman-Andrews KCMG OBE

British Ambassador to Sudan
- In office 1956–1961
- Preceded by: Sir Philip Adams
- Succeeded by: Sir Roderick Parkes

British Ambassador to Lebanon
- In office 1952–1956
- Preceded by: Sir William Houstoun-Boswall
- Succeeded by: Sir George Middleton

Personal details
- Born: 9 September 1903
- Died: 10 February 1980 (aged 76)
- Children: 4
- Education: University College London
- Occupation: Diplomat

Sir Edwin Arthur Chapman-Andrews (9 September 1903 – 10 February 1980) was a British diplomat. He served as ambassador to Lebanon from 1952 to 1956 and ambassador to Sudan from 1956 to 1961.

== Early life and education ==
Chapman-Andrews was born on 9 September 1903 in Devon, the son of Arthur John Chapman-Andrews and Ada Allen of Exeter. He was educated at Hele's School, Exeter; University College London; and Sorbonne University.

== Career ==
Chapman-Andrews began his career as a probationer vice-consul in the Levant Consular Service in 1926, and was acting vice-consul at Port Said, Cairo and Suez from 1928 to 1929, and acting vice-consul, Addis Ababa in 1930. After a year in the Foreign Office, he was vice-consul at Kirkuk, and at Rawandiz from 1933 to 1935. He was acting consul at Harar from 1935 to 1936, and assistant Oriental Secretary at Cairo from 1937 to 1940. When Italy invaded Abyssinia, he met Emperor Haile Selassie in Cairo.

During World War II, Chapman-Andrews served with the Royal Sussex Regiment. He was also liaison officer on the staff of commander-in-chief, Middle East, and in 1941 returned to Addis Ababa with Emperor Haile Selassie. In 1945, he was at the Foreign Office as head of the personnel department, and in the following year was Inspector of Overseas Establishments, and helped to implement the Eden reforms for the amalgamation of the Diplomatic and Consular Services.

From 1947 to 1951, Chapman-Andrews was minister at the British Embassy in Cairo. In 1951, he was minister and head of mission at Beirut, and promoted to ambassador the following year, serving until 1956. In 1956, he was appointed ambassador to Khartoum (and consul-general in 1959), and remained in the post until his retirement in 1961. According to The Times, as ambassador he was popular with the Lebanese and Sudanese Governments, "They knew he understood their difficulties, sympathised with their aspirations and had a genuine affection for their countries."

Following his retirement from diplomatic service Chapman-Andrews joined Massey-Ferguson where he worked from 1962 to 1977, becoming Director of Exports in 1964.

== Personal life and death ==
Chapman-Andrews married Sadie Nixon in 1931 and they had two sons and two daughters.

He was a member of the British National Export Council from 1965 to 1968; a member of the Committee for Middle East Trade (COMET) from 1963 to 1965 (chairman 1965–68); a council member of the Anglo-Arab Association; a keen worker for the Order of the Knights of St John; and a member of the Royal Central Asian Society from 1962 to 1969.

Chapman-Andrews died on 10 February 1980, aged 76.

== Honours ==
Chapman-Andrews was appointed Officer of the Order of the British Empire (OBE) in the 1936 Birthday Honours. He was appointed Companion of the Order of St Michael and St George (CMG) in the 1948 Birthday Honours and promoted to Knight Commander (KCMG) in the 1953 New Year Honours. In 1955, he was appointed Knight of the Order of the Hospital of St John of Jerusalem (KStJ). He was also appointed Knight Commander of the Order of Saint Gregory the Great (KCSG).

== See also ==
- Sudan–United Kingdom relations

Diplomatic posts
Preceded by Sir William Houstoun-Boswall	British Ambassador to Lebanon; 1952–1956	Succeeded by Sir George Middleton
Preceded by Philip Adams	British Ambassador to Sudan; 1956–1961	Succeeded by Sir Roderick Parkes
