= Governor Sadler =

Governor Sadler may refer to:

- James Hayes Sadler (colonial administrator) (1851–1922), Governor of the British East Africa Protectorate from 1905 to 1909 and Governor of the Windward Islands from 1909 to 1914
- Reinhold Sadler (1848–1906), 9th Governor of Nevada from 1896 to 1903
