= Ian Dixon Scott =

British civil servant and diplomat

Sir Ian Scott KCMG KCVO CIE

British Ambassador to Norway
- In office 1965–1968
- Preceded by: Patrick Hancock
- Succeeded by: Frank Brenchley

British Ambassador to Sudan
- In office 1961–1965
- Preceded by: Roderick Parkes
- Succeeded by: John Richmond

British Ambassador to the Democratic Republic of Congo
- In office 1960–1961
- Succeeded by: Derek Riches

Personal details
- Born: 6 March 1909 Inverness
- Died: 3 March 2002 (aged 92) Aldeburgh
- Education: Inverness Royal Academy; Queen's Royal College, Trinidad
- Alma mater: Balliol College, Oxford

Sir Ian Dixon Scott KCMG KCVO CIE (6 March 1909 – 3 March 2002) was a British civil servant and a career diplomat who served as Deputy Private Secretary to the last two Viceroys of India. He was later appointed Ambassador to Congo, Sudan and Norway in the 1960s.

== Writings ==
- Notes on Chitral (1937)
- Tumbled House: the Congo at independence (1969)
- A British Tale of Indian and Foreign Service (1999)

== Personal life ==
He married, in 1937, Drusilla Lindsay, daughter of Lord Lindsay, the former Master of Balliol. They had a son and four daughters.

== Career ==
=== India and Pakistan ===
In 1932 Scott joined the Indian Civil Service - all his postings were in areas that became part of Pakistan, his first posting was to Sindh.

Scott later was sent to the North-West Frontier Province (now Khyber Province), the areas he served in were Bannu, Chitral, and near the Gilgit border. One of his guests near Gilgit border was German mountaineer Heinrich Harrer, later the author of Seven Years in Tibet.

During WW2 Scott moved to Peshawar as the Assistant Director of Intelligence - in 1942 he was surprised that the local Pashtuns had made him principal of Islamia College.

In 1945 Scott was appointed Deputy Private Secretary to the Viceroy of India, Viscount Wavell. Continuing in this role when Earl Mountbatten was appointed Viceroy.

In Notes on Chitral Scott notes that Chitral is the "north-western corner of the Indian Empire and is the only part of it" where the waters "flow into a foreign country" - that country being Afghanistan, Scott describes how Chitral is mainly a country of "high mountains, deep valleys and swift rivers" and gives an in-depth description of its geography. Scott then explains Chitral's history from ancient times until the modern period - when Scott was in Chitral the ruling family had been in power for 300 years.

Scott describes how the Chitralis had been at war with their neighbours, Gilgit, Chilas, Yasin, Kashmir and Pashtuns for most of these 300 years and how in 1854 Shah Afzal of Chitral and the Maharajah of Kashmir formed an alliance, Scott notes how Gilgit's recognition of Kashmir's suzerainty resulted in British interest in Chitral - this was because as a result of the British annexation of Punjab, Britain had become suzerain of Kashmir and thus now looked to Chitral.

It was these geopolitical developments that led to British involvement in Chitral and then to Scott himself being posted to the region.

When Pakistan became independent in 1947 Scott briefly worked in the High Commission in Karachi before returning to the UK in 1948

=== Congo ===
Scott had arrived in Belgian (pre-independence) Congo in 1960 as the Consul General of the Congo. When the Democratic Republic of Congo became independent in 1960, Her Majesty’s government upgraded the British Consulate General in Kinshasa to an Embassy, and Sir Ian Dixon Scott, formerly Consul General of the Congo, became the first ever British Ambassador to the DRC a position he held until 1961.

=== Sudan ===
Between 1961–1965, Scott served as Ambassador Extraordinary and Plenipotentiary at Khartoum

In February 1965 Queen Elizabeth was due to visit Sudan - however in the weeks running up to the visit the war in the south had been getting worse and racial killings in the capital Khartoum in December 1964 had left people shaken - all this in the aftermath of the October uprising which had see the authority of the police weakened. Queen Elizabeth had been invited by the previous military government and after their removal there had been a great deal of concern about her visit - in the event her visit went smoothly and turned out to be a success.

Scott presented Queen Elizabeth to Sudanese religious leaders including Imam El Hadi El Mahdi and Sayed Mohammed Osman El Mirghani.

=== Norway ===
Between 1965–1968, Scott served as Her Majesty's Ambassador Extraordinary and Plenipotentiary at Oslo.

== Death ==
Sir Ian Dixon Scott, died aged 92 at Aldeburgh on 3 March 2002 just days before his 93 birthday.
