= Edward Warner (diplomat) =

British diplomat (1911–2002)

Sir Edward Warner KCMG OBE

British Ambassador to Tunisia
- In office 1968–1970
- Preceded by: Sir Robin Hooper
- Succeeded by: Archibald Mackenzie

British Ambassador to Cameroon
- In office 1963–1966
- Preceded by: Cecil King
- Succeeded by: Alan Edden

Personal details
- Born: 23 March 1911
- Died: 8 February 2002 (aged 90)
- Children: 4
- Parent: George Redston Warner
- Education: King’s College, Cambridge
- Occupation: Diplomat

Sir Edward Redston Warner (23 March 1911 – 8 February 2002) was a British diplomat who served as ambassador to Cameroon from 1963 to 1966 and ambassador to Tunisia from 1968 to 1970.

== Early life and education ==
Warner was born on 23 March 1911, the son of George Redston Warner, a diplomat, and Margery Catherine (née Nicol). He was educated at Oundle School and King’s College, Cambridge.

== Career ==
Warner entered the Diplomatic Service in 1935 and was appointed a third secretary. In 1937, he was posted to Athens before he returned to the Foreign Office in 1940, and was promoted to second secretary. He was then sent on secondment to the Treasury for service in the Minister of State’s Office in Cairo in 1942, and the following year was transferred to the Embassy to the Greek Government in the city.

In 1945, he was appointed a first secretary while in the Foreign Office. In 1947, he served as head of the permanent United Kingdom delegation to the United Nations at Geneva. In 1949, he was promoted to the rank of counsellor, and appointed deputy to the British representative to the International Authority for the Ruhr. After another spell in the Foreign Office, from 1956 to 1959 he served with the UK delegation to the OEEC in Paris, and on several occasions as its head.

After serving as minister in Japan from 1959 to 1963, he was appointed Ambassador to Cameroon, a post he held until 1966. From 1966 to 1967, he was minister (Economic and Social Affairs) with the U.K. delegation at the United Nations in New York, and then served as ambassador and consul-general to Tunisia from 1968 to 1970.

== Personal life and death ==
Warner married Grizel Margaret Clerk Rattray in 1943 and they had three sons and a daughter.

Warner died on 8 February 2002, aged 90.

== Honours ==
Warner was appointed Companion of the Order of St Michael and St George (CMG) in the 1955 New Year Honours, and promoted to Knight Commander (KCMG) in the 1965 Birthday Honours. He was appointed Officer of the Order of the British Empire (OBE) in the 1948 New Year Honours.

== See also ==
- Tunisia–United Kingdom relations
- Cameroon–United Kingdom relations

Diplomatic posts
Preceded by Cecil King	British Ambassador to Cameroon; 1963–1966	Succeeded by Alan Edden
Preceded by Sir Robin Hooper	British Ambassador to Tunisia; 1968–1970	Succeeded by Archibald Mackenzie
