= William Evelyn Houstoun-Boswall =

British diplomat (1892–1960)

Sir William Evelyn Houstoun-Boswall KCMG MC

British envoy extraordinary and minister plenipotentiary to Lebanon
- In office 1947–1951
- Preceded by: Sir Terence Shone
- Succeeded by: Sir Edwin Chapman-Andrews

Personal details
- Born: 5 June 1892
- Died: 2 August 1960 (aged 68)
- Children: 1
- Education: New College, Oxford
- Occupation: Diplomat

Sir William Evelyn Houstoun-Boswall (5 June 1892 – 2 August 1960) was a British diplomat who served as envoy extraordinary and minister plenipotentiary to Lebanon from 1947 to 1951.

== Early life and education ==
Houstoun-Boswall was born on 5 June 1892, the eldest son of Alfred Houstoun-Boswall. He was educated at Wellington College, Berkshire, and New College, Oxford.

== Career ==
Houstoun-Boswall served with the Black Watch during World War I, rose to the rank of captain, was awarded the Military Cross and Croix de Guerre, and was mentioned in despatches.

In 1921, he joined the Diplomatic Service as third secretary, and was posted to Madrid and then Paris. After a spell in the Foreign Office, he was sent as second secretary to The Hague and Lisbon. In 1929, he was seconded to the Dominions Office and served in the Union of South Africa until 1932.

After promotion to first secretary in 1933, he served at Budapest and Oslo. Postings at Baghdad and Tokyo followed after promotion to counsellor of Embassy. In 1944, he was seconded and served on the staff of the resident minister in West Africa with the rank of minister. After serving as British political representative in Bulgaria from 1944 to 1946, he was appointed envoy extraordinary and minister plenipotentiary to Lebanon, a post he held until his retirement from the service in 1951.

== Personal life and death ==
Houstoun-Boswall married Margaret Dorothy Byron (OBE) in 1921 and they had a daughter.

Houstoun-Boswall died on 2 August 1960, aged 68.

== Honours ==
Houstoun-Boswall was appointed Companion of the Order of St Michael and St George (CMG) in the 1942 Birthday Honours, and promoted to Knight Commander (KCMG) in the 1949 Birthday Honours. He was awarded the Military Cross (MC) in 1919 and Croix de Guerre.

== See also ==
- Lebanon–United Kingdom relations

Diplomatic posts
Preceded by Sir Terence Shone	British Minister to Lebanon; 1947–1951	Succeeded by Sir Edwin Chapman-Andrews
