= John Richmond (diplomat) =

British diplomat

Sir John Christopher Blake Richmond KCMG (7 September 1909 – 6 July 1990) was a British diplomat and author specialising in Middle Eastern studies.

== Biography ==
Richmond was born in England but spent much of his childhood in Palestine and Jordan. He returned to England in 1922 and was educated at Lancing College, followed by Hertford College, Oxford. Following the completion of his studies he returned to the Middle East and served with British military intelligence in Egypt, Lebanon, Syria and Iraq during the Second World War. He entered the Diplomatic Service in 1947 and was British Ambassador to Kuwait between 1961–1963 and Sudan from 1965-1966. He retired in 1966 and joined the department of Islamic Studies at the University of Durham.

== Works ==
- The Arabs of Palestine (1972)
- Bahrain social and political change since the First World War (ed. with William Hale) (1976)
- A commentary on "The Palestinians and the PLO" by Bernard Lewis (1976)
- Egypt, 1798–1952: her advance towards a modern identity (1977).

Diplomatic posts
Preceded by Aubrey Halford-MacLeod	British Ambassador to Kuwait; 1961–1963	Succeeded by Noel Jackson
Preceded by Sir Ian Scott	British Ambassador to Sudan; 1965–1966	Succeeded by Sir Robert Fowler
