= Colin Crowe =

British diplomat

Sir Colin Crowe GCMG
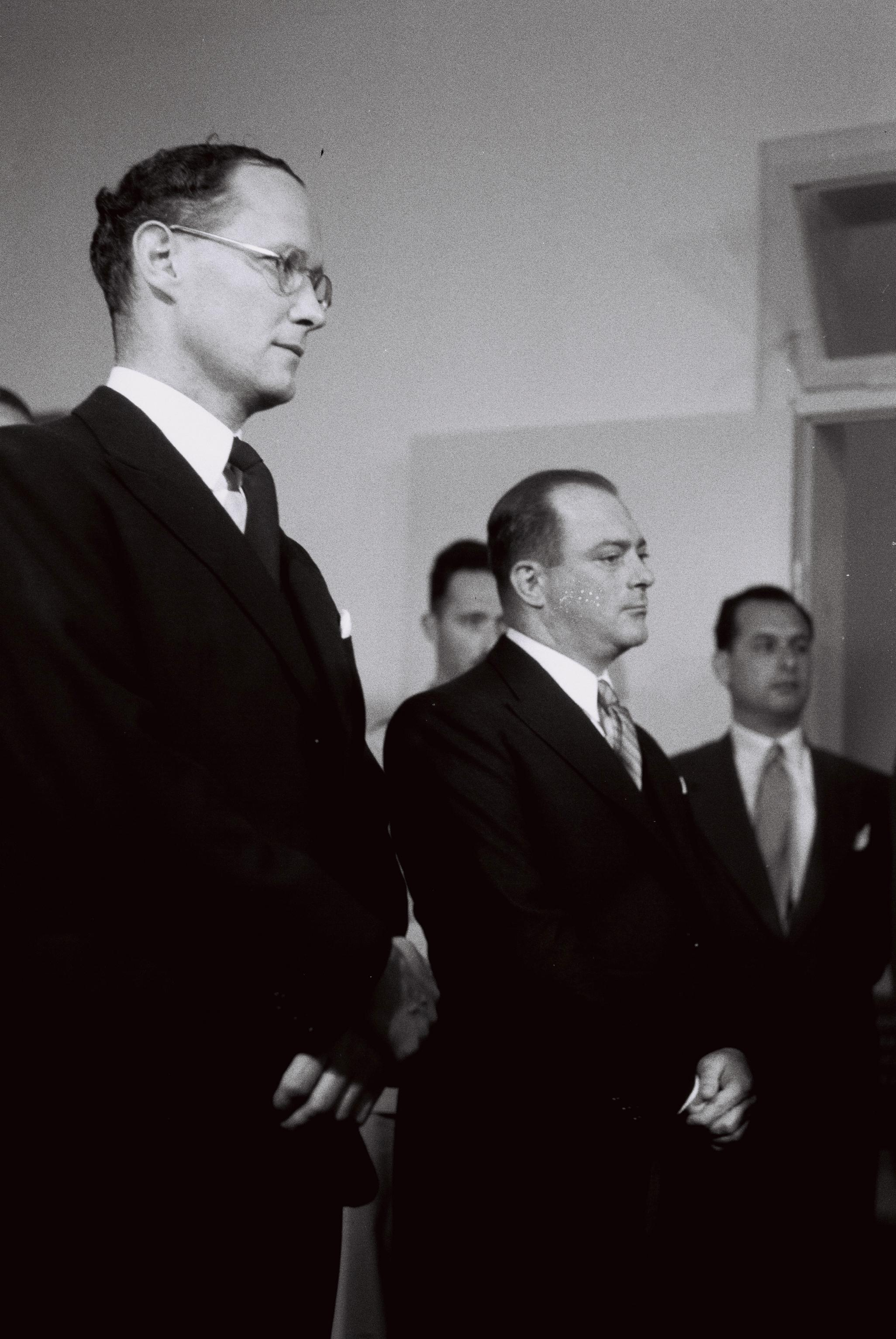
- Crowe, left, attending the presentation of credentials of British min., HaKirya

British Permanent Representative to the United Nations
- In office 1970–1973

British High Commissioner to Canada
- In office 1968–1970

Ambassador Extraordinary and Plenipotentiary at Jedda
- In office 1963–1964

Deputy British Permanent Representative to the United Nations
- In office 1961–1963

British Chargé d'affaires to the United Arab Republic
- In office 1959–1961

Personal details
- Born: 7 September 1913 Yokohama, Japan
- Died: 19 July 1989 (aged 75)
- Spouse: Bettina Lum
- Parent: Edward Crowe (father)
- Relatives: Bertha Lum (mother-in-law); Antonio Riva (brother-in-law)
- Education: Oriel College, Oxford

Sir Colin Tradescant Crowe GCMG (7 September 1913 – 19 July 1989) was a British diplomat who was stationed in Egypt at a critical period, and afterwards was ambassador to Saudi Arabia, high commissioner to Canada and permanent representative at the United Nations.

== Early life and education ==
Colin Tradescant Crowe was born in Yokohama, Japan, where his father, Edward Crowe (later Sir Edward), also a diplomat, was commercial attaché at the British Embassy. Crowe was educated at Stowe School and earned a first-class degree in modern history from Oriel College, Oxford.

== Career ==
Crowe joined the Diplomatic Service and served as in Peking 1936–1938 and at Shanghai 1938–1940. After postings in Washington, D.C., Paris and Tel Aviv he served again in Peking (Beijing) 1950–1953. Chinese 'volunteers' were fighting the Korean War and, although Britain had recognised the People's Republic of China, the communists harassed British diplomats. Crowe's brother-in-law, Antonio Riva, was executed in August 1951 on a charge of conspiring to murder chairman Mao Zedong.

Crowe was appointed as prospective chargé d'affaires in Cairo in 1957. Diplomatic relations had ceased during the Suez Crisis and Crowe was unable to proceed to Cairo until 1959. His task was to overcome Egyptian suspicion and the after-effects of the Suez war so as to restore normal relations. He succeeded, and ambassadors were exchanged in 1961.

Universally liked and respected by all with whom he came in contact, he skilfully addressed the problems ... A man of less genuine modesty would have made more of what had been a major diplomatic triumph.

— Obituary, The Times, London, 24 July 1989, page 18

Crowe moved on to be deputy Permanent Representative to the United Nations in New York City. In 1963 he was appointed Ambassador to Saudi Arabia, the first since the Suez crisis. After a sabbatical year as supernumerary fellow of St Antony's College, Oxford 1964–1965 he served as Chief of Administration, HM Diplomatic Service, 1965–1968; High Commissioner to Canada 1968–1970; and Permanent Representative to the United Nations 1970–1973.

Crowe was neither an outstanding UN rhetorician nor an incisive drafter of telegrams and dispatches. His strength lay in the palpable decency of his character and the commonsensical soundness of his judgement. Humorous, patient, and considerate, he got the best out of his staff, who also enjoyed his explosions of fury at pomposity, pretentiousness and time-serving. His foreign interlocutors rapidly became friends whether they agreed or disagreed on policies. There cannot have been many senior Bntish diplomats in this century who were so widely popular and respected in so many different circles.

— Obituary, The Times, London, 24 July 1989, page 18

After retiring from the Diplomatic Service, Sir Colin Crowe was a director of Grindlays Bank 1976–1984, chairman of the Council of Cheltenham Ladies College 1974–1986, and chairman of the Marshall Aid Commemoration Commission 1973–1985.

== Personal life ==
In 1938, while Crowe was stationed in Peking, Colin Crowe married Bettina Lum, nicknamed Peter, who as the daughter of American missionary Burt Francis Lum and artist Bertha Lum had lived in China since 1922. She became an author and an expert on China. They had no children.

== Honours ==
Colin Crowe was appointed CMG in 1956, knighted KCMG in the Queen's Birthday Honours of 1963 on his appointment to Saudi Arabia, and promoted GCMG in the Queen's Birthday Honours of 1973.

== Additional sources ==
- Tomes, Jason (September 2004). "Colin Crowe" (subscription required). Oxford Dictionary of National Biography (online ed.). Oxford University Press. doi:10.1093/ref:odnb/70377. (Subscription, Wikipedia Library access or UK public library membership required.)
- CROWE, Sir Colin Tradescant, Who Was Who, A & C Black, 1920–2008; online ed., Oxford University Press, Dec 2007, accessed 19 July 2012
- Sir Colin Crowe (obituary), The Times, London, 24 July 1989, page 18

Diplomatic posts
Vacant Suez Crisis Title last held by Sir Humphrey Trevelyan as Ambassador to Egypt	British Chargé d'affaires to the United Arab Republic; 1959–1961	Succeeded by Sir Harold Beeley as Ambassador to the United Arab Republic
Preceded by Sir Harold Beeley	Deputy British Permanent Representative to the United Nations; 1961–1963	Succeeded by Sir Roger Jackling
Vacant Suez Crisis Title last held by Sir Roderick Parkes as Ambassador	Ambassador Extraordinary and Plenipotentiary at Jedda; 1963–1964	Succeeded by Morgan Man
Preceded by Sir Henry Lintott	British High Commissioner to Canada; 1968–1970	Succeeded by Sir Peter Hayman
Preceded by Lord Caradon	British Permanent Representative to the United Nations; 1970–1973	Succeeded by Sir Donald Maitland
