= Persian Gulf Residency =

Colonial subdivision of the British-Indian Empire

- 1822–1971
- Flag of the East India Company in use until 1874

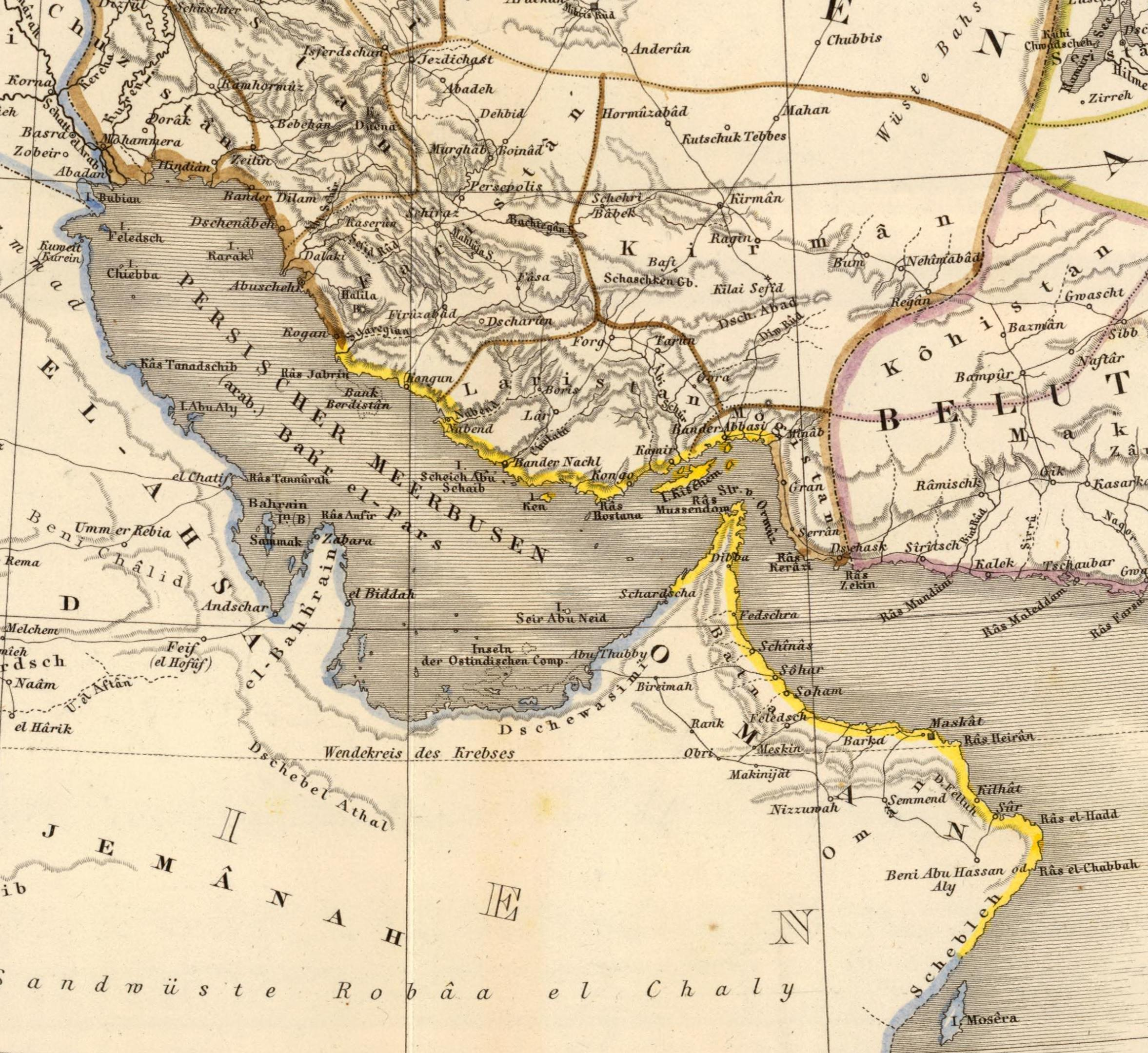
- Status: Residency of the East India Company (1822–1858); Residency of the British Indian Empire (1858–1947); Group of British protectorates (1947–1971)
- Capital: Bushehr (1822–1946); Manama (1946–1971)
- Official languages: English
- Common languages: Arabic, Persian
- Religion: Islam
- States under Persian Gulf Resident: Bushehr (1822–1946); Trucial States (1820–1971); Bahrain (1861–1971); Muscat and Oman (1892–1962); Sheikhdom of Kuwait (1899–1961); Qatar (1916–1971)
- Chief Resident
  - 1822–1823 (first): John Macleod
  - 1970–1971 (last): Geoffrey Arthur
- History
  - Established by the EIC: 1822
  - General Maritime Treaty: 1820
  - Government of India Act: 1858
  - Transfer from Government of India to Foreign Office: 1947
  - Termination of the British protectorates: 1971
- Currency: Indian rupee (1822–1959); Gulf rupee (1959–1966); Various (1966–1971)

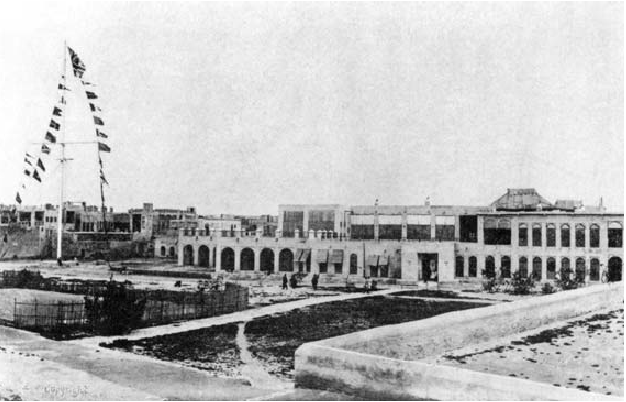
British Residency of the Persian Gulf headquarters in Bushehr in 1902.

The Persian Gulf Residency was a subdivision of the British Empire from 1822 until 1971, whereby the United Kingdom maintained varying degrees of political and economic control over several states in the Persian Gulf, including what is today known as the United Arab Emirates (formerly called the "Trucial States") and at various times southern portions of Iran, Bahrain, Kuwait, Oman, and Qatar.

== Historical background until 1900 ==
British interest in the Persian Gulf originated in the sixteenth century and steadily increased as British India's importance rose in the imperial and economic system of the eighteenth and nineteenth centuries. In the beginning, the agenda was primarily commercial. Realizing the region's significance, the English fleet supported the Persian emperor Abbas I in expelling the Portuguese from Hormuz Island in 1622. In return, the East India Company was permitted to establish a trading post in the coastal city of Bandar Abbas, which became their principal port in the Persian Gulf. Empowered by the charter of Charles II in 1661, the company was responsible for conducting British foreign policy in the Persian Gulf, as well as concluding various treaties, agreements and engagements with Persian Gulf states in its capacity as the Crown's regional agent.

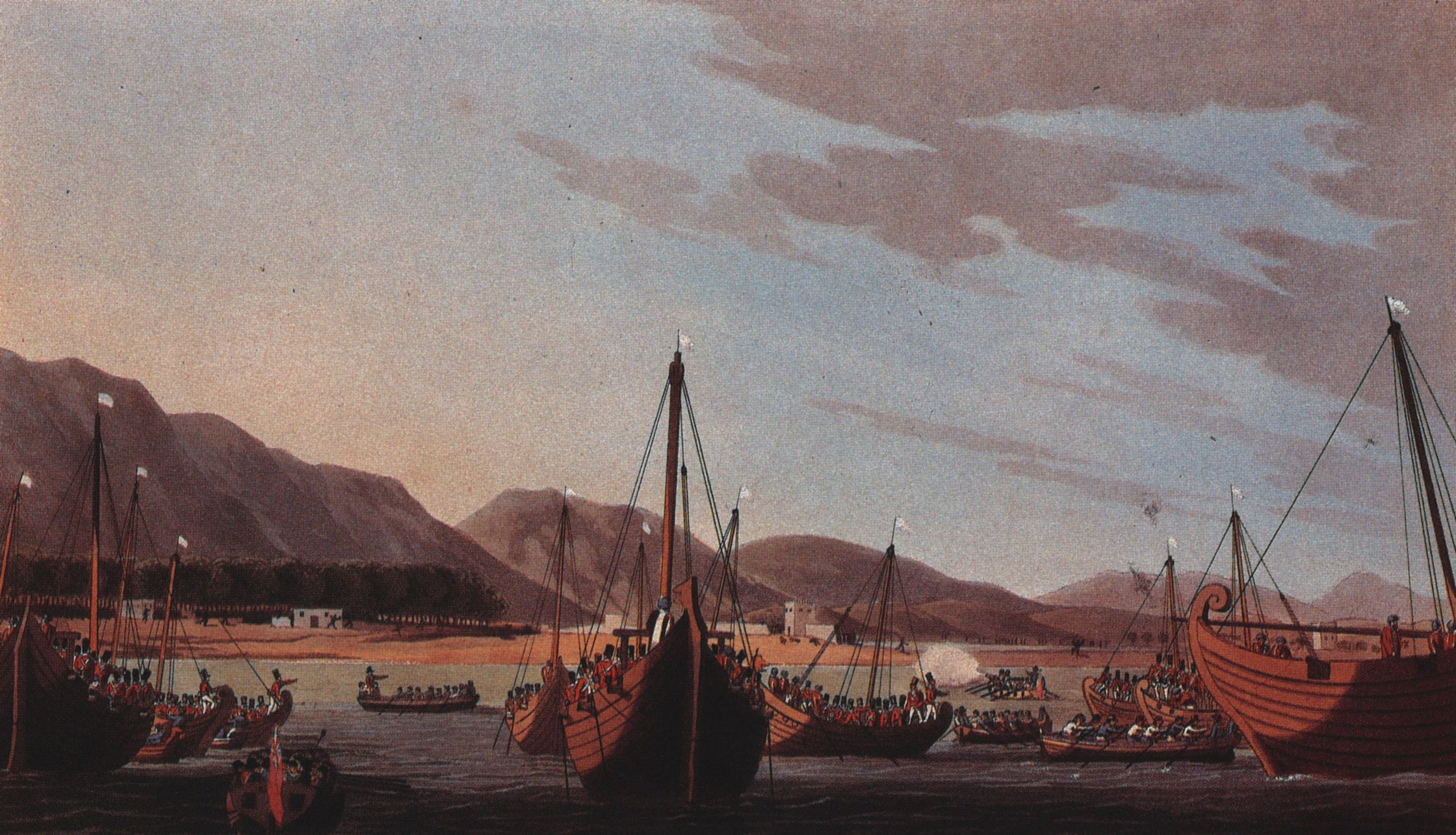
The British Expeditionary Force of 1809 landing troops at Ras Al Khaimah

In 1763, the British East India Company established a residency at Bushehr, on the Persian side of the Gulf, which secured the monopoly of the import of woolen goods into Persia to the exclusion of other European nations: this was followed by another residency in Basra several years later. The arrival of a large French mission in Persia in 1807 under General Gardane galvanized the British, both in London and Calcutta. They responded by sending a mission under Sir Harford Jones, which resulted in establishing the Preliminary Treaty of Friendship and Alliance with the Shah in 1809. Despite being modified during subsequent negotiations, this treaty provided the framework within which Anglo–Persian foreign relations operated for the next half century. Britain appointed Harford Jones as their first resident envoy to the Persian court in 1808. Until the appointment of Charles Alison as Minister in Tehran in 1860, the envoy and his staff were, with rare exceptions, almost exclusively recruited from the East India Company.

In the absence of formal diplomatic relations, the political resident conducted all necessary negotiations with Persian authorities and was described by Sir George Curzon as "the Uncrowned King of the Persian Gulf." Whether Persia liked it or not, the political resident had naval forces at his disposal to suppress piracy, slave trading, and gun running, and to enforce quarantine regulations; he also could, and did, put landing parties and punitive expeditions ashore on the Persia coast. In 1822, the Bushehr and Basra residencies were combined, with Bushehr serving as headquarters for the new position of "British Resident for the Persian Gulf." A chief political resident was the chief executive officer of the political unit, and he was subordinate to the Governor of Bombay until 1873 and the Governor-General of India until 1947, when India became independent. In 1858, the East India Company's de facto control was transferred to the UK government's India Office, which assumed authority for British foreign policy with Persian Gulf states. This responsibility went to the UK Foreign Office on 1 April 1947.

== The Trucial States ==
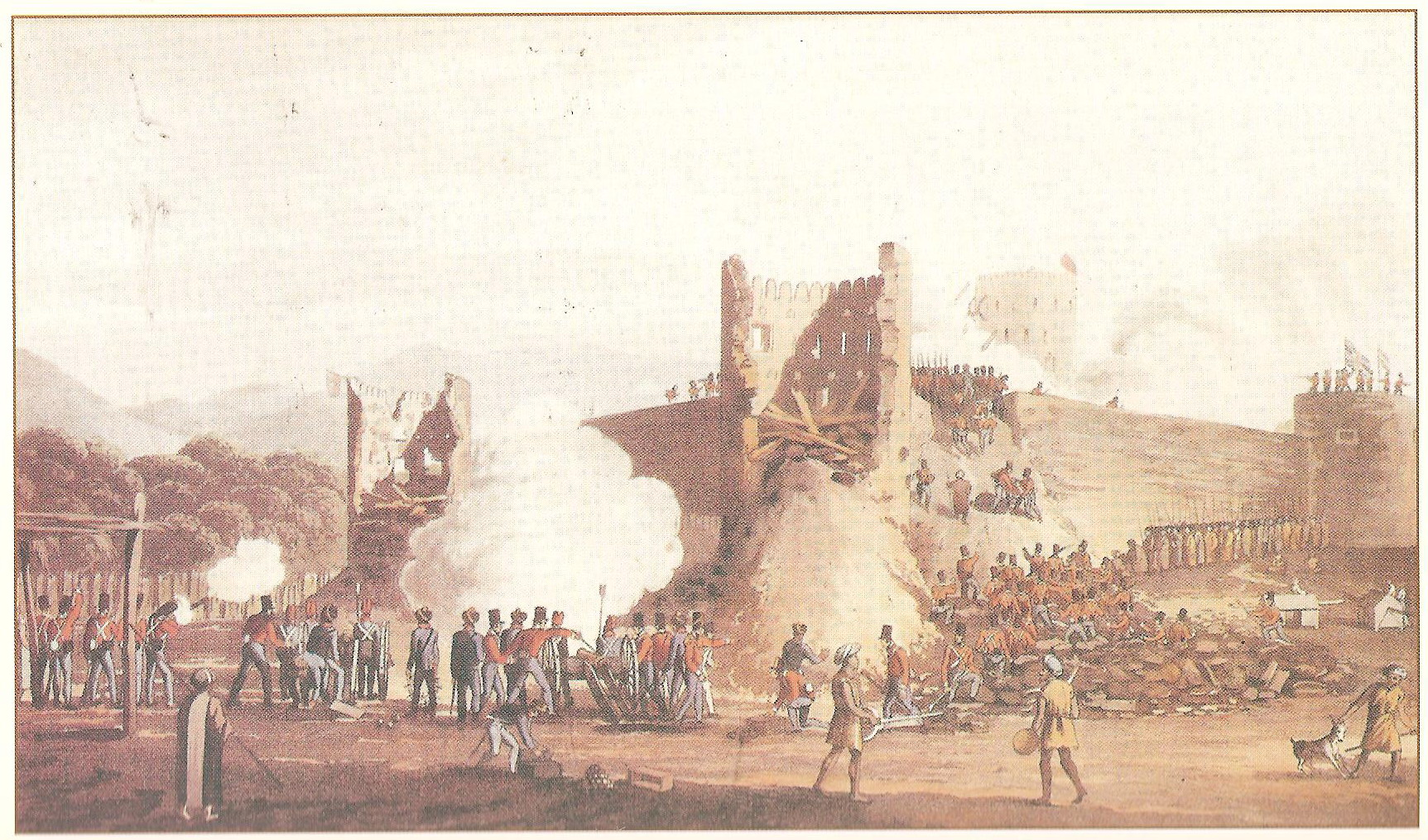
Ras Al Khaimah fell to British forces on 9 December 1819

British activity in the Persian Gulf was primarily commercial. Thus, the British Raj was slow to take action in protecting British and Indian shipping against raids from Qawasim pirates. By 1817, the Qawasim were spreading terror along the Indian coast to within 70 miles of Bombay. This threat generated a British military expedition in 1819, which crushed the Qawasim confederation and resulted in ratification of the General Maritime Treaty on 5 January 1820. Through extension and modification, this treaty formed the basis of British policy in the Persian Gulf for a century and half. The ruler of Bahrain as well as sheikhs along the northern coast of Oman pledged to maintain peace between their tribes and Britain and accepted clauses prohibiting slavery and cruel treatment of prisoners. The treaty further stipulated that the ships of maritime tribes would be freely admitted at British ports. While the treaty served British interests, because it was sensibly magnanimous and aimed at securing all parties' interests, it effectively ended piracy in the Persian Gulf. Articles 6 and 10 authorized the British Residency in the Persian Gulf to act as maritime police to administer the treaty's conditions and resolve tribal disputes. Article 7 condemned piracy among Arab tribes and implied a British obligation to maintain peace. The Trucial system took explicit form in 1835, when raids by Bani Yas tribesmen –rivals of the Qawasim– led to a British-imposed truce during the summer pearling season. The truce was made year-long in 1838 and renewed annually until 1843 when it was extended for ten years.

The Trucial system received formal permanency with the 1853 Perpetual Maritime Truce. The British policy of non-involvement in the internal affairs of the Trucial sheikhs was abandoned with passage of the Exclusive Agreement in March 1892. This agreement prohibited the Trucial rulers from yielding territorial sovereignty without British consent. Britain, moreover, assumed responsibility for foreign relations and thus, by implication, their protection. This treaty marked Britain's shift from commercial to strategic priorities and formed the diplomatic pillar of British authority in the Trucial States.

== Post-World War I ==
In the years following World War I, the British continuously curtailed the Trucial sheikhs' capacity to act independently. This was partially a result of Britain shifting attention away from Iran, where Reza Shah's nationalist assertion of power undercut their hegemony. It also reflected growing commercial and imperial communications interests, such as air route facilities. For example, according to agreements concluded in February 1922, the Trucial sheikhs pledged not to allow the exploitation of oil resources in their territories except by "persons appointed by the British government". Even more restrictive was the ultimatum issued by the political resident in 1937 requiring Trucial states to do business exclusively with Petroleum Concessions Ltd, a wholly owned subsidiary of the London-based Iraq Petroleum Company, which was itself partly owned by the Anglo-Iranian Oil Company. Instead of providing for higher demand for and supply of oil (Britain then had adequate supply), this ultimatum was designed to block other parties out of the economic and political affairs of the Trucial States.

In 1946, the Persian Gulf residency relocated to a new base in Bahrain. However, while Reza Shah succeeded in removing Britain from Iranian territory, his efforts to curtail their role in the Iranian oil industry backfired, and led to an extension of the concession operated by the Anglo-Iranian Oil Company. From their new base in Bahrain, the British resident directed other political agents in Bahrain, Kuwait, Qatar, the Trucial States and Oman until those regions became independent.

Indian independence saw the responsibility for the administration of the Gulf passed from the Indian Government in Bombay to the Foreign Office in London and this demanded a more 'hands on' approach to issues such as slavery and gun running, particularly in the Trucial States, where in 1949 the role of 'Native Agent' – the Residency Agent in Sharjah – was terminated and a British Political Agency was opened in Dubai in 1954.

== Duties of the Residency ==
On 1 April 1947, the British political residency came under the authority of the Foreign Office, 'graded' as an ambassador in the Persian Gulf. The political resident fulfilled his obligations by using a network of representatives known as political agents, operating in Bahrain, Qatar, Dubai and Abu Dhabi. Additionally, political officers were retained for the remaining Trucial states, acting under the British Agency at Dubai. Foreign relations in Muscat were conducted by a Consul-General, who was also, administratively, answerable to the resident in Bahrain. Through his political agents the resident preserved close connections with Persian Gulf rulers – simultaneously protecting their political and economic interests and the British government's on the basis of established treaties and agreements. According to Rupert Hay, the sheikhs enjoyed control over internal affairs, with Britain "ordinarily only exercises control in matters involving negotiations or the possibility of complications with foreign powers, such as civil aviation, posts and telegraphs." However, Hay added that "constant advice and encouragement are... offered to various rulers regarding improvement of their administrations and development of their resources, mostly in an informal manner".

The resident also administered British extraterritorial jurisdiction, which had been exercised in certain Persian Gulf territories since 1925. Extraterritorial jurisdiction was ceded to Britain in the 19th century by virtue of informal agreements with various rulers. In Muscat it was based on formal agreements that were renewed periodically. Extraterritorial jurisdiction was originally applied to all resident classes in Persian Gulf states, but was later limited to British subjects, Commonwealth nationals and non-Muslim foreigners. Britain relinquished extraterritorial jurisdiction in Kuwait on 4 May 1961, transferring jurisdiction over all classes of foreigners to Kuwaiti courts. British extraterritorial jurisdiction in the Persian Gulf was implemented in accordance with the British Foreign Jurisdiction Acts of 1890–1913, which empowered the Crown to establish courts and legislate for the categories of persons subject to jurisdiction by means of Orders in Council.

Regarding the resident's role in concluding concession agreements between rulers and foreign oil companies, Hay says: 'The oil companies naturally bulk largely in the political resident's portfolio. He has to closely watch all negotiations for new agreements or the amendment of existing agreements and ensure that nothing is decided which will seriously affect the position or the rulers of the British government...' He also refers to what he terms political agreements, to which, he says "oil companies' are all bound... with the British government... in addition to their concession agreements with the rulers... One of the main objects of these, is to ensure that their relations with the rulers in all matters of importance are conducted through, or with, the knowledge of British political officers."

== Protectorates under the Residency ==
- Trucial States, precursor of the United Arab Emirates (1820–1971)
- Bahrain (1861–1971)
- Muscat and Oman (limited protectorate and intervention in internal affairs, 1892–1971)
- Kuwait (1899–1961)
- Qatar (1916–1971)

== Chronology: 1763–1971 ==
- 1763: British Residency established at Bushehr in Persia by the British East India Company.
- 1798: Sultan of Muscat signed a treaty giving the British East India Company exclusive trading rights, in return for an annual British stipend.
- 1809: Preliminary Treaty of Friendship and Alliance is concluded between Britain and the shah. While modified in subsequent negotiations (Definitive Treaty of Friendship and Alliance, 1812; Treaty of Tehran, 1814), remained the framework of Anglo–Persian relations over the next half century.
- 8 Jan 1820 – 15 March 1820: General Maritime Treaty with Britain and sheikhs in the "Trucial Coast States" and Bahrain, abolishing slave trade and forbidding piracy and warfare between the states (This last point was never fully implemented).
- 1822: Persian Gulf residency established by Britain.
- 1822–1873: Subordinated to the Governor of Bombay.
- 1835: Treaty with the Trucial States, installing a truce of six months a year, during the pearling season.
- 1843: Treaty renews the treaty of 1835 for ten years.
- 1853: Treaty with Trucial States, renewing the treaty of 1835 for an unlimited time period.
- 1856–1857: Anglo-Persian War and proclamation of jihad by Nasereddin Shah.
- 1858: Act of 1858 is passed, transferring powers of the East India Company to the British crown.
- 1861: Protectorate treaty with Bahrain (completed by treaties of 2 December 1880 and 1892).
- 1873–1947: Subordinate to Governor-General of India (from 1946 resident in Bahrain).
- 1873: Trucial States start being administered by the British.
- 8 Mar 1892 – 1 December 1971: Informal protectorate with Muscat and Oman, and a formal protectorate with the Trucial States. This new agreement includes the sheikhs giving the British effective control over foreign policy: British offer military protection in return.
- 1899: Protectorate treaty with Kuwait (completed 3 November 1914).
- 1906: Constitutional Revolution in Persia.
- 3 Nov 1916: Protectorate treaty with Qatar.
- 1920: Treaty of Seeb is signed recognizing the independence of the Imamate of Oman.
- 1939: British Political Officer established in the Trucial States at Sharjah.
- 1946: Headquarters of the Persian Gulf residency is moved from Bushehr to Manama.
- 1947: With Indian independence imminent, the Persian Gulf Residency is transferred to the control of the British Foreign Office.
- 1948: First full time British Political Agent in the Trucial States.
- 1954: British Political Agency in the Trucial States transferred to Dubai.
- 1961: Termination of protectorate over Kuwait and its complete independence.
- 1962: Great Britain declares Muscat and Oman an independent nation.
- Jan 1968: Britain announces its decision to withdraw from the Persian Gulf, including the Trucial States, by 1971.
- 16 Dec 1971: Termination of British protectorate and military presence in the Persian Gulf.

== Political agents ==
=== Agents ===
- 1763–1812: ?
- c. 1798: Mirza Mahdi Ali Khan
- c. 1810: Hankey Smith
- 1812–1822: William Bruce (acting to 1813)

=== Chief political residents of the Persian Gulf for Bahrain, Kuwait, Oman, Qatar, and the Trucial States ===
- 1822–1823: John Macleod
- 1823–1827: Ephraim Gerrish Stannus
- 1827–1831: David Wilson
- 1831–1835: David Alexander Blane
- 1835–1838: James Morrison
- 1838–1852: Samuel Hennell
- 1852–1856: Arnold Burrowes Kemball
- 1856–1862: James Felix Jones
- 1862: Herbert Frederick Disbrowe (acting)
- 1862–1872: Lewis Pelly
- 1872–1891: Edward Charles Ross
- 1891–1893: Adelbert Cecil Talbot
- 1893: Stuart Hill Godfrey (acting)
- 1893: James Hayes Sadler (1st time)(acting)
- 1893: James Adair Crawford (acting)
- 1893–1894: James Hayes Sadler (2nd time)(acting)
- 1894–1897: Frederick Alexander Wilson
- 1897–1900: Malcolm John Meade
- 1900–1904: Charles Arnold Kemball (acting)
- 1904–1920: Percy Zachariah Cox

- Acting for Cox -
- 1913–1914: John Gordon Lorimer
- 1914: Richard Lockinton Birdwood
- 1914: Stuart George Knox (1st time)
- 1915: Stuart George Knox (2nd time)
- 1915–1917: Arthur Prescott Trevor (1st time)
- 1917–1919: John Hugo Bill
- 1919: Cecil Hamilton Gabriel
- 1919–1920: Arthur Prescott Trevor (2nd time)

- 1920: Arnold Talbot Wilson (acting)
- 1920–1924: Arthur Prescott Trevor
- 1924–1927: Francis Bellville Prideaux
- 1927–1928: Lionel Berkeley Holt Haworth
- 1928–1929: Frederick William Johnston
- 1929: Cyril Charles Johnson Barrett (acting)
- 1929–1932: Hugh Vincent Biscoe
- 1932–1939: Trenchard Craven William Fowle
- 1939–1946: Charles Geoffrey Prior
- 1946–1953: Rupert Hay (from 1952, Sir Rupert)
- 1953–1958: Bernard Burrows (from 1955, Sir Bernard)
- 1958–1961: Sir George Humphrey Middleton
- 1961–1966: Sir William Henry Tucker Luce
- 1966–1970: Sir Robert Stewart Crawford
- 1970–15 August 1971: Sir Geoffrey Arthur

== People mentioned in the Residency Correspondence ==
In the correspondence of the Persian Gulf Residency, archived at the India Office Records and digitised by the Qatar Digital Library, many regional figures are mentioned, including:

- Shaikh Abdoolla Russool Khan
- Rahma bin Jaber
- Abdoolla bin Ahmed

== See also ==
- Bahrain province
- Pax Britannica

== Notes ==
=== References ===
- Cronin, Stephanie (2003). The Making of Modern Iran: State and Society under Riza Shah, 1921–1941. Routledge. ISBN 9780415302845.
- Curzon, George (1892). Persia and the Persian Question. Vol. 2. London: Longmans, Green, and Co.
- Hay, Rupert (1959). The Persian Gulf States. With a foreword by E. M. Eller. Washington DC: Middle East Institute.
- Henige, David P. (1970). Colonial Governors from the Fifteenth Century to the Present.
- Peck, Malcolm C. (1986). United Arab Emirates: a Venture in Unity. Nations of the Contemporary Middle East. Westview. ISBN 9780865311886.
- Ramazani, Rouhollah K. (1975). Iran's Foreign Policy, 1941–1973. Charlottesville VA: University Press of Virginia. ISBN 9780813905945.
