= Edward Crowe =

British diplomat

Commercial Counsellor at the British Embassy in Tokyo
- In office 1918–1925

Commercial Attaché at the British Embassy in Tokyo
- In office 1906–1918

British Acting Consul in Tamsui District
- In office 1904–?

British Vice-Consul in Kobe
- In office 1903–1904

British Vice-Consul in Yokohama
- In office 1901–1903

Personal details
- Born: 20 August 1877; Zakynthos, Greece
- Died: 8 March 1960 (aged 82); Cairo, Egypt
- Children: Colin Crowe

Sir Edward Thomas Frederick Crowe KCMG (20 August 1877 – 8 March 1960) was a senior British civil servant and diplomat.

== Biography ==
Born on the Greek island of Zakynthos on 20 August 1877, Edward Crowe was educated at Bedford School. In 1897 he joined the Diplomatic Service and was appointed as a student interpreter in Japan. By 1901, he had been promoted to be Vice-Consul at the British Consulate in Yokohama. In 1903 he was appointed Vice-Consul at the British Consulate in Kobe and, in 1904, he was appointed Acting Consul at the British Consulate in Tamsui District. Between 1906 and 1918 he was Commercial Attaché at the British Embassy in Tokyo and, between 1918 and 1925, he was Commercial Counsellor at the British Embassy in Tokyo. Between 1925 and 1928 he was seconded to the Civil Service as Director of the Foreign Division of the Department for Overseas Trade and, between 1928 and 1937, he was Comptroller-General of the Department for Overseas Trade.

Sir Edward Crowe was invested as a Commander of the Order of St Michael and St George in 1911, as a Knight Bachelor in 1922, and as a Knight Commander of the Order of St Michael and St George in 1930. He retired from the Civil Service in 1937, and was President of the Royal Society of Arts between 1941 and 1943. He died in Cairo, on 8 March 1960, aged 82, whilst visiting his son, Sir Colin Crowe, who was British Chargé d'Affaires in Egypt at the time of his father's death.
