= List of ambassadors of the United Kingdom to the Democratic Republic of Congo =

The ambassador of the United Kingdom to the Democratic Republic of the Congo is the United Kingdom's foremost diplomatic representative in the Democratic Republic of the Congo (DRC) formerly Zaire, and head of the UK's diplomatic mission in Kinshasa.

From 1968 to 1987, and since 1991, the British ambassador to the DRC has also been non-resident ambassador to the neighbouring Republic of Congo.

== List of heads of mission ==
=== Ambassadors extraordinary and plenipotentiary ===
- 1960–1961: Ian Dixon Scott
- 1961–1963: Derek Riches
- 1963–1965: Michael Rose
- 1965–1969: John Cotton
- 1969–1971: Paul Wright
- 1971–1974: Mark Allen
- 1974–1977: Richard Stratton
- 1977–1980: Alan Donald
- 1980–1983: John Snodgrass
- 1983–1984: Nicholas Bayne
- 1985–1987: Patrick Eyers
- 1987–1991: Robert Cormack
- 1991–1992: Roger Westbrook
- 1992–1996: No ambassador
- 1996–1998: Marcus Hope
- 1998–2000: Douglas Scrafton
- 2000–2004: James Atkinson
- 2004–2007: Andrew Sparkes
- 2007–2009: Nicholas Kay
- 2010–2013: Neil Wigan
- 2013–2014: Diane Corner
- 2014–2015: Timothy Morris (temporary)
- 2015–2017: Graham Zebedee
- 2017–2020: John Murton
- 2020–2023: Emily Maltman
- 2023–2026: Alyson King
- 2026--Present: Zoe Ware
