= Derek Riches =

British diplomat (1912–1997)

Sir Derek Riches KCMG

British Ambassador to Lebanon
- In office 1963–1967
- Preceded by: Sir Moore Crosthwaite
- Succeeded by: Cecil King

British Ambassador to the Democratic Republic of Congo
- In office 1961–1963
- Preceded by: Ian Dixon Scott
- Succeeded by: Michael Rose

British Ambassador to Libya
- In office 1959–1961
- Preceded by: Walter Graham
- Succeeded by: Andrew Stewart

Personal details
- Born: 26 July 1912
- Died: 1 October 1997 (aged 85)
- Children: 1
- Education: University College London
- Occupation: Diplomat

Sir Derek Martin Hurry Riches (26 July 1912 – 1 October 1997) was a British diplomat who served as ambassador to Libya from 1959 to 1961; ambassador to the Democratic Republic of Congo from 1961 to 1963; and ambassador to Lebanon from 1963 to 1967.

== Early life and education ==
Riches was born on 26 July 1912 in Caerphilly, Wales, the son of Claud Riches, a senior banker and Flora Martin. He was educated at University College School, Hampstead and University College London where he took a degree in economics.

== Career ==
Riches joined the Levant Consular Service in 1934, and was appointed a probationer vice-consul at Beirut. After postings in Cairo and Ethiopia where he was attached to the Allied Military Government in Occupied Territories, he worked at the Foreign Office where he was promoted to consul serving in the Foreign Office in 1945. He then served at Kabul in 1948 and as consul at Jeddah in 1951 and chargé d’affaires there in 1952. After serving as trade commissioner at Khartoum in 1953, he was sent on furlough to the Imperial Defence College in 1955, before he returned later that year to the Foreign Office, first as counsellor and head of the Eastern Department and then head of the Arabian Department.

Riches served as ambassador to Libya from 1959 to 1961. He was then ambassador to the Democratic Republic of Congo from 1961 to 1963 arriving during the turmoil of the Congo Crisis after independence from Belgium. He then served as ambassador to Lebanon from 1963 until 1967 when he was expelled from the country as Arab leaders reacted to the Israeli victory in the Six-Day War accusing the US and UK of providing assistance to Israel. Six months later, he retired from the service at the age of only 55 to the surprise of many of his colleagues.

In retirement Riches was foreign affairs adviser at the Conservative Central Office and was on the editorial board of the Journal of the Royal Society of Asian Affairs.

== Personal life and death ==
Riches married American Helen Barkley Hayes in 1942 and they had a daughter.

Riches died on 1 October 1997, aged 85.

== Honours ==
Riches was appointed Companion of the Order of St Michael and St George (CMG) in the 1958 New Years Honours, and promoted to Knight Commander (KCMG) in the 1963 New Year Honours.

== See also ==
- Lebanon–United Kingdom relations
- Democratic Republic of the Congo–United Kingdom relations
- Libya–United Kingdom relations

Diplomatic posts
Preceded by Walter Graham	British Ambassador to Libya; 1959–1961	Succeeded by Andrew Stewart
Preceded by Ian Dixon Scott	British Ambassador to the Democratic Republic of Congo; 1961–1963	Succeeded by Michael Rose
Preceded by Sir Moore Crosthwaite	British Ambassador to Lebanon; 1963–1967	Succeeded by Cecil King
