= Peter Streams =

British diplomat

Peter John Streams CMG (born 8 March 1935) is a former British diplomat.

Streams was British Ambassador to Honduras from 1989 to 1991. He served as British Ambassador to Sudan from 1991 to 1994.

He was expelled in December 1993 after the Archbishop of Canterbury, George Carey, refused to visit the capital Khartoum during a tour of the country and spent much of his time in the rebel-held south. After talks in London hosted by Douglas Hogg, relations were eventually restored in 1995 with the appointment of Alan Goulty.

Diplomatic posts
Preceded by David Joy	British Ambassador to Honduras; 1989–1991	Succeeded by Patrick Morgan
Preceded by Allan Ramsay	British Ambassador to Sudan; 1991-1994	Succeeded by Alan Goulty

== Honours ==
- Companion of the Order of St Michael and St George (CMG) - 1986
