= List of ambassadors of the United Kingdom to Sudan =

His Majesty's Ambassador Extraordinary and Plenipotentiary at Khartoum is the United Kingdom's foremost diplomatic representative in the Republic of the Sudan.

== Heads of mission ==
=== Chargé d'affaires ===
- 1954–1956: Philip Adams
- 1994–1995: John Crane

=== Ambassadors extraordinary and plenipotentiary ===
- 1956–1961: Sir Edwin Chapman-Andrews
- 1961: Sir Roderick Parkes
- 1961–1965: Sir Ian Dixon Scott
- 1965–1966: Sir John Richmond
- 1966–1967: Sir Robert Fowler
- 1967–1968: Break in relations due to the Six-Day War
- 1968–1970: Sir Robert Fowler
- 1970–1974: Gordon Etherington-Smith
- 1974–1977: John Phillips
- 1977–1979: Derrick Carden
- 1979–1984: Richard Fyjis-Walker
- 1984–1986: Sir Alexander Stirling
- 1986–1990: John Beaven
- 1990–1991: Sir Allan Ramsay
- 1991–1994: Peter Streams
- 1995–1999: Alan Goulty
- 1999–2002: Richard Makepeace
- 2002–2005: Sir William Patey
- 2005–2007: Ian Cliff
- 2007–2010: Dame Rosalind Marsden
- 2010–2012: Nicholas Kay
- 2012–2015: Peter Tibber
- 2015–2018: Michael Aron
- 2018–2021 Irfan Siddiq
- 2021-2023 Giles Lever
- 2024– Richard Crowder
