= Ralph Champneys Williams =

British colonial governor

Sir Ralph Champneys Williams CMG
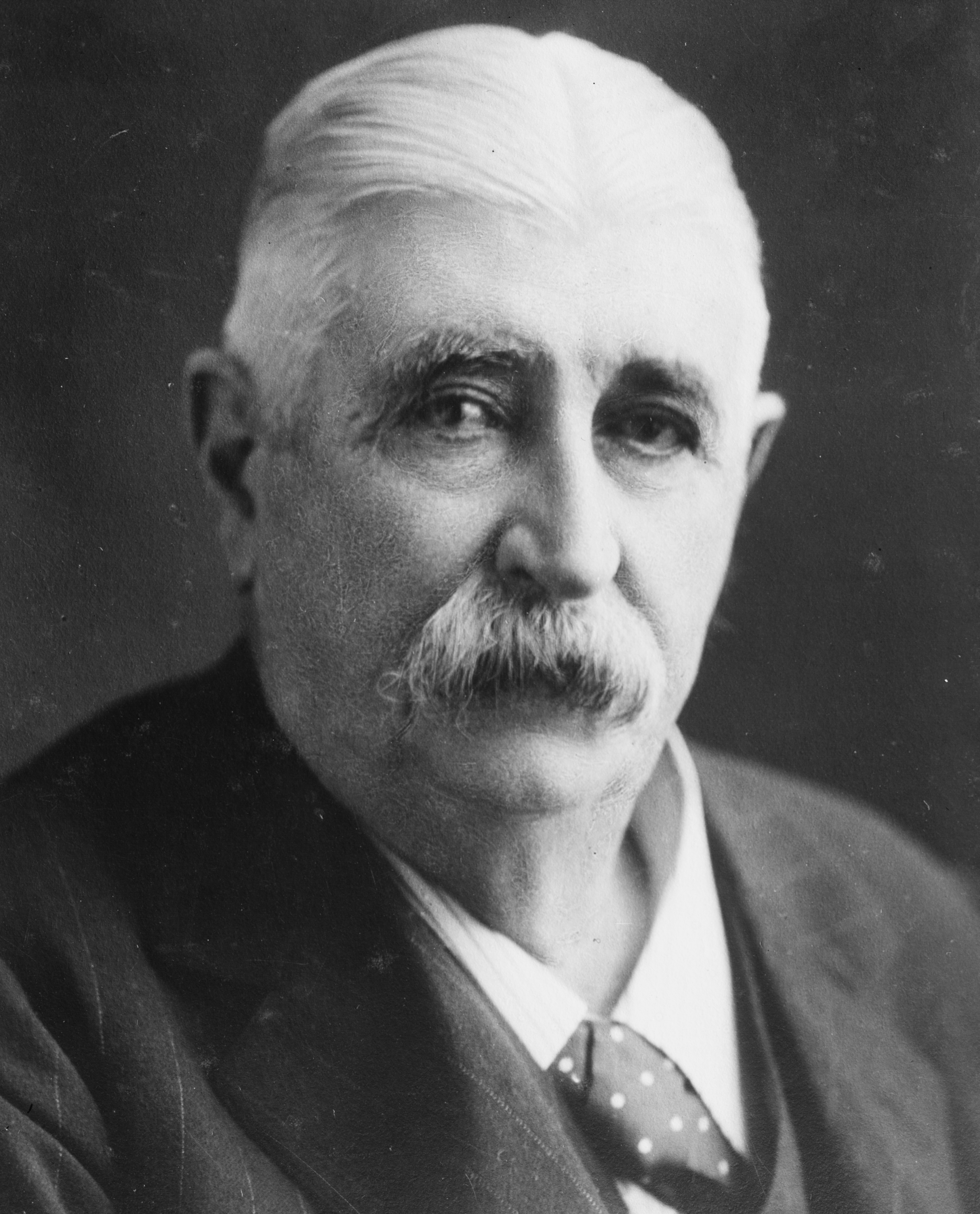

Governor of Newfoundland
- In office 1909–1913
- Monarchs: Edward VII; George V
- Prime Minister: Edward Morris, 1st Baron Morris
- Preceded by: Sir William MacGregor
- Succeeded by: Sir Walter Edward Davidson

Governor of the Windward Islands
- In office 1906–1909
- Monarch: Edward VII
- Preceded by: Sir Robert Baxter Llewelyn
- Succeeded by: Sir James Hayes Sadler

Resident Commissioner in Bechuanaland
- In office January 1901 – 1906
- Monarchs: Victoria; Edward VII
- Governor: The Lord Milner; The Earl of Selborne
- Preceded by: Sir Hamilton Goold-Adams
- Succeeded by: Francis William Panzera

Personal details
- Born: 9 March 1848 Holyhead, Anglesey; United Kingdom
- Died: 22 June 1927 (aged 79) London, United Kingdom

Viceregal styles of Sir Ralph Champneys Williams
- Reference style: His Excellency
- Spoken style: Your Excellency

Sir Ralph Champneys Williams, CMG (9 March 1848 – 22 June 1927) was a British colonial governor.

== Life and career ==
Williams was educated at The King's School, Chester, and at Rossall School. He joined the colonial service in 1884 and his first post was to Bechuanaland. He then served at Pretoria, South Africa, Gibraltar and Barbados, for which he was appointed a Companion of the Order of St Michael and St George (CMG) in the 1901 New Year Honours List. In early 1901 he returned to Bechuanaland as Resident Commissioner at the height of the Second Boer War. Williams was governor of the Windward Islands prior to his appointment as governor of Newfoundland in 1909.

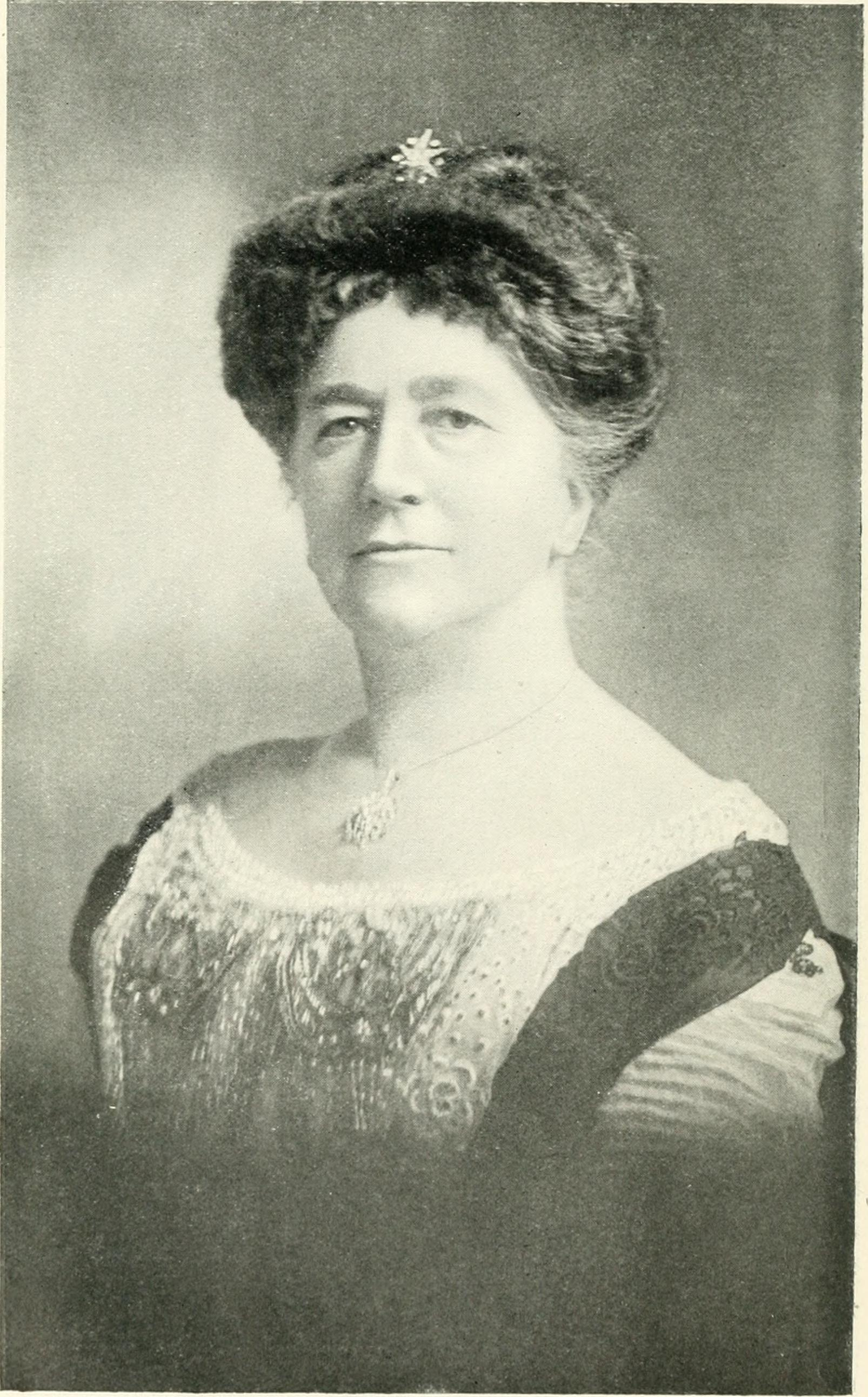
Mrs. Williams

While governor of Newfoundland Williams travelled throughout the island and the coast of Labrador. He was opposed to confederation with Canada and desired to maintain Newfoundland's individuality and hold fast Britain's last tie to North America. In 1913 he published his memoirs, How I Became a Governor.

== Legacy ==
Two Newfoundland towns were renamed for him: Salmon Cove, Trinity Bay, became Champneys, and Greenspond, White Bay, became Williamsport.

== See also ==
- Governors of Newfoundland
- List of commissioners of Bechuanaland
- Colonial Heads of the Windward Islands
- List of communities in Newfoundland and Labrador
- List of people of Newfoundland and Labrador

Government offices
| Preceded by Hamilton John Goold-Adams | Resident Commissioner of Bechuanaland; 1901–06 | Succeeded by Francis William Panzera |
| Preceded by Sir Robert Baxter Llewelyn | Governor of the Windward Islands; 1906–09 | Succeeded by Sir James Hayes Sadler |
| Preceded by Sir William Macgregor | Dominion Governor of Newfoundland; 1909–13 | Succeeded by Sir Walter Edward Davidson |
