= James Adair Crawford =

British colonial administrator

James Adair Crawford was a civil servant of the British Empire, in 1893 he served as the Chief political resident of the Persian Gulf (which included Bahrain, Kuwait, Oman, Qatar, and the Trucial States). Three years later in 1896 he also served as the acting Chief Commissioner of Balochistan, British India.

Political offices
Preceded by Sir James Hayes Sadler	Chief political resident of the Persian Gulf; 1893	Succeeded by Sir James Hayes Sadler
Preceded by Sir James Browne	Chief Commissioner of Balochistan; 1896	Succeeded by Sir Hugh Shakespear Barnes
