= Philip Adams =

British diplomat

Sir Philip George Doyne Adams KCMG (17 December 1915 – 14 October 2001) was a British career diplomat.

He was born in Wellington, New Zealand and was educated at Lancing College, Sussex, before going on to read Philosophy, Politics and Economics (PPE) at Christ Church, Oxford. He joined the Levant Consular Service in 1938 and was posted as a probationary Vice-Consul to Beirut.

During the Second World War he was an Intelligence Officer in the Australian Army. He took part in the invasion of Lebanon and Syria in 1941; however he was quickly recalled by the Foreign Office and spent the remaining years of the war in Cairo.

In 1954 he was made Chargé d'Affaires to Sudan in Khartoum and established the first British Embassy after Sudanese independence. Postings followed to Beirut and Vienna before he was appointed Consul-General in Chicago. It was during this period that he met and married Mary Elizabeth (Libby) Lawrence.

Adams’ first ambassadorial posting was in 1966 when he was made ambassador to Jordan. It was during his tenure that The Six Day War between Israel and the Arab states broke out. He returned to London in 1970 and held positions as Assistant Under-Secretary, Foreign and Commonwealth Office and Deputy Secretary, Cabinet Office 1971–72. He was appointed ambassador to Egypt in 1973 and acted as negotiator between the United States Administration and President Sadat during the Yom Kippur War.

He retired from the Diplomatic Service in 1975 and later took over as Director of the Ditchley Foundation. He died in London on 14 October 2001.

Diplomatic posts
Preceded by ?	British Chargé d'affaires to Sudan; 1954–1956	Succeeded by ?
Preceded by Sir Roderick Parkes	British Ambassador to Jordan; 1966–1970	Succeeded by John Phillips
Preceded by Sir Richard Beaumont	British Ambassador to Egypt; 1973–1975	Succeeded by Sir Willie Morris
