= Chris O'Connor (diplomat) =

British diplomat

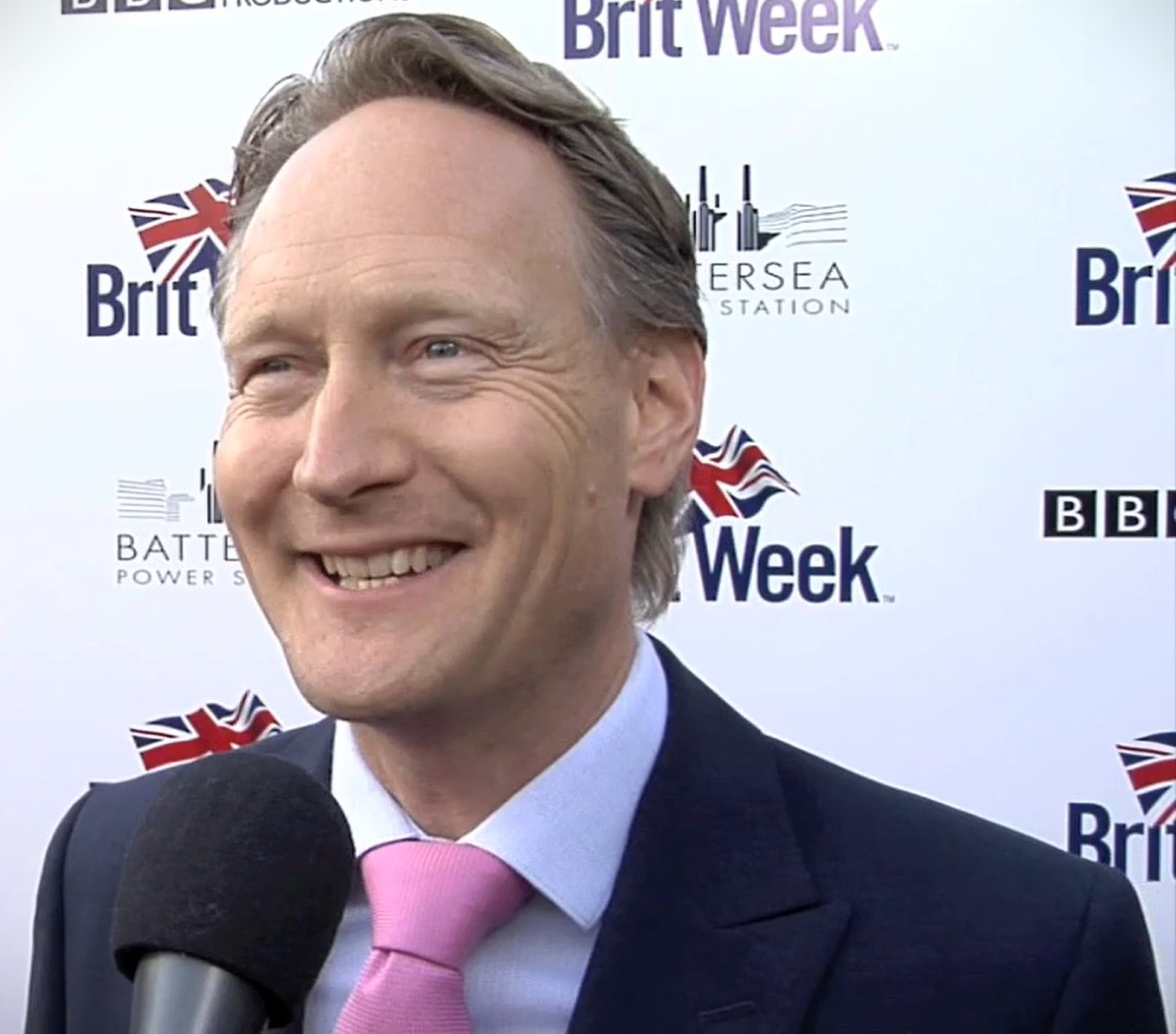
O'Connor in 2015

Christopher Paul O'Connor OBE (born 18 December 1968) is a British diplomat. He served as Consul-General in Los Angeles from 2013 to 2017. Prior to that he was Ambassador to Tunisia.

Born in Epsom, Surrey, O'Connor studied at Fitzwilliam College, Cambridge and Durham University. He was made an Officer of the Order of the British Empire in the 2012 New Year Honours.

Diplomatic posts
Preceded by Alan Goulty	British Ambassador to Tunisia; 2008-2013	Succeeded by Hamish Cowell

== Honours ==
Officer of the Most Excellent Order of the British Empire - 2012
