= Moore Crosthwaite =

British diplomat (1907–1989)

Sir Ponsonby Moore Crosthwaite KCMG (13 August 1907 – 27 April 1989) was a British diplomat, and ambassador to Lebanon and Sweden.

== Career ==
Ponsonby Moore Crosthwaite was educated at Rugby School and Corpus Christi College, Oxford. He held a Laming Fellowship at The Queen's College, Oxford, in 1931 and joined the Diplomatic Service in 1932. He served at Baghdad, Moscow, Madrid and Athens before being appointed Deputy UK Representative to the United Nations in New York 1952–58, Ambassador to Lebanon 1958–63 and Ambassador to Sweden 1963–66.

== Honours ==
Moore Crosthwaite was appointed a Companion of the Order of St Michael and St George (CMG) in the 1951 New Year Honours and promoted to Knight Commander of the Order (KCMG)) in the 1960 New Year Honours.

Diplomatic posts
Preceded by Sir George Middleton	Ambassador Extraordinary and Plenipotentiary at Beirut; 1958–1963	Succeeded by Sir Derek Riches
Preceded by Sir John Coulson	Ambassador Extraordinary and Plenipotentiary at Stockholm; 1963–1966	Succeeded by Sir Guy Millard
