= William Quantrill (diplomat) =

British diplomat (1939–2025)

Quantrill in 2005

William Ernest Quantrill (4 May 1939 – 20 June 2025) was a British diplomat who served as Ambassador to Cameroon from 1991 to 1995.

== Early life ==
Quantrill was educated at Colston's School and Durham University, graduating with a first-class BA in French. He was Secretary of Hatfield College JCR in 1959, and also represented the college at rugby.

He joined the Foreign and Commonwealth Office in 1962. He was appointed to HM Diplomatic Service in December 1965.

== Career ==
From 1964 to 1980 he served in several overseas posts in Belgium, Cuba, the Philippines, and Nigeria. From 1980 to 1981 he was Head of Training Department and from 1984 to 1988 was Counsellor and Head of Chancery at the British Embassy in Venezuela. He subsequently served as Deputy Governor of Gibraltar until 1990. Quantrill's tenure in Gibraltar coincided with a breakdown in relations between the Gibraltar and Spanish governments after a Gibraltarian court ordered the apprehension of four Spanish customs officials accused of illegal entry and illegal possession of arms. He held a crisis meeting in London with Nicholas Gordon-Lennox, the British Ambassador to Spain, on 29 July 1989.

Quantrill became Ambassador to Cameroon in 1991, also serving as non-resident representative to the Central African Republic, Equatorial Guinea, and Chad.

== Death ==
Quantrill died in Bath, Somerset on 20 June 2025, at the age of 86.

Diplomatic posts
Preceded by Martin Reith	British Ambassador to Cameroon; 1991–1995	Succeeded by Nicholas McCarthy
