= List of high commissioners of the United Kingdom to Cameroon =

The high commissioner of the United Kingdom to the Republic of Cameroon is the head of the United Kingdom's diplomatic mission in Cameroon.

In 1960, the French colony of Cameroon became independent as the Republic of Cameroun. The southern part of British Cameroons merged with it in 1961 to form the Federal Republic of Cameroon. The country was renamed the United Republic of Cameroon in 1972 and the Republic of Cameroon in 1984. Cameroon joined the British Commonwealth in 1995: before then the British head of mission was an ambassador, but now that Cameroon is in the Commonwealth the head of mission is a high commissioner.

British ambassadors and high commissioners to Cameroon have also been non-resident ambassadors to the Central African Republic from 1966 until 1970 and from 1982; to the Republic of Chad from 1966 until 1970 and from 1990; to the Republic of Equatorial Guinea from 1969; and to the Gabonese Republic from 1966 until 1978 and from 1995. In 2018 the UK government opened a new office in N'Djamena, the capital of Chad, "to support diplomatic, development and defence efforts" but the ambassador is still non-resident (in Cameroon) and the new office does not provide consular assistance.

== List of heads of mission ==
=== Ambassadors ===
- 1960–1961: Patrick Johnston
- 1961–1963: Cecil King
- 1963–1966: Sir Edward Warner
- 1966–1969: Alan Edden
- 1970–1972: Anthony Golds
- 1972–1975: Edward Given
- 1975–1979: Albert Saunders
- 1981–1984: Bryan Sparrow
- 1984–1987: James Glaze
- 1987–1991: Martin Reith
- 1991–1995: William Quantrill

=== High commissioners ===
- 1995–1998: Nicholas McCarthy
- 1998–2002: Peter Boon
- 2002–2006: Richard Wildash
- 2006–2009: Syd Maddicott
- 2009–2013: Bharat Joshi
- 2013–2017: Brian Olley
- 2017–2021: Rowan Laxton
- 2021–2023: Christian Dennys-McClure
- 2023–2024: Barry Lowen
- 2024–present: Matt Woods
