= John Beaven (diplomat) =

British diplomat (1930–2004)

John Lewis Beaven CMG CVO (30 July 1930 in Newport, Gwent – 11 April 2004) was a British diplomat.

Beaven underwent his national service in the RAF from 1948 to 1950. He joined the Foreign Office in 1956, serving as an Assistant Trade Commissioner in Karachi until 1960. After a succession of postings in Asia and Africa over the following decades, Beaven was Consul-General in San Francisco (1982-1986) and finally Ambassador to Sudan (1986-1990).

Diplomatic posts
Preceded by Alexander Stirling	British Ambassador to Sudan; 1986–1990	Succeeded by Allan Ramsay

== Honours ==
- Companion of the Order of St Michael and St George (CMG)
- Commander of the Royal Victorian Order (CVO)
