= Richard Ashton Beaumont =

British diplomat and Arabist

Sir Richard Ashton Beaumont KCMG OBE (29 December 1912 – 23 January 2009) was a British diplomat and Arabist who spent most his diplomatic career serving in the Arab world.

Educated at Repton School and Oriel College, Oxford, Beaumont joined the Consular Service in 1936, and was sent to Lebanon and Syria. In 1941 he joined the Army and served in Palestine. In 1944 he returned to the Foreign Office. He served as a counsellor in the British Embassy in Baghdad, and was later sent to Venezuela, his only foreign post outside the Arab world.

In 1958 Beaumont attended the Imperial Defence College. He then returned to the Foreign Office as head of the Arabian department. He was appointed as ambassador to Morocco in 1961, and ambassador to Iraq in 1965. When the Six-Day War broke out in 1967, the Iraqi government broke off diplomatic relations with the United Kingdom, and Beaumont had 48 hours to leave the country. He returned to London, where he was appointed deputy under-secretary of state. He served as ambassador to Egypt from 1969 to 1973, and did much to strengthen Anglo-Egyptian relations. Following his retirement, he headed several organisations dealing with British-Arab relations, such as the Arab British Chamber of Commerce (ABCC) where he served as the Chairman from 1980 to 1996. He was a governor of the School of Oriental and African Studies.

Diplomatic posts
Preceded by Sir Charles Duke	British Ambassador to Morocco; 1961–1965	Succeeded by Gilbert Holliday
Preceded by Sir Roger Allen	British Ambassador to Iraq; 1965–1967	Suspended Six-Day War Title next held by Trefor Ellis Evans
Preceded by Sir Harold Beeley as Ambassador to the United Arab Republic	British Ambassador to Egypt; 1969–1973	Succeeded by Sir Philip Adams
