= George Middleton (diplomat) =

British diplomat (1910–1998)

Sir George Humphrey Middleton KCMG
- Portrait by Walter Bird, 1958
- Born: 21 January 1910
- Died: 12 February 1998 (aged 88)
- Occupation: Diplomat
- Spouses: Elizabeth Rosalie Okeden; Francoise Sarthou

Sir George Humphrey Middleton KCMG (21 January 1910 – 12 February 1998) was a British diplomat.

He served as the United Kingdom's ambassador to Lebanon (1956–1958), Argentina (1961–1964) and Egypt (1964–1965). He was also Chief Political Resident in the Persian Gulf Residency and Chargé d'affaires in Iran during the Abadan Crisis.

== Personal life ==
He married first in 1934, Elizabeth Rosalie Okeden (Tina) Pockley, the Australian detective novelist Elizabeth Antill. They divorced and he then married Francoise Sarthou, (1927–2019), an interior decorator and patron of the international charity Children and Families Across Borders. She was formerly married to the French diplomat Philip Dahan-Bouchard.

Diplomatic posts
Preceded by Sir Edwin Chapman-Andrews	British Ambassador to Lebanon; 1956–1958	Succeeded by Sir Moore Crosthwaite
Preceded by Sir Bernard Burrows	Chief Political Resident in the Persian Gulf Residency; 1958–1961	Succeeded by Sir William Luce
Preceded by Sir John Ward	British Ambassador to Argentina; 1961–1964	Succeeded by Sir Michael Creswell
Preceded by Sir Harold Beeley	British Ambassador to the United Arab Republic; 1964–1965	Suspended Rhodesia Crisis Title next held by Sir Harold Beeley
