= Allan Ramsay (diplomat) =

British diplomat (1937–2022)

Allan Ramsay KBE CMG

British Ambassador to Morocco
- In office 1992–1996
- Preceded by: John Macrae
- Succeeded by: William Fullerton

British Ambassador to the Sudan
- In office 1990–1991
- Preceded by: John Beaven
- Succeeded by: Peter Streams

British Ambassador to the Lebanon
- In office 1988–1990
- Preceded by: John Gray
- Succeeded by: David Tatham

Personal details
- Born: Allan John Heppel Ramsay; 19 October 1937
- Died: 5 January 2022 (aged 84)

Sir Allan John Heppel Ramsay KBE CMG (19 October 1937 – 5 January 2022) was a British diplomat.

== Early life and education ==
The son of Norman Ramsay Ramsay and wife Evelyn Faith Sorel-Cameron, Ramsay was educated at Salisbury Cathedral School, Bedford School and the Royal Military Academy Sandhurst.

== Career ==
Ramsay was in the British Army from 1957 to 1970, serving in the Somerset Light Infantry until 1964, followed by two years in the Trucial Oman Scouts, and finally joining the Durham Light Infantry for the remainder of his service. He completed an Arabic language course at Durham University and subsequently attended MECAS from 1968 to 1969. He joined the Foreign and Commonwealth Office in 1970.

He was British Ambassador to the Lebanon (1988–1990), British Ambassador to the Sudan (1990–1991) and British Ambassador to Morocco (1992–1996).

Ramsay died at home in France on the 5 January 2022, at the age of 84.

== Honours ==
- Knight Commander of the Most Excellent Order of the British Empire (KBE) – 1992
- Companion of the Most Distinguished Order of St Michael and St George (CMG) – 1989

== Publications ==
- "The green baize door: social identity in Wodehouse, Part One" in The Contemporary Review 285, Issue 1667 (2004), 352-357 (full text online)
- "The green baize door: social identity in Wodehouse, Part Two" in The Contemporary Review 286, Issue 1668 (January 2005), 39-46 (full text online)

Diplomatic posts
Preceded by Sir John Gray	Ambassador to the Lebanon; 1988–1990	Succeeded by David Tatham
Preceded by John Beaven	Ambassador to the Sudan; 1990–1991	Succeeded by Peter Streams
Preceded by John Macrae	Ambassador to Morocco; 1992–1996	Succeeded by William Fullerton
