= Arab British Chamber of Commerce =

International trade organization in London

Arab British Chamber of Commerce (غرفة التجارة العربية البريطانية) established 6 February 1975, is an international trade organisation based in London. Although a not-for-profit body, its role is to encourage, promote and facilitate trade, investment and joint ventures since 1975 between participating representatives of Arab states and of the United Kingdom (UK).

Its regular events include business networking, conferences, seminars, and workshops for those involved or intending to be involved in business deals between the two regions. These and its related publication and organising roles involve representatives of Arab businesses, chambers of commerce and high-level bodies, particularly those of the Arab League, those of the Arab diplomatic missions in London, UK Trade & Investment (UKTI), British Chambers of Commerce and the Foreign & Commonwealth Office. Its motto: ‘Friendship through Trade’ has earned it a well-established name in the Arab and British business sectors over the decades.

== History ==
Arab Joint Chambers of Commerce were an initiative of the Economic Council of the League of Arab States in the early 1970s. This led to the decision by the member states to set up the Arab British Chamber of Commerce – by Decree No. K1175/D52/G – who mandated it to: ‘promote, encourage and facilitate bilateral trade’. On 10 January 1975, the Department of Trade granted the Chamber a licence. The Chamber was officially founded by incorporation and registration on 6 February 1975, as a non-political and non-profit making company and the first board of directors was elected.

The first priority, after appointment of its first Secretary-General and Chief Executive, Abdul Karim Al Mudaris, was to create a nucleus of staff capable of establishing a firm presence in the business world, setting out to attract membership by providing basic services to members and creating a physical capacity to handle the certification and documentation which is an essential part of the export procedure for the shipment of goods from the United Kingdom to Arab states. In this stage, it was vital for the Chamber to establish sound working relations with British Chambers of Commerce and set up a system capable of handling the vast flow of export documentation.

In October 1976, the Chamber started issuing Certificates of Origin for goods exported from Britain to Arab countries, after securing a licence from the Department of Trade and Industry in the UK to issue these certificates. The form of these was designed in consultation with the DTI and in conformity with international standardised rules. The Chamber's Certificate of Origin was recognised by all Arab countries as a document which has to be completed and certified by the Chamber and legalised by Arab consular authorities accredited in the UK.

From the day the first board of directors was elected, the Chamber had aspirations to become a body of influence, providing a unique bridge between Britain and the Arab world participating in wide range of activities associated with economic exchange and the positive promotion of cultural understanding. The result has been a rapid but controlled expansion, matched by slight adjustments to policy-making, becoming a notable organisation engaged in a broad range of activities and playing a full part in the business life of both regions.

By 1981, the Chamber published its first Annual Directory, printed in Arabic and English, an updated, headline economic survey of each Arab state and of the United Kingdom. This provides a full membership list followed by commercial information.

In 1980 the Chairmanship passed to Sir Richard Beaumont and the Board was composed of 40 leading Arab and British businessmen, officials, bankers and industrialists. A sound departmental structure was in place, reflecting the various functions of the Chamber, administered by highly qualified Arab and British staff. The Chamber was starting to establish itself in the mind of the European Community with its considerable importance in the area of Arab-British trade policy.

The Chamber moved to new premises in 1984, where all the departments were brought under one roof at 6 Belgrave Square. The building was initially inaugurated on 18 September 1985 by Britain's then Secretary of State of the Foreign and Commonwealth Office (the Foreign Secretary) Geoffrey Howe and Arab Ambassadors in London. This attendance was a recognition of the importance of such trade and the role of the Chamber.

Also in the 1980s, as part of its development programme, the Chamber sought to act as a conduit for information on science and technology forming an extensive base of knowledge and practice in Britain and the Arab governmental and private sectors. To this end, the Chamber launched the publication of a specialised magazine, the "Science & Technology Now". This development allowed wider contacts to be made in the university sector in the UK as a whole, and with British industry which itself was seen as a source of technological development.

In addition, Saturday classes were run by the Chamber to teach and enhance Arabic among British-Arab children. Similarly, the Chamber founded a Charitable Foundation financed by the percentage of the Chamber's surplus, the main objective of which was to provide scholarship for Arab students on post-graduate degrees in science and technology at British universities. These educational aspects of its work were warmly welcomed by governments, businesses, and academia.

With the growing importance of the European Union as a single market and single organisation in terms of trade negotiations in the 1990s, the Chamber sought to bring this European dimension into its activities by inviting representatives to present the policies and procedures of the European Union to the Arab audience. During this time, Britain and other European countries gained large net inward investment from Arab countries which created opportunities for European-based technology and skills.

For more than 40 years the Chamber has served the business community by developing a wide range of services that continue to grow and adapt to the rapidly changing global business environment. In 2004, the Chamber moved its headquarters to 43 Upper Grosvenor Street (between the Grosvenor House Hotel fronting Park Lane) and Grosvenor Square in the prestigious Mayfair area of London.

== Chairman ==
- James Prior (1996–2004)

== Secretary General ==
Bandar Ali Reda joined and was appointed to the Chamber on 1 March 2019, as Secretary General and CEO, the fourth such holder. He had served as a senior diplomat and as an executive in the global banking domain, including at SABB HSBC Saudi Arabia. He was a Commercial Attaché in the UK & Europe, based in London, and before that in Italy and the Saudi delegation to BIE in Paris. Reda graduated in Economics and Business Administration in Orlando. He has served as an Executive Member of a Saudi-Italian Business Council; on the Business Youth Committee, Jeddah; and on the Saudi Economy Association. Reda leads an effort to strengthen Arab-British bilateral trade, investment and improved relations more generally.

== ABCC partners ==
The Arab British Chamber of Commerce works in close co-operation with:

- League of Arab States
- Foreign & Commonwealth Office
- The Council of Arab Ambassadors
- United Kingdom Trade & Investment (UKTI)
- The Arab State Ministries
- The General Union of Arab Chambers
- Federation of Joint Arab Chambers Commerce by State
- Federation of British Chambers of Commerce by City
