= James Hayes Sadler (colonial administrator) =

British colonial administrator and governor of Kenya

Sir James Hayes Sadler KCMG CB FRGS
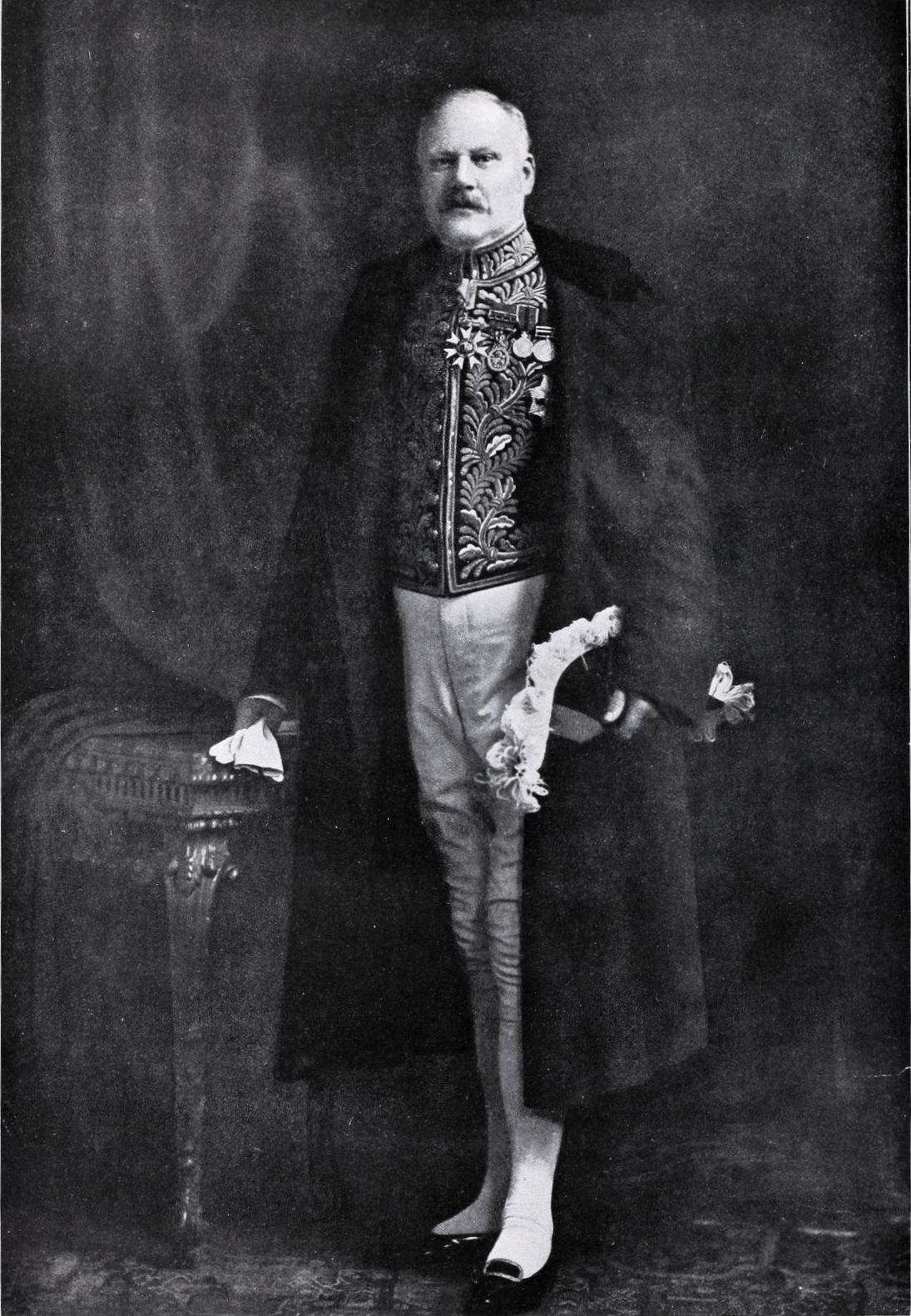

Governor of the British East Africa Protectorate
- In office 1905–1909
- Preceded by: Sir Donald Stewart
- Succeeded by: Sir Percy Girouard

Governor of the Windward Islands
- In office 1909–1914
- Preceded by: Sir Ralph Champneys Williams
- Succeeded by: Sir George Haddon-Smith

Personal details
- Born: 11 October 1851 London, England
- Died: 21 April 1922 (aged 70)
- Parent: James Hayes Sadler (father)
- Awards: Knight Commander of the Order of St Michael and St George

Military service
- Rank: Lieutenant Colonel

Lieutenant colonel Sir James Hayes Sadler KCMG CB FRGS (11 October 1851 – 21 April 1922) was a British colonial administrator and governor of Kenya and the Windward Islands.

== Early life and education ==
Sadler was born to Colonel Sir James Hayes Sadler and Sophia-Jane Sadler (née Taylor) on 11 October 1851 in London, England. In 1875, he married Rita Annie Smith (1856–1918), and had three sons.

== Career ==
He rose to the rank of Lieutenant-Colonel in the British Indian Army, with which he saw active service.

In 1893 and again from 1893–94, he was Chief political resident of the Persian Gulf (for Bahrain, Kuwait, Oman, Qatar, and the Trucial States). In 1898 he was appointed Consul-General of the British Protectorate on the Somali Coast. In 1902 he left what is now Somaliland to become Commissioner in Uganda, a position he held until 1907.

On 12 December 1905, Sadler was appointed the first governor of the British East African Protectorate, succeeding commissioner Donald William Stewart who died in office on 1 October 1905. In 1909 he was transferred to be Governor and Commander-in-Chief of the Windward Islands and their Dependencies, a post he filled until 1914.

== Honours and awards ==
After nomination by his father, he became a Fellow of the Royal Geographical Society in December 1901, eventually resigning in 1921. He was appointed Companion, Order of the Bath (CB) in the 1902 Coronation Honours, and appointed Knight Commander, Order of St. Michael and St. George (KCMG) in 1907.

Diplomatic posts
Preceded by Stuart Godfrey	Chief political resident of the Persian Gulf; 1893	Succeeded by James Crawford
Preceded by James Crawford	Chief political resident of the Persian Gulf; 1893–1894	Succeeded by Frederick Wilson
Preceded by William Ferris (Resident)	Consul-General of British Somaliland (Resident 1897-8); 1898–1901	Succeeded by Eric Swayne
Government offices
Preceded by Sir Harry Johnston	Commissioner of Uganda; 1902–1906	Succeeded by Hesketh Bell
Preceded by Sir Donald Stewart	Governor of the British East Africa Protectorate; 1905–1909	Succeeded by Sir Percy Girouard
Preceded by Sir Ralph Champneys Williams	Governor of the Windward Islands; 1909–1914	Succeeded by Sir George Haddon-Smith
