= Nicholas Bayne =

British diplomat

Sir Nicholas Peter Bayne, KCMG (born 15 February 1937) is a retired British diplomat.

== Biography ==
The son of Captain Ronald Bayne, RN and Elisabeth Ashcroft, Bayne was educated at Eton College and Christ Church, Oxford, where he graduated MA and DPhil.

He joined HM Diplomatic Service in 1961, and was posted at the British Embassy in Manilla (1963–66) and Bonn (1969–72). Seconded to HM Treasury in 1974–75, he then became Financial Counsellor at the British Embassy in Paris in 1975–79. He was head of the Financial Relations Department (later Economic Relations Department) at the Foreign and Commonwealth Office in 1979–82, and was attached to the Royal Institute of International Affairs in 1982–83.

Bayne was appointed British Ambassador to Zaire in 1983, with concurrent accreditation to the Congo, Rwanda and Burundi from 1984. He was seconded to the Civil Service Selection Board in 1985. He was British Ambassador and Permanent Representative to the OECD in Paris from 1985 to 1988, Deputy Under-Secretary of State at the Foreign and Commonwealth Office from 1988 to 1992. His final appointed was that of British High Commissioner to Canada in Ottawa, where served from 1992 to 1996.

In retirement, Bayne was chairman of the Liberalisation of Trade in Services Committee of the British Invisibles from 1996 to 2000. He has been a fellow of the International Department of the London School of Economics since 1997.

Appointed a CMG in 1984, Bayne was promoted to KCMG in 1992.

== Family ==
Bayne married Diana Wilde in 1961; they have three sons, one of whom predeceased them.

== Publications ==
- (with R. D. Putnam) Hanging Together: the Seven-Power Summits, 1984, revised edition 1987;
- Hanging in There: the G7 and G8 summit in maturity and renewal, 2000;
- The Grey Wares of North-West Anatolia and their Relation to the Early Greek Settlements, 2000;
- (with S. Woolcock) The New Economic Diplomacy, 2003, 4th edition 2017;
- Staying Together: the G8 summit confronts the 21st century, 2005;
- Economic Diplomat (memoirs), 2010
