= Alexander Stirling =

British diplomat (1927–2014)

Sir Alexander John Dickson Stirling KBE CMG (20 October 1927 – 16 July 2014) was a British diplomat who was the UK's first ambassador to Bahrain, later ambassador to Iraq, Tunisia and Sudan.

== Career ==
Stirling was educated at Edinburgh Academy, served with the Royal Air Force in Egypt 1945–48, then read Modern Languages at Lincoln College, Oxford. In 1951 he joined the Foreign Office and was sent to learn Arabic at the Middle East Centre for Arab Studies, after which he served at Beirut, Cairo, Baghdad and as consul at Amman. He was posted to the British Embassy at Santiago 1965–67 and led the UK Delegation to the fourth Antarctic Treaty Consultative Meeting in 1966.

After serving at the Foreign Office 1967–69 Stirling was posted as Political Agent to Bahrain, which had been under British protection since 1860. Bahrain declared independence in 1971 and Stirling became the first British ambassador to Bahrain. He was posted to Beirut again as Counsellor 1972–75, then attended the Royal College of Defence Studies before being appointed Ambassador to Iraq 1977–80,

On 19 June 1980 he survived an assassination attempt: three terrorists burst into the embassy at Baghdad and fired three shots at him, one of which passed across his chest and through the lapel of his jacket. After Iraq, Stirling was ambassador to Tunisia 1981–84 and to Sudan 1984–86.

Stirling then retired from the Diplomatic Service and for 20 years worked with the charity SOS Sahel, as a member of its Council and as Chairman 1993–97.

== Honours ==
Stirling was appointed CMG in the 1976 New Year Honours and knighted KBE in the 1981 Birthday Honours.

Coat of arms of Alexander Stirling

Motto
Gang Forward

== Sources ==
- Sir Alexander Stirling - obituary, The Telegraph, London, 1 September 2014
- Sir Alexander Stirling (obituary), The Times, London, 9 September 2014

Diplomatic posts
| New title | Ambassador to Bahrain; 1971–1972 | Succeeded by Robert Tesh |
| Preceded by John Graham | Ambassador to Iraq; 1977–1980 | Succeeded by Stephen Egerton |
| Preceded by John Lambert | Ambassador to Tunisia; 1981–1984 | Succeeded by Sir James Adams |
| Preceded by Richard Fyjis-Walker | Ambassador to Sudan; 1984–1986 | Succeeded by John Beaven |
