= Robert William Doughty Fowler =

British diplomat (1914–1985)

Sir Robert William Doughty Fowler KCMG (6 March 1914 – 29 May 1985) was a British civil servant in Burma and then a diplomat who served in a number of very troubled contexts during the transition from British imperial times to early post-colonial independence.
He was High Commissioner to the United Republic of Tanzania in 1964-65 and Ambassador to Sudan from 1966 to 1967 and again from 1968 to 1970.
Perhaps his most intellectually taxing assignment was serving at the UN in New York as political adviser to Sir Gladwyn Jebb, especially as an expert on the Kashmir dispute.

== Biography ==
Fowler was born on 6 March 1914 and was educated at what was then called QEGS (Queen Elizabeth's Grammar School) (now Queen Elizabeth's Academy) in Mansfield, and Emmanuel College, Cambridge, where he studied modern languages. After a long car journey with friends from the UK to India, he was taken on by the Indian Civil Service, and was in the Burma Civil Service from 1937 to 1948 (including working with the Burma Army (Military Administration), 1944–46), then joined the Commonwealth Relations Office in 1948. Fowler was involved in UK-US discussions at the UN in New York about Kashmir in December 1950, two years after the UN-brokered ceasefire. He went on to serve in Rhodesia and Nyasaland (at the time of the federation), Pakistan, Canada and Nigeria. His time as High Commissioner in Tanzania ended abruptly when diplomatic relations were broken in 1965. The same happened in 1967 when he was ambassador in Sudan, but he returned to his post the following year. During the break in his tenure in Khartoum, he served as administrator of the Gibraltar referendum.

He was knighted in the 1966 New Year Honours for his diplomatic service, as a Knight Commander of the Order of St Michael and St George (KCMG), having previously been appointed a Commander of that Order (CMG) in the 1962 Birthday Honours.

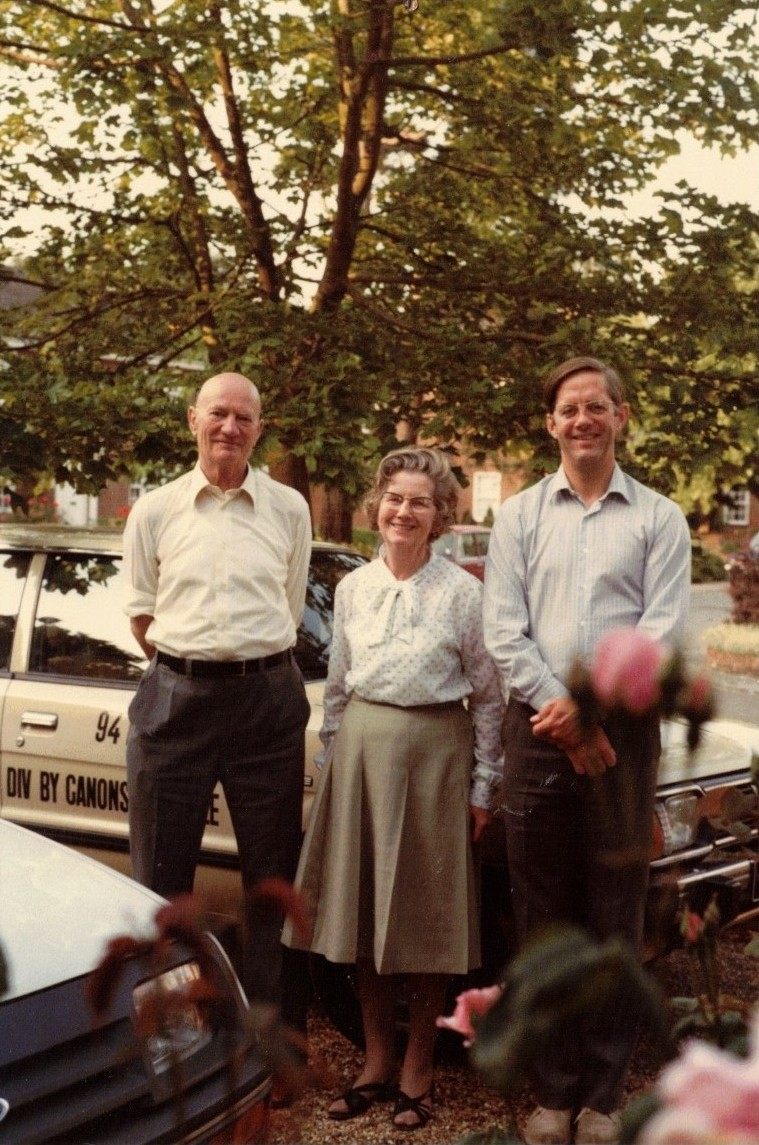
Bob Fowler with wife Margaret & son Ian, prob in Germany c1982

His full record of FCO posts is listed as follows:

- Head of South Asia Department, Commonwealth Relations Office, 1953-1954;
- Head of Central Africa and Territories Department, Foreign and Commonwealth Office, 1954-1956;
- Deputy High Commissioner, Pakistan, 1956-1959;
- Deputy High Commissioner, Canada, 1959-1962;
- Deputy High Commissioner, Nigeria, 1962-1964;
- High Commissioner to Tanzania, 1964-1965;
- Assistant Under-Secretary for Commonwealth Affairs, 1966;
- Ambassador to Sudan, 1966-1967;
- Assistant Under-Secretary for Commonwealth Affairs, 1967-1968;
- Ambassador to Sudan, 1968-1970

=== Burma Civil Service ===
During his diplomatic service in Burma, Sir Robert Fowler was present during the assassination of Aung San and seven cabinet ministers on 19 July 1947. He provided a firsthand account of the event, describing the political climate and the impact on the country's governance.

=== Tanzania ===
Fowler's post as the most senior British envoy in Tanzania was especially difficult because of post-colonial tensions.

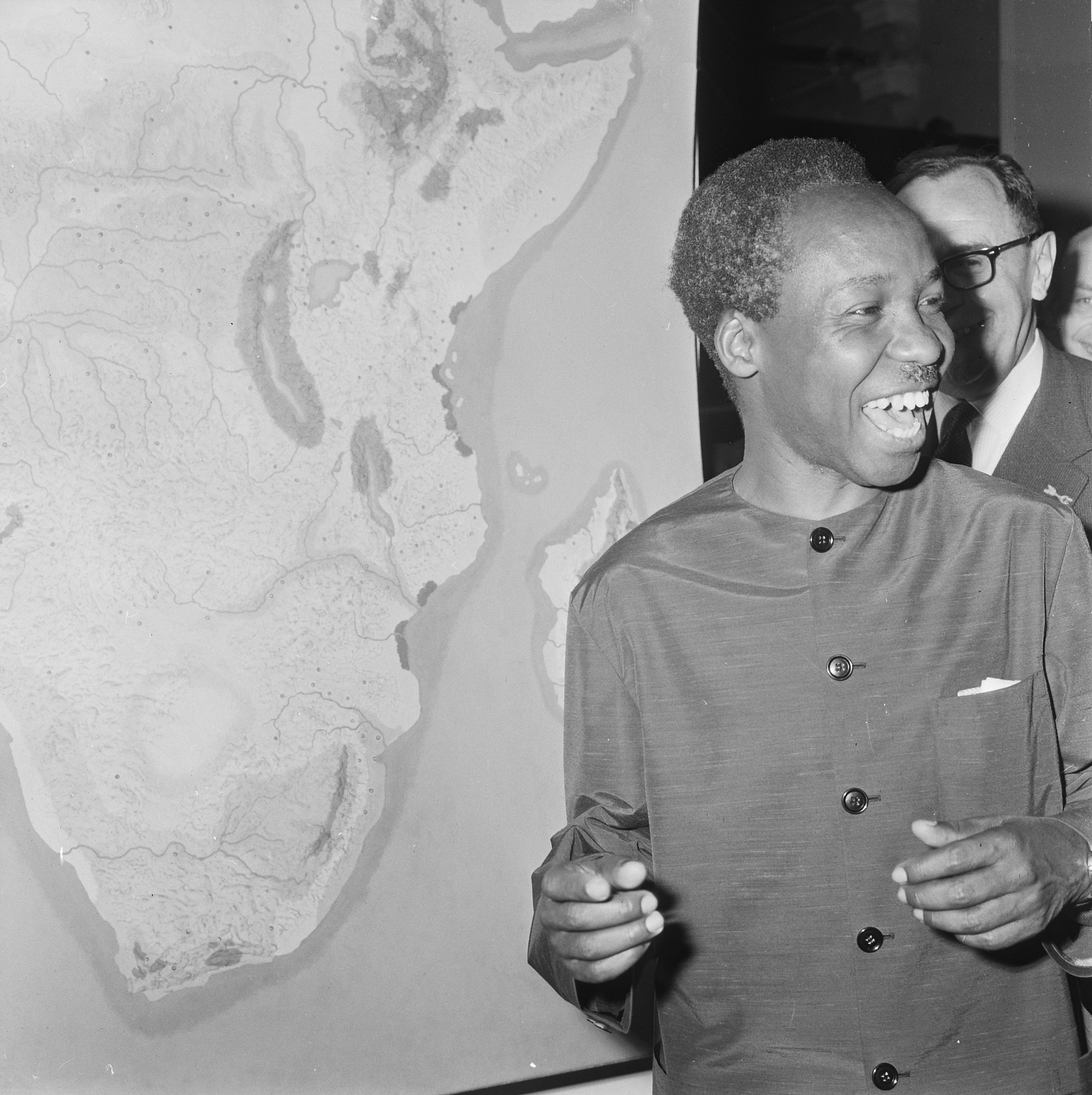
President Julius Nyerere in 1965, the year in which he severed diplomatic relations with Britain

In 1965, Tanzania cut diplomatic ties with the UK in protest over Britain’s handling of the crisis over Rhodesia (now Zimbabwe). That year, Rhodesia’s white minority government, led by Ian Smith, issued a Unilateral Declaration of Independence (UDI) to block black majority rule. Britain condemned the move but refused to use force to overturn it. Tanzania’s President Julius Nyerere saw this as a betrayal of African liberation and an implicit acceptance of white minority rule. Outraged by Britain’s inaction, Nyerere in December 1965 expelled Fowler, the British High Commissioner, and severed diplomatic relations, reflecting deep African frustration with Britain’s failure to decisively confront what they saw as colonial injustice. <be> In December 1965, during this diplomatic crisis, Fowler appeared rather in the eye of the storm in a newsreel broadcast by Pathé News entitled: "Diplomacy Suspended".

=== Sudan ===
Fowler took up his post as Ambassador in Khartoum the year preceding the Six-Day War (from 5 to 10 June 1967). This was a very volatile period during which to represent Britain in an Arab country with a large and vocal Muslim population. The Arab League expressed its public stance towards Israel in the Khartoum Resolution, issued on September 1, 1967, at the conclusion of a summit held in Sudan's capital. The resolution is famous for its "Three Noes": no peace with Israel, no recognition of Israel, and no negotiations with Israel. Since Britain were seen to support Israel's war, diplomatic relations were severed and Fowler and his wife had to leave Khartoum. They did, however, return in 1968.

=== Evaluation ===
In the 2010s and 20s there has been vigorous debate about the probity or otherwise of British colonial officials. Nigel Biggar's Colonialism: A Moral Reckoning has been both lauded and loathed. The ethical issues flagged up by Biggar would be good yardsticks with which to evaluate Fowler's work. There is no sign of a written evaluation of Bob Fowler's work as a diplomat; he was not a senior enough figure to warrant a full biography, neither was he in one country long enough to garner major attention from historians of any one nation. However, he is mentioned on occasion by those looking back at Britain's involvement in the post-(British) colonial world.

One example is his attitude to the highest echelons of justice in Nigeria. (For background: the Judicial Committee of the Privy Council (JCPC) was once the final court of appeal for Nigeria, but this role has been largely replaced by the Supreme Court of Nigeria. The JCPC retains jurisdiction over certain appeals that were pending on October 1, 1963, but generally, Nigeria's final appeals are now handled by the Supreme Court). The 2013 Oxford University Press book by Nigerian-Canadian legal historian Bonny Ibhawoh entitled Imperial Justice: Africans in Empire's Court mentions Fowler in this regard:

"Prominent among the government officials critical of the JCPC was the Attorney General and Minister for Justice, Taslim Elias, who put forward political and legal arguments against the retention of JCPC appeals. Nevertheless, the British High Commissioner Robert Fowler, under instructions from the Colonial Office, unsuccessfully tried to convince the government to continue non-constitutional appeals to the Privy Council.
Although the tide of official and public opinion was against the retention of Privy Council appeals, some officials held out hope that a reformed JCPC could still play a role in the country's judicial system. Some of these officials preferred the strengthening rather than weakening of the legal and judicial ties with Britain. British officials were quick to identify such pro-JCPC officials as local allies in the push to keep JCPC jurisdiction in Nigeria. Perhaps the most prominent of these local allies was the Nigerian judge Sir Adetokumbo Ademola."
