= Robin Hooper =

WW2 RAF Pilot and British diplomat

Sir Robin Hooper
- Born: Robin William John Hooper; 26 July 1914; Atcham, Shropshire, England
- Died: 14 June 1989 (aged 74); Ashford, Kent, England
- Occupations: WWII RAF Pilot and career diplomat

Sir Robin William John Hooper KCMG DSO DFC (26 July 1914 – 14 June 1989) was an English Royal Air Force pilot and diplomat. He served in the Royal Air Force during World War II and later became the British Ambassador to Greece.

Hooper was educated at Queen's College, Oxford, where he became a member of the Oxford University Air Squadron.

On the night of 16/17 November 1943, Flight Lieutenant Hooper, took off in Westland Lysander 'MA-D' ("D" for "Dog") from RAF Tangmere, with Special Operations Executive (SOE) agents in the rear cockpit, for a field in France. The outward flight was uneventful, but upon landing in a field he soon realised that the ground was extremely soft, requiring a lot of throttle to keep the aircraft moving. In making the turn to return to meet the 'reception committee' of local maquis, the Lysander became stuck. The aircraft was immovable and even with maximum throttle the aircraft became bogged down in the mud. After attempts to manually push the Lysander out failed, it was decided to get some bullocks from the nearest farm. The farmer and his family, eager to help, brought two bullocks with them, while trenches were dug in front of the wheels to form a ramp. However, this attempt failed and two more bullocks were fetched, also to no avail.

After two hours fruitlessly trying to free the Lysander from the morass, Robin finally realised that there was no hope of digging the aircraft out and set about setting it on fire. The aircraft burnt well in the misty field and soon the agents and Robin were on their way back to a resistance safe house. Robin was safely hidden from the Germans until he was evacuated by fellow pick-up pilot Lewis (Bob) Hodges a month later on the night of 16/17 December. Hooper was evacuated along with agent Joseph Dubar, codenamed 'Jean'. Spending the return flight on the floor of the Lysander, Hooper later said of his journey:

I was absolutely terrified - that little Jean was going to be sick all over me.

He was knighted in the 1968 Birthday Honours. He was appointed British ambassador to Tunisia in 1966, and served as British ambassador to the Greek government from 1971 to 1974.

== Honours ==
In recognition of his service with 161 Squadron during WWII, Hooper was awarded the Distinguished Flying Cross in 1943 and the Distinguished Service Order in 1944. He also received the Croix de Guerre and Legion of Honour in 1946.

During his post-war career as a civil servant, Hooper was awarded the CMG in 1954 and the KCMG in 1968.

== Bibliography ==
- Verity, Hugh (1978). We Landed by Moonlight. Crecy Publishing Limited. ISBN 9-780947-554750.
- Clutton-Brock, Oliver (2009). RAF Evaders: The Complete Story of RAF Escapees and Their Escape Lines, Western Europe, 1940-1945. Bounty Books. ISBN 978-0-753722-79-4.
