= John Gray (diplomat) =

British diplomat

Sir John Walton David Gray KBE CMG (1 October 1936 – 1 September 2003) was a senior British diplomat.

In 1987, as the British ambassador to Beirut, Gray unsuccessfully attempted to dissuade Terry Waite from re-entering Beirut without proper protection, with the result that Waite was kidnapped and held for nearly five years.

== Early life ==
John Gray was born in Burry Port in Carmarthenshire and educated at Blundell's School. After National Service in Cyprus and Egypt he attended Christ's College, Cambridge and later did postgraduate research in Arab nationalism at the Middle East Centre in Oxford and the American University in Cairo. He joined the diplomatic service in 1962 and retained his link with the Middle East throughout his career.

== Diplomatic career ==
- 1964 – Bahrain
- 1967 – Foreign and Commonwealth Office, London
- 1970 – Geneva
- 1974 – Sofia
- 1977 (approx) Jedda
- 1982 - Foreign and Commonwealth Office, London (Head of Maritime, Aviation and Environment Department)
- 1985 – Beirut (Ambassador)
- 1988 – Paris (Ambassador and UK Permanent Representative to the Organisation for Economic Co-operation and Development)
- 1992–1996 Belgium (Ambassador)

== Later career ==
Gray retired from the Foreign Office in 1996 and on returning to Wales became involved in public and community affairs, including:

- Vice-president WEA Llanelli (1998-2003)
- A member of the Cardiff Bay Development Corporation
- A trustee of the National Botanic Garden of Wales.
- Appointment as Honorary Consul of Belgium in Cardiff.
- Vice-president of Crawshays Welsh Rugby Football Club
- Participation in the work of the Institute of Welsh Affairs
- Chairman, Welsh Centre for International Affairs at Cardiff's Temple of Peace.
- Governor, University of Glamorgan
- Toastmasters International, After Dinner Speaker of the Year - 1993

== Sources ==
- "Obituary - Sir John Gray, The Times, 2 October 2003"
- "Obituary - Sir John Gray, The Independent, 8 September 2003"
