= Roderick Parkes =

British diplomat and colonial administrator

Portrait by Walter Bird, 1960

Sir Roderick Wallis Parkes KCMG OBE (2 April 1909 – 2 November 1972) was a British diplomat and colonial administrator.

After entering the Indian Civil Service in 1932, he served in the Punjab until 1935. From 1935 to 1947 he was in the Indian Political Service, serving as Secretary and later Counsellor at the British Legation, Kabul (1936–39) and on attachment as Liaison Commissioner (States) at the Food Department of the Government of India (1946–47), in charge of food arrangements for the then Indian States (population 100 million). He entered the Foreign Service in 1948, serving as Counsellor (Information) at Cairo (1949–52), Head of Information Division at Beirut (1952–53), Head of Information Services Department, Foreign Office (1953–54), and Counsellor and Chargé d'Affaires at Djakarta (1954–55) during which tour he reported on the first Afro-Asian Conference in Bandung.

He served as Ambassador to Saudi Arabia (1955–56) until diplomatic relations were severed as a result of the Suez Crisis, to Vietnam (1957–1960) where he exercised influence with President Diem at the start of the Communist insurgency, and to Sudan (1960–61) - an appointment cut short by illness. In 1962 he was seconded to the Civil Service Commission as Group Chairman, Civil Service Selection Board, and he served as Ambassador to Jordan from 1962 to 1966. Following his retirement in 1966, he lived in Castletown, Isle of Man, close to his friend and former senior colleague, Sir Ralph Stevenson.

The only child of Llywelyn Childs Parkes, registrar to a joint stock company (and nephew of the inventor Alexander Parkes), and his wife Sara May née Green, Parkes was educated at St Paul's School and Magdalen College, Oxford. He married in 1939 Eileen Mary Ernestine (4 May 1915 – 21 July 1977) daughter of Neville Edward Anning Gardner, and half-sister of the mathematician R. E. A. C. Paley. They had two sons. His grandson, also called Roderick Parkes, is a director at the German Institute for International and Security Affairs.
