= List of diplomats of the United Kingdom to other German States =

This List of Diplomats from the United Kingdom to other German States deals with diplomatic representation in Germany before German unification in the late 19th century. In that period, Germany consisted of many small sovereign states within the Holy Roman Empire (until 1805) then the German Empire.

== Separate lists ==
The following lists of diplomats exist as separate articles:

- For envoys to the Holy Roman Emperor see Austria.
- For envoys to the Imperial Diet at Ratisbon see Bavaria.
- For envoys to the Imperial Court at Brussels see Belgium.
- List of diplomats from the United Kingdom to Bavaria
- List of diplomats from the United Kingdom to the Elector of Cologne
- List of diplomats from the United Kingdom to the Hanseatic League
- List of diplomats from the United Kingdom to Hanover
- List of diplomats from the United Kingdom to Prussia (including to the Elector of Brandenberg)
- List of diplomats from the United Kingdom to Saxony
  - but 1698-1763 see Poland (when the Elector was king of Poland)
- List of diplomats from the United Kingdom to Württemberg

== Minor states with missions ==
=== Brunswick–Wolfenbüttel ===
- 1689–1714: As Hanover
- 1729 and 1730–1731: Richard Sutton
- 1745: Onslow Burrish
- 1761–1762: Colonel John Clavering
- 1765 and 1775–1776: Colonel William Faucitt
- 1794: Hon. William Eliot (special mission)
- 1794: James Harris, 1st Earl of Malmesbury (extraordinary mission)
- 1798: Thomas Grenville (special mission – may not have arrived)
- Then: No mission
- 1847–1856: John Duncan Bligh

=== Hesse–Cassel ===
- 1694–1695: Sir William Dutton Colt Envoy-extraordinary
- 1695–1697: George Stepney Minister then from 1695 Envoy-extraordinary
- 1700: Philip Plantamour
- 1706–1707: George Stepney Envoy-extraordinary and Plenipotentiary
- 1717–1720: James Haldane Minister
- 1727–1729: Richard Sutton Envoy-extraordinary
- 1742–1743: Thomas Villiers Minister Plenipotentiary
- 1745: Onslow Burrish
- 1757: Philip Stanhope
- 1760–1763: Colonel John Clavering Resident
- 1775–1777: Colonel William Faucitt military mission to raise troops
- 1784–1801: Ralph Heathcote senior Minister Plenipotentiary (also to Cologne)
  - 1786: John, Viscount Dalrymple
  - 1787: Lieut–Gen. William Faucitt
  - 1794: Francis Seymour-Conway, 17th Earl of Yarmouth
- 1801–1806: Brook Taylor
- 1806–1815: No diplomatic relations due to Napoleonic War
- 1815–1826: No diplomatic relations
- 1826–1866: The envoy to the German Confederation (resident at Frankfurt) was also accredited to Hesse–Cassel.

=== Liège ===
- 1742–1744: Onslow Burrish Secretary then in 1744 Resident (afterwards at Cologne)
- 1747–1755: George Cressner Resident (afterwards at Cologne)

=== Lorraine ===
- 1699: Richard Hill

=== Mecklenburg-Schwerin ===
- 1709: John Wich (see Hanseatic League)
- Then no representation until 1847
- 1847: Colonel George Lloyd Hodges (see Hanseatic League)
- From 1847: as Prussia

=== Palatinate ===
- 1695–1697 and 1701: George Stepney Envoy-extraordinary
- 1711: Charles Whitworth Envoy-extraordinary
- 1719–1720: James Haldane
- 1726: Isaac Heup
- No further missions until after 1777, when the Elector Palatine inherited Bavaria, after which see Bavaria

== Minor States without regular representation ==
These are states occasionally visited by diplomats, who were primarily accredited to larger states:

- Anhalt-Dessau: No mission until 1847, then as Prussia.
- Anhalt-Zerbst: Special mission in 1777–1778 by William Faucitt.
- Baden-Baden: 1747–1758 as Cologne.
- Baden (Grand Duke): from 1841 as Württemberg.
- Bishop of Bamberg: 1742-1758 as Cologne.
- Brandenburg-Anspach: 1742–1758 as Cologne; 1777 as Hesse-Cassel
- Brandenburg-Bayreuth: 1742-1758 as Cologne
- Hesse-Darmstadt: 1726 and 1743–1758 as Hesse Cassel
- Holstein-Gottorp: 1709 John Wich (see Hanseatic League)
- Elector of Mainz: 1695–1696 as Palatinate; 1726, 1745–1758, and 1763–1781 as Cologne
- Mecklenburg-Strelitz: 1761: Simon Harcourt, 1st Earl Harcourt Ambassador and Plenipotentiary to negotiate the royal marriage. From 1847 as Prussia
- Nassau: 1847–1848 and 1851–1866: as Prussia
- Saxe-Altenburg, Saxe-Coburg-Gotha, Saxe-Meiningen, and Saxe-Weimar-Eisenach: from 1847 as Saxony
- Count of Oldenburg: from 1847 as Hanover
- Elector of Trier: 1695–1769: same as Mainz
- Prince of Waldeck: 1776: special mission by William Faucitt
- Bishop of Würzburg: 1727 and 1742–1758: as Cologne
