= List of diplomats of the United Kingdom to Germany =

British Ambassador to the Federal Republic of Germany Britischer Botschafter in Deutschland
- Royal arms of His Majesty's Government

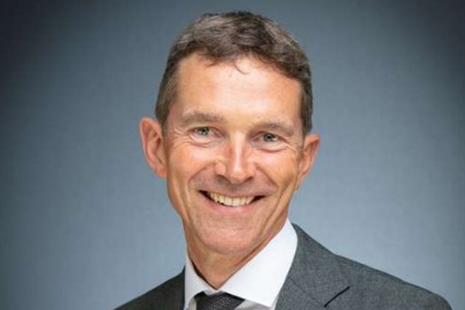
- Incumbent; Andrew Jonathan Mitchell; CMG since 4 September 2024
- Foreign, Commonwealth and Development Office; British Embassy, Berlin
- Style: His Excellency
- Reports to: Secretary of State for Foreign, Commonwealth and Development Affairs
- Seat: Berlin, Germany
- Appointer: The Crown on advice of the prime minister
- Term length: At His Majesty's pleasure
- Inaugural holder: Hon. Frederick Lamb
- Formation: 1824
- Website: British Embassy - Berlin

The British ambassador to Germany is the United Kingdom's foremost diplomatic representative in the Federal Republic of Germany, and in charge of the UK's diplomatic mission in Germany. The official title is His Britannic Majesty's Ambassador to the Federal Republic of Germany.

== History ==
On German unification in 1871 the British ambassador to the Kingdom of Prussia/North German Confederation in Berlin became the ambassador to the new German Empire. During the partition of Germany following World War II the Ambassador to the new Federal Republic (or West Germany) resided in Bonn, the capital, from 1952. Berlin once more became the capital at reunification in 1990 and the ambassador returned to Berlin in a new Embassy building, on the exact site of its predecessor in the Wilhelmstrasse, in 2000.

This article also includes the following predecessors:

- German Confederation, whose Diet was at Frankfurt.
- North German Confederation.

For envoys to the:

- Holy Roman Emperor see Austria.
- Imperial Diet at Ratisbon see Bavaria.
- Imperial Court at Brussels see Belgium.
- Elector of Cologne at Cologne and then Bonn see Cologne
- Electorate of Hanover and then Kingdom of Hanover at Hanover see Hanover
- Hanseatic cities of Bremen, Hamburg and Lübeck see Hanseatic Cities
- Landgraviate of Hesse-Kassel and then Electorate of Hesse at Darmstadt see Hesse-Cassel
- Elector of Brandenburg and to the Kingdom of Prussia at Berlin see Prussia
- Electorate of Saxony and then Kingdom of Saxony at Dresden see Saxony
- Kingdom of Württemberg at Stuttgart see Württemberg
- Other German States see other German states

== List of heads of mission ==
=== German Confederation ===
==== Envoys extraordinary and ministers plenipotentiary ====
- 1817–1824: Hon. Frederick Lamb
- 1824–1827: Hon. Frederick Cathcart
  - 1826–1828: John Ralph Milbanke Chargé d'Affaires (Legation secretary 1826–1835)
- 1828–1829: Henry Addington
- 1829–1830: George Chad
- 1830–1838: Thomas Cartwright
- 1838: Hon. Henry Fox
- 1838–1839: Ralph Abercromby
- 1840–1848: Hon. William Fox-Strangways
- 1848–1852: Henry Wellesley, 2nd Baron Cowley (Special Mission 1849-1851)
- 1852–1866: Sir Alexander Malet, 2nd Baronet

German Confederation dissolved 1866

=== North German Confederation ===
==== Ambassadors extraordinary and plenipotentiary ====
- 1868–1871: Lord Augustus Loftus (previously Ambassador to Prussia, 1866-1868)

North German Confederation becomes German Empire 1870-71

=== German Empire ===
==== Ambassadors extraordinary and plenipotentiary ====
- 1871–1884: Lord Odo Russell (created 1st Baron Ampthill in 1881)
- 1884–1895: Sir Edward Malet
- 1895–1908: Sir Frank Lascelles
- 1908–1914: Sir Edward Goschen

No representation 1914–1919 due to World War I—US diplomats mainly took care of duties during this time

=== Weimar Republic ===
==== Chiefs of the Military Mission to Berlin ====
- 1919: Gordon Macready
- 1919–1920: Neill Malcolm

==== Ambassadors extraordinary and plenipotentiary ====
- 1920: Lord Kilmarnock (later 21st Earl of Erroll) Chargé d'Affaires
- 1920–1926: Lord D'Abernon (created 1st Viscount D'Abernon in 1926)
- 1926–1928: The Hon Sir Ronald Lindsay
- 1928–1933: Sir Horace Rumbold

=== Third Reich ===
==== Ambassadors extraordinary and plenipotentiary ====
- 1933–1937: Sir Eric Phipps
- 1937–1939: Sir Nevile Meyrick Henderson

==== World War II and after ====
- No representation 1939–1945 due to World War II
- Post-war government of Germany 1945–1948 by Allied Control Council

=== West Germany ===
==== High commissioners at Allied High Commission ====
- 1949–1950: Sir Brian Robertson (later 1st Baron Robertson of Oakridge)
- 1950–1953: Sir Ivone Kirkpatrick
- 1953–1955: Sir Frederick Hoyer Millar (later 1st Baron Inchyra)

==== Ambassadors extraordinary and plenipotentiary ====
- 1955–1957: Sir Frederick Hoyer Millar (later 1st Baron Inchyra)
- 1957–1962: Sir Christopher Steel
- 1962–1968: Sir Frank Roberts
- 1968–1972: Sir Roger Jackling
- 1972–1975: Sir Nicholas Henderson
- 1975–1981: Sir Oliver Wright
- 1981–1984: Sir Jock Taylor
- 1984–1988: Sir Julian Bullard
- 1988–1990: Sir Christopher Mallaby

=== East Germany ===
==== Ambassadors extraordinary and plenipotentiary ====
- 1974–1976: Sir Curtis Keeble
- 1976–1978: Sir Percy Cradock
- 1978–1981: Peter Martin Foster
- 1981–1984: Peter Maxey
- 1984–1988: Timothy Everard
- 1988–1990: Sir Nigel Broomfield
- 1990: Patrick Eyers

=== Germany ===
==== Ambassadors extraordinary and plenipotentiary ====
- 1990–1993: Sir Christopher Mallaby
- 1993–1997: Sir Nigel Broomfield
- 1997: Christopher Meyer (later Sir Christopher Meyer)
- 1997–2003: Sir Paul Lever
- 2003–2007: Sir Peter Torry
- 2007–2010: Sir Michael Arthur
- 2010–2015: Sir Simon McDonald
- 2015–2020: Sir Sebastian Wood
- 2020–2024: Jill Gallard
- 2024-: Andrew Mitchell
