= List of ambassadors of the United Kingdom to the Netherlands =

UK Ambassador to the Netherlands
- Royal arms of His Majesty's Government
- Incumbent; Chris Rampling since July 2025
- Foreign, Commonwealth and Development Office; British Embassy, The Hague
- Style: His Excellency
- Reports to: Secretary of State for Foreign, Commonwealth and Development Affairs
- Seat: The Hague, Netherlands
- Appointer: The Crown on advice of the prime minister
- Term length: At His Majesty's pleasure
- Website: British Embassy – The Hague

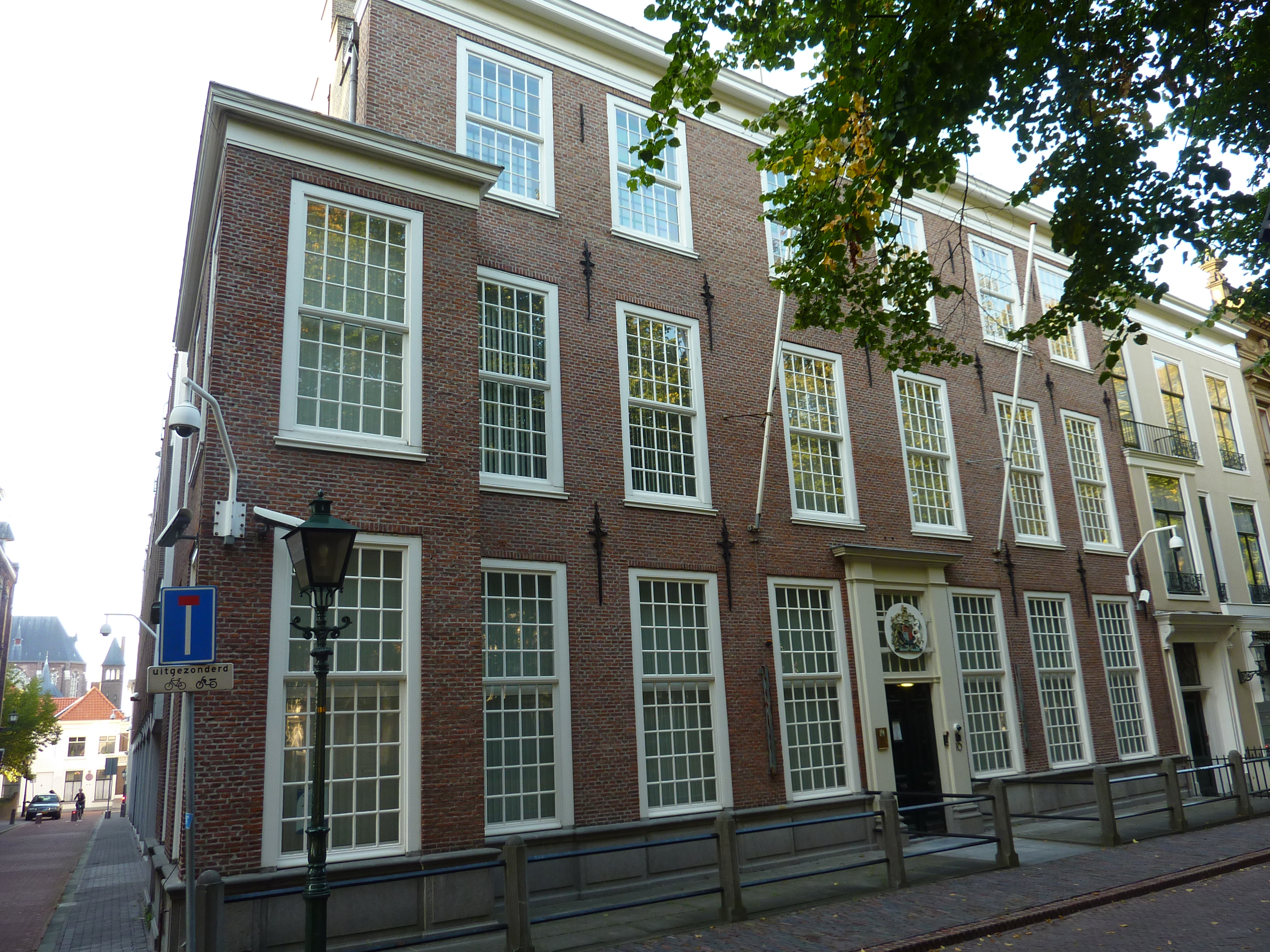
British Embassy, The Hague

The British ambassador to the Netherlands is the United Kingdom's foremost diplomatic representative in the Netherlands, and head of the UK's diplomatic mission in the Netherlands. The official title is His Britannic Majesty's Ambassador to the Kingdom of the Netherlands.

Since the formation in 1997 of the Organisation for the Prohibition of Chemical Weapons (OPCW), which is located in The Hague, the British ambassador to the Netherlands has also been the UK's permanent representative to the OPCW, assisted by a chemical weapons team at the embassy.

Besides the embassy in The Hague, the UK also maintains a consulate general in Amsterdam.

== List of heads of mission ==
=== Envoys to the Prince of Orange ===
- 1575−1578: Daniel Rogers Agent and Special agent 1578–1579
  - 1575−1576: Robert Corbet Special Ambassador
  - 1577: Philip Sidney Special Ambassador
- 1577−1579: William Davison Resident agent; Special Ambassador 1584–1585; English Councillor 1585−1586
- 1585−1586: Henry Killigrew and Dr Bartholomew Clerke English Councillors on the Dutch Council of State
- 1586−1587: Thomas Wilkes Special Ambassador then English Councillor on the Dutch Council of State; also 1578, 1582, and 1590
- 1587−1589: Henry Killigrew English Councillor on the Dutch Council of State
- 1588−1593: Thomas Bodley English Councillor on the Dutch Council of State; again 1594−1596
- 1593−1602: George Gilpin English Councillor on the Dutch Council of State

=== Ambassadors to the United Provinces ===
- 1603–1613: Sir Ralph Winwood Agent 1603–1607; Commissioner (with Spencer) 1607–1609; then Resident ambassador
- 1607–1609: Sir Richard Spencer Commissioner (with Winwood)
- 1614–1615: Sir Henry Wotton
- 1615–1625 and 1626–1628: Sir Dudley Carleton
  - 1625: George Villiers, 1st Duke of Buckingham Ambassador Extraordinary
- 1625–1632: Dudley Carleton, his nephew Chargé d'Affaires; then Agent
- 1632–1649: Sir William Boswell Agent until 1634; then Ambassador
- 1642–1650: Walter Strickland Ambassador (appointed by Parliament)
  - 1644: Henry Jermyn, 1st Baron Jermyn Ambassador
- No representation due to the First Anglo-Dutch War 1652–1654
- 1657–1665: Sir George Downing
- No representation due to the Second Anglo-Dutch War 1665–1667
- 1668–1670: Sir William Temple, Bt
- 1671–1672: William Blathwayt Chargé d'Affaires

No representation due to the Third Anglo-Dutch War 1672–1674

- 1674–1679: Sir William Temple, Bt
- 1678–1679: Roger Meredith Chargé d'Affaires
- 1679–1681: Henry Sidney

=== Envoys extraordinary and ministers plenipotentiary to the United Provinces ===
- 1681–1682: Thomas Plott Agent
- 1681–1685: Thomas Chudleigh
- 1685–1686: Bevil Skelton Ambassador
- 1686–1688: Ignatius White

=== Ambassadors to the United Provinces ===
- 1689: Thomas Herbert, Earl of Pembroke
- 1689–1695: Charles Berkeley, Viscount Dursley Envoy Extraordinary
  - 1690: William Harbord
- 1695–1697: Edward Villiers, 1st Viscount Villiers
- 1697–1699: Sir Joseph Williamson
- 1700–1706: Alexander Stanhope Envoy Extraordinary
  - 1701 and 1702–1712: John Churchill, 1st Duke of Marlborough
  - 1706–1712: James Dayrolle Resident
- 1706–1707: George Stepney Envoy Extraordinary (but rarely at The Hague)
- 1707–1709: William Cadogan Envoy Extraordinary (but rarely at The Hague)
- 1709–1711: Charles Townshend, 2nd Viscount Townshend
- 1711: Charles Boyle, Earl of Orrery Envoy Extraordinary
- 1711–1714: Thomas Wentworth, 1st Earl of Strafford
- 1714–1720 William Cadogan, 1st Earl Cadogan Envoy Extraordinary until 1716 then Ambassador
  - Jan – Apr 1715 and Oct 1715–Oct 1716: Horatio Walpole
  - 1717: William Leathes seconded as Resident from his post in Brussels
  - 1717–1721: Charles Whitworth Envoy Extraordinary 1717; then Minister Plenipotentiary (seconded from his post in Berlin)
  - 1717–1739: James Dayrolle Resident

=== Envoys extraordinary and ministers plenipotentiary to the United Provinces ===
- May-Jul 1722: Horatio Walpole Minister Plenipotentiary
- 1724–1728: William Finch Envoy Extraordinary
- 1728–1732: Philip Stanhope, 4th Earl of Chesterfield Ambassador
- 1733–1734: William Finch Minister Plenipotentiary
- 1734–1739: Horatio Walpole Minister 1734; then Envoy Extraordinary (absent 1736-Jun 1739)
- 1736–1746: Robert Trevor (Secretary 1736–1736; then Envoy Extraordinary until 1741, then also Minister Plenipotentiary)
  - 1742–1743: John Dalrymple, 2nd Earl of Stair Ambassador
  - 1745: Philip Stanhope, Earl of Chesterfield
- 1746–1749: John Montagu, Earl of Sandwich Minister Plenipotentiary
  - 1747–1752: Solomon Dayrolles Resident
- 1749–1751: Robert Darcy, 4th Earl of Holderness Minister Plenipotentiary
- 1751–1780: Joseph Yorke Minister Plenipotentiary until 1761 then Ambassador

No representation due to the Fourth Anglo-Dutch War 1780–1784

- 1784–1789: Sir James Harris Minister Plenipotentiary until 1788; then (as Lord Malmesbury) Ambassador
- 1789–1790: Alleyne FitzHerbert Envoy Extraordinary
- 1790–1793: William Eden, 1st Baron Auckland (ambassador)
  - 1790–1793: Lord Henry John Spencer Secretary, but Minister ad interim 1791–1792 and 1793
- 1793–1794: Hon. William Eliot Minister ad interim
- 1794–1795: Alleyne FitzHerbert

Diplomatic relations suspended 1795–1802

=== Envoys extraordinary and ministers plenipotentiary to the Batavian Republic ===
- 1802–1803: Robert Liston

Diplomatic Relations suspended 1803–1813

=== Ambassadors to the United Kingdom of the Netherlands ===
Under the Treaty of Vienna in 1815, the northern and southern Netherlands were united into the United Kingdom of the Netherlands.

- 1813–1815: Richard Trench, 2nd Earl of Clancarty
- 1815: Sir Charles Stuart
- 1815–1816: Mr John James Minister ad interim
- 1816–1817: Mr George William Chad Minister ad interim
- 1817–1824: Richard Trench, 2nd Earl of Clancarty
- 1818–1819, 1819, 1822 and 1824: Mr George William Chad Minister ad interim
- 1824: Granville Leveson-Gower, 1st Viscount Granville
- 1824: Sir Andrew Snape Douglas (ad interim)
- 1824–1829: Sir Charles Bagot
- 1829–1832: Sir Thomas Cartwright (ad interim)

The United Kingdom of the Netherlands was dissolved by the secession of the Southern Netherlands in the Belgian Revolution

=== Envoys extraordinary and ministers plenipotentiary to the Netherlands ===
- 1832: Hon. John Duncan Bligh (ad interim)
- 1833–1836: Hon. George Jerningham Chargé d'affaires
- 1836–1851: Sir Edward Cromwell Disbrowe
- 1851–1858: Sir Ralph Abercromby
- 1858–1860: Francis Napier, 10th Lord Napier
- 1860–1862: Sir Andrew Buchanan
- 1862–1867: Sir John Ralph Milbanke, 8th Bt
- 1867–1877: Hon. Edward Harris
- 1877–1888: Hon. William Stuart
- 1888–1896: Sir Horace Rumbold, 8th Bt
- 1896–1908: Sir Henry Howard
- 1908–1910: Sir George Buchanan
- 1910–1917: Hon. Sir Alan Johnstone
- 1917–1919: Sir Walter Townley
- 1919–1921: Sir Ronald Graham
- 1921–1926: Sir Charles Marling
- 1926–1928: Granville Leveson-Gower, 3rd Earl Granville
- 1928–1933: Hon. Sir Odo Russell
- 1933–1938: Sir Hubert Montgomery
- 1938–1942: Sir Nevile Bland

=== Ambassadors to the Netherlands ===
- 1942–1948: Sir Nevile Bland
- 1948–1952: Sir Philip Nichols
- 1952–1954: Sir Nevile Butler
- 1954–1960: Sir Paul Mason
- 1960–1964: Sir Andrew Noble
- 1964–1970: Sir Peter Garran
- 1970–1972: Sir Edward Tomkins
- 1972–1977: Sir John Barnes
- 1977–1979: Sir Richard Sykes
- 1979–1981: Sir Jock Taylor
- 1981–1984: Sir Philip Mansfield
- 1984–1988: Sir John Margetson
- 1988–1993: Sir Michael Jenkins
- 1993–1996: Sir David Miers
- 1996–2001: Dame Rosemary Spencer
- 2001–2005: Sir Colin Budd
- 2005–2009: Mr Lyn Parker
- 2009–2013: Mr Paul Arkwright
- 2013–2017: Sir Geoffrey Adams
- 2017–2020: Hon. Peter Wilson
- 2020–2025: Joanna Roper
- 2025–present: Chris Rampling

== See also ==
- Netherlands – United Kingdom relations
