= List of ambassadors of Great Britain to Russia =

Ambassador of Great Britain to Russia
- Arms of Great Britain
- Style: His Excellency
- Appointer: The monarch
- Inaugural holder: Charles Townshend, Viscount Townshend; First Ambassador of Great Britain to France (Plenipotentiary)
- Final holder: James Harris, Baron Malmesbury; Last Ambassador of Great Britain to France (Plenipotentiary)

The ambassador of Great Britain to Russia was the foremost diplomatic representative in Russia of the Kingdom of Great Britain, a state created in 1707 by the Union of England and Scotland. The British ambassador was the head of the diplomatic mission in Russia. The Embassy was a prestigious posting in the British foreign service.

For ambassadors up to 1707, see List of ambassadors of the Kingdom of England to Russia. For ambassadors after 1800, see List of ambassadors of the United Kingdom to Russia.

== Minister and Ambassador ==
- 1707–1712: Charles Goodfellow Minister and Consul-General (previously Minister to Russia of the Kingdom of England, 1699–1707).
- 1707–1712: Charles Whitworth, Envoy of the Kingdom of England 1704–1707 and of Great Britain, 1707–1709; Ambassador extraordinary 1709–1711; Ambassador extraordinary and plenipotentiary 1711–1712

=== Ministers Resident ===
- 1714–1719: Friedrich Christian Weber
- 1714–1715: George Mackenzie-Quin
- 1715–1716: James Haldane Minister Resident
- 1716: George Douglas, 2nd Earl of Dumbarton
- 1718–1721: James Jeffreys (retired to Dantzig in 1719)
- 1719–1730: No diplomatic relations
- 1728–1731: Thomas Ward
- 1731: John Campbell, 3rd Earl of Breadalbane and Holland
- 1731–1739: Claudius Rondeau Consul-General 1730–1731; Minister Resident
  - 1733–1734: George, Lord Forbes Minister Plenipotentiary to negotiate a commercial treaty

=== Envoys Extraordinary and Plenipotentiary ===
- 1739–1742: Edward Finch
- 1741–1744: Cyril Wich or Wyche, Bt Envoy Extraordinary 1741–1742; then Envoy Extraordinary and Plenipotentiary
- 1744–1749: John Carmichael, 3rd Earl of Hyndford Minister Plenipotentiary 1744–1745; then Ambassador Extraordinary and Plenipotentiary
- 1749–1755: Melchior Guy Dickens
- 1755–1759: Charles Hanbury Williams Ambassador Plenipotentiary
- 1759–1762: Robert Murray Keith the Elder (d. 1774)
- 1762–1765: John Hobart, 2nd Earl of Buckinghamshire Ambassador Extraordinary
- 1764–1767: George Macartney, 1st Earl Macartney Envoy Extraordinary
- 1766–1767: Rt. Hon. Hans Stanley (never went to Russia)
- 1767–1768: Henry Shirley Secretary in charge or agent
- 1768–1772: Charles Cathcart, 9th Lord Cathcart Ambassador Extrraordinary
- 1772–1775: Robert Gunning
- 1776–1783: Sir James Harris
- 1783–1788: Alleyne FitzHerbert
- 1788–1800: Charles Whitworth
  - 1791: William Fawkener Special Mission

1800–1801: Diplomatic relations were suspended during the Second League of Armed Neutrality
