= List of diplomats of the United Kingdom to the Elector of Cologne =

This article consists of a list of diplomats from the United Kingdom to the Elector of Cologne. For considerable periods, the United Kingdom and its predecessors maintained no continuous mission to the Elector.

== Heads of Mission ==
- 1695–1696: George Stepney Envoy Extraordinary
- 1696–1745: No regular mission
  - 1726: Isaac Leheup Minister (did not reach Cologne).
  - 1743: Hon. Thomas Villiers, British Envoy to Saxony and Poland was also accredited to many states of the Holy Roman Empire
- 1745–1758: Onslow Burrish Minister, also to Bavaria and other states
- 1755–1781: George Cressner Minister to the City of Cologne until 1763, then Minister Plenipotentiary to the Elector, but residing at Maastricht 1759–1763, due to French occupation of Cologne.
- 1781–1801: Ralph Heathcote senior Minister Plenipotentiary, left Bonn in 1794 with the Elector
- 1801–1806: Brook Taylor Minister Plenipotentiary, but did not visit Bonn or present his credentials

The Elector's lands west of the Rhine were occupied by the French in 1795 and annexed. The Archbishopric was left vacant on the death of the Elector in 1805. The lands east of the Rhine were secularised as the Duchy of Westphalia in 1803, which was given to the Landgrave of Hesse-Darmstadt.
