= Stratford Canning, 1st Viscount Stratford de Redcliffe =

British diplomat

The Right Honourable The Viscount Stratford de Redcliffe KG GCB PC
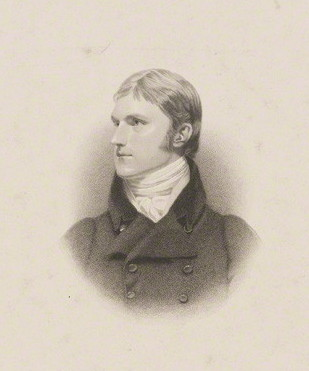
- Lord Stratford de Redcliffe in 1814, aged 29.

British Ambassador to the Ottoman Empire
- In office 1841–1858
- Monarch: Queen Victoria
- Preceded by: Sir John Ponsonby
- Succeeded by: Sir Henry Bulwer
- In office 1825–1828
- Monarch: George IV
- Preceded by: The Viscount Strangford
- Succeeded by: Sir Robert Gordon

Member of the House of Lords
- Lord Temporal
- In office 24 April 1852 – 14 August 1880
- Preceded by: Peerage created
- Succeeded by: Peerage extinct

Personal details
- Born: 4 November 1786
- Died: 14 August 1880 (aged 93)
- Spouse(s): (1) Harriet Raikes (d. 1817) (2) Eliza Charlotte Alexander (1805–1882)
- Education: King's College, Cambridge

Stratford Canning, 1st Viscount Stratford de Redcliffe (4 November 1786 – 14 August 1880), was a British diplomat who became best known as the longtime British Ambassador to the Ottoman Empire. A cousin of George Canning, he served as Envoy Extraordinary and Minister-Plenipotentiary to the United States between 1820 and 1824 and held his first appointment as Ambassador to the Ottoman Empire between 1825 and 1828.

He intermittently represented several constituencies in parliament between 1828 and 1842. In 1841 he was re-appointed as Ambassador to the Ottoman Empire, serving in the position from January 1842 to 1858. In 1852 he was elevated to the peerage as Viscount Stratford de Redcliffe. Canning's hopes of high political office were repeatedly dashed.

== Background and education ==
Canning was the youngest of the five children of Stratford Canning (1744–1787), an Irish-born merchant based in London, by his wife Mehitabel, daughter of Robert Patrick. He was born at his father's house of business in St. Clement's Lane, in the heart of London. In 1787, when he was 6 months old, Canning's father died so his mother and siblings went to live in a cottage at Wanstead, where he would holiday for the rest of his life. Mehitabel Canning continued her husband's business until her eldest son could take her place. His eldest brother Henry Canning became British Consul in Hamburg in 1823, a posting he retained for the rest of his life. Henry Canning died at Hamburg in 1841. Another brother, William Canning (1778–1860), was a Canon of Windsor from 1828 to 1860, while another brother, Charles Fox Canning (1784–1815), was at the time of his death a lieutenant colonel to the Guards, aide-de-camp to the Duke of Wellington at the battle of Waterloo. He was also a first cousin of prime minister George Canning and Lord Garvagh. He was educated at Eton and King's College, Cambridge.

His mother was a widow with little money, but powerful relatives especially George Canning. Stratford Canning began his education at a Dame's school at the age of four. At the age of 6 he left to attend Mr. Newcome's school in Hackney. Thanks to help from George Canning, he attended Eton for ten years, then King's College, Cambridge, in 1806–1807.

== Diplomatic career, 1807–1831 ==
In 1807, Canning was given a minor role in the Foreign Office by his cousin (as deputy to Col. Norton Powlett, Clerk of the Signet), and was sent with Anthony Merry on a mission to Denmark later that year. His first trip to Constantinople came in 1808, when he accompanied the mission of Robert Adair that restored peace between Britain and the Turks. When Adair left Constantinople in 1810, Canning became Minister Plenipotentiary, and it was Canning who helped mediate the Treaty of Bucharest between the Ottomans and Russia on 28 May 1812.

Canning returned to London later that year, and helped to found the Quarterly Review. In June 1814 he was appointed Envoy Extraordinary and Minister-Plenipotentiary to Switzerland, where he, along with the other allied representatives, helped negotiate Swiss neutrality and a new Swiss federal constitution. In October he went to Vienna, where he acted as an aid to Lord Castlereagh, the British representative at the Congress of Vienna. After the negotiation of Swiss neutrality in 1815, Canning's role there became dull to him, but he stayed until 1819, when he was recalled and sent to Washington as Envoy Extraordinary and Minister-Plenipotentiary to the United States. Although he hoped for major accomplishments in Washington that would allow him to move up to a larger position, he was largely unsuccessful. The initiative of his cousin George, this time as Foreign Secretary, for a joint Anglo-American guarantee of Latin American independence, led to the promulgation of the Monroe Doctrine. In 1820 Canning was made a member of the Privy Council.

Canning returned to London in 1823, and the next year was sent on a mission to Russia, where he negotiated a treaty on the border between Russian and British North America, but failed to come to any agreement regarding the Greek Revolt. Later in February 1825 he concluded a treaty with Russia on the north-west American frontier (the treaty of Saint Petersburg).

In 1825, Canning was returned to Constantinople, this time as Ambassador. He fled the city following the Battle of Navarino in 1827, but after a brief return to London he, along with the French and Russian ambassadors who had also fled, set up camp at Poros. In 1828 he and the other ambassadors participated in the Conference of Poros, which recommended to their respective governments the establishment of a separate Greek state, including the islands of Crete, Samos, and Euboea. Although he had been encouraged in this generous position towards the Greeks by his superior, Lord Aberdeen, this move was disavowed by the government, and Canning resigned.

== Diplomatic career, 1831–1841 ==
Following his return, Canning attempted to enter British politics, entering the House of Commons in 1831, but was not a particularly notable figure in the Commons. When the Whigs entered office and the Canningite Lord Palmerston became British foreign secretary, Canning returned again to Constantinople in 1831, but returned in 1832, disapproving of Palmerston's lack of consultation with him and the choice of Prince Otto of Bavaria as King of Greece. That year, he was appointed Ambassador to Russia, but never took the office, as Tsar Nicholas I refused to receive him.

Canning was, however, sent on a new diplomatic mission, to Madrid, where he was to deal with the rival claimants to the Portuguese throne, but was largely unsuccessful. He turned again, attempting again to pursue a course in domestic politics, associating himself with Lord Stanley's band of renegade Whigs, but when Stanley's followers entered government with Sir Robert Peel in 1841, Canning again was not offered a post. Going to Lord Aberdeen, the new Foreign Secretary, with whom his relations remained ambiguous, Canning was this time offered the Constantinople embassy.

== Ambassador to Constantinople, 1842–1858 ==
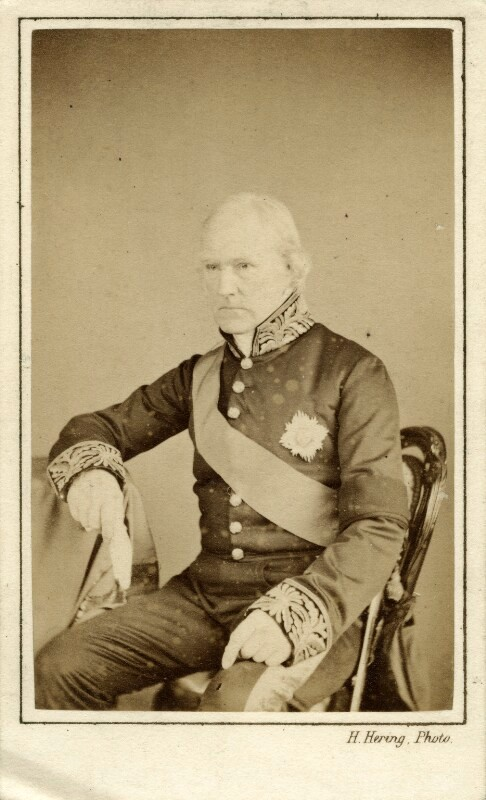
Stratford Canning circa 1860

Canning's term in Constantinople lasted from 1842 to 1852. When Canning's old ally Stanley, now Earl of Derby, formed a government in 1852, Canning hoped to receive the foreign office, or at least the Paris embassy. Instead, he was raised to the peerage as Viscount Stratford de Redcliffe, in the County of Somerset. He returned home in 1852, but when Aberdeen's coalition government was formed, Stratford de Redcliffe was returned to Constantinople.

In Constantinople for the last time, Stratford came in the midst of a crisis caused by the dispute between Napoleon III and Nicholas I over the protection of the holy places. This crisis ultimately led to the Crimean War. Stratford is accused of encouraging the Turks to reject the compromise agreement during the Menshikov mission. It appears that he was consistently urging the Turks to reject compromises arguing that any Russian treaty, or facsimile thereof, would be to subject the Ottoman Empire to protectorate status under Tsar Nicholas I. He left Constantinople for the last time in 1857, and resigned early the next year.

== Retirement ==
For the next twenty-two years Lord Stratford de Redcliffe lived in retirement, pursuing scholarly activities and deeply bored by his absence from public life. He attended the House of Lords regularly and spoke frequently on foreign policy matters as a cross-bencher. In 1869 he was made a Knight of the Garter. During the Eastern Crisis of the 1870s, Stratford wrote frequent letters in The Times on the subject.

In September 1876, William Ewart Gladstone dedicated his pamphlet "Bulgarian Horrors and the Question of the East" to him.

== Family ==
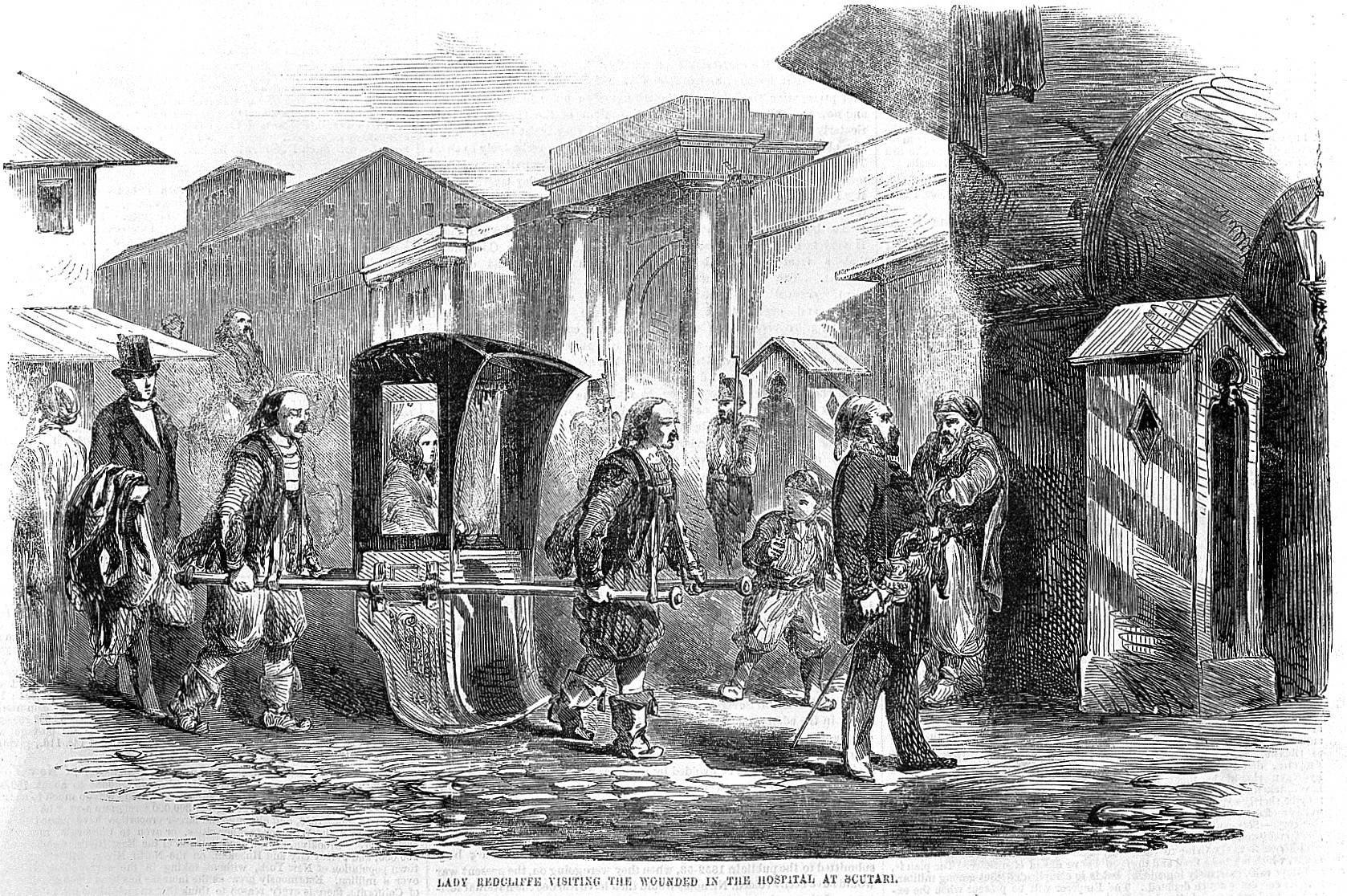
An illustration of the second Lady Stratford de Redcliffe visiting a hospital in Üsküdar, which at the time was known as Scutari.

Lord Stratford de Redcliffe was twice married. His first wife, Harriet daughter of Thomas Raikes and his wife Harriet, died in childbirth in her 27th year at Lausanne on June 17, 1817. His second wife, Eliza Charlotte Alexander (1805–1882), bore him (at least) five children of whom four survived to adulthood. These were:

- Hon. Louisa Charlotte Canning (1828–1908)
- Hon. George Stratford Canning (1832–1878)
- Hon. Catherine Jane Canning (1835–1884)
- Hon. Mary Elizabeth Canning (1837–1905)

All his children died unmarried. Lord Stratford de Redcliffe himself died at the age of 93 in 1880, his peerage becoming extinct. He is buried underneath a large very grey monument on the western side of the grave yard at Frant in Sussex, England.

== Reputation ==
As ambassador to the Sublime Porte of the Ottoman Sultan, Stratford Canning played a major role in high level diplomacy, since Britain was the chief supporter, advocate and protector of the Ottoman Empire. Winston Churchill said he had "a wider knowledge of Turkey than any other Englishmen of his day," Alfred, Lord Tennyson, said he was "the voice of England in the East." The Turks called him "the Great Ambassador."

== Portraits ==
In 1879, by then an invalid aged over ninety, Stratford de Redcliffe was painted by Hubert Herkomer for King's College, Cambridge. Herkomer painted him in a black coat, wearing his Orders, and later recalled that he had found Stratford de Redcliffe "still vigorous in mind, dwelling chiefly on subjects of a poetic and philosophical nature." On one occasion, the sun had caught a cloth shoe on a gouty foot, and Stratford de Redcliffe had commented that it was "kind of old Phoebus to shine on an old boot."

== Arms ==
Coat of arms of Stratford Canning, 1st Viscount Stratford de Redcliffe
Crest A demi-lion rampant Argent charged with three trefoils Vert holding in the dexter paw an arrow point downwards. Escutcheon Quarterly 1st & 4th Argent three Moors' heads couped in profile Proper wreathed round the temples Argent and Azure 2nd Gules three spear heads palewise in fess Argent 3rd Gules a goat salient Or. Supporters Two lions Argent collared Or on the shoulder of each a shield charged with three trefoils. Motto Ne Cede Malis Sed Contra

== See also ==
- International relations of the Great Powers (1814–1919)
- History of the foreign relations of the United Kingdom
- Ottoman Reform Edict of 1856

Parliament of the United Kingdom
Preceded by James Alexander; Josias Alexander	Member of Parliament for Old Sarum; With: James Alexander	Succeeded by James Alexander; Josias Alexander
Preceded by George Wilbraham; William Sloane-Stanley	Member of Parliament for Stockbridge; 1831–1832; With: John Foster-Barham	Constituency abolished
Preceded by Lord George Bentinck; Lord William Lennox	Member of Parliament for King's Lynn; 1835–1842; With: Lord George Bentinck	Succeeded by Lord George Bentinck; Viscount Jocelyn
Diplomatic posts
New post	Envoy Extraordinary and Minister Plenipotentiary to the Swiss Cantons; 1814–1820	Succeeded by William Disbrowe (as Chargé d'Affaires)
Preceded by Hon. Sir Charles Bagot	Envoy Extraordinary and Minister Plenipotentiary to the United States; 1820–1824	Succeeded by Sir Charles Richard Vaughan
Preceded by The Viscount Strangford	British Ambassador to the Ottoman Empire; 1825–1828	Succeeded by Sir Robert Gordon
New post	British Ambassador to Greece; 1828–1833	Succeeded by Edward Dawkins
Preceded by Sir William à Court, Bt	British Ambassador to the Russian Empire (nominally, but did not go; Hon. John Duncan Bligh was Minister-Plenipotentiary ad interim); 1832–1833	Succeeded by The Earl of Durham
Preceded by Sir John Ponsonby	British Ambassador to the Ottoman Empire; 1841–1858	Succeeded by Sir Henry Bulwer
Honorary titles
Preceded by The Earl of Roden	Senior Privy Counsellor; 1870–1880	Succeeded by The Marquess of Donegall
Peerage of the United Kingdom
New creation	Viscount Stratford de Redcliffe; 1852–1880; Member of the House of Lords (1852–1880)	Extinct
