= List of diplomats of the United Kingdom to Bavaria =

Below is an incomplete list of diplomats from the United Kingdom to Bavaria, specifically Heads of Missions sent after the creation of the Kingdom of Bavaria in 1805, when diplomatic relations began in 1814 after the Napoleonic Wars. Before the Napoleonic War, Great Britain maintained a diplomatic mission to the Elector of Bavaria and (from 1777) to the Elector of the Palatinate following his succession to the Duchy of Bavaria. This was often commonly combined with a mission to the Imperial Diet in Regensburg (Ratisbon).

== Heads of Missions ==
=== Envoys Extraordinary and Ministers Plenipotentiary ===
==== To the Imperial Diet ====
- 1639 Sir William Curtius Nürnberg
- 1642 Sir William Curtius Frankfurt
- 1649 Sir William Curtius Nürnberg
- 1689–c1694: Hugo Hughes Secretary
- c.1694–1702: probably no mission
- 1702–1704: Charles Whitworth Resident
- 1707: Henry Davenant did not visit Ratisbon
- 1714–1716: Charles Whitworth, Envoy Extraordinary until 1710
- 1724–1725: Edward Finch

==== To Elector of Bavaria and to the Imperial Diet ====
- 1726–1727: Isaac Leheup Minster
- 1727–1745: no mission
  - 1745: Thomas Robinson Envoy Extraordinary for special mission
- 1746–1758: Onslow Burrish Minister to Bavaria; also accredited to Diet 1750–1751
- 1758–1763: No representation due to Seven Years' War (probably)
- 1763: Philip Stanhope
- 1764–1765: William Gordon Envoy Extraordinary to Diet only
- 1765–1769: Fulke Greville Envoy Extraordinary to Bavaria; Minister to Diet
- 1769–1773: Lewis de Visme Minister Plenipotentary to Bavaria; Minister to Diet
- 1773–1776: Hugh Elliot Minister Plenipotentary to Bavaria; Minister to Diet
- 1776–1779: Morton Eden

==== Ministers Plenipotentiary to Elector Palatine and Ministers to the Imperial Diet ====
- 1780–1783: Hon. John Trevor
- 1783–1796: Thomas Walpole
  - 1794–1798: Richard Shepherd Chargé d'Affaires
- 1798–1799: Hon. Arthur Paget
- 1799–1800: Robert Walrond Chargé d'Affaires
- 1800: William Wickham Plenipotentary
- 1799–1804: Francis Drake

==== To King of Bavaria ====
- 1804–1814: No diplomatic relations due to Napoleonic War
- 1814–1815: George Rose
- 1815–1820: Hon. Frederick Lamb
- 1820–1828: Brook Taylor
- 1828–1843: David Erskine, 2nd Baron Erskine
- 1843–1862: John Milbanke
- 1862–1866: Lord Augustus Loftus
- 1866–1871: Sir Henry Howard

Bavaria joined the German Empire in 1871 and the Head of Mission was relegated to Chargé d'affaires

=== Chargés d'affaires ===
- 1872–1876: Robert Morier
- 1876–1882: Sir Edward Stanton
- 1882–1885: Hugh MacDonell
- 1885–1903: Sir Victor Drummond

In 1903, the Head of Mission was promoted to Minister Resident and merged with that of Württemberg

=== Ministers resident ===
- 1903–1906: Sir Reginald Tower
- 1906–1908: Hon. Fairfax Cartwright
  - 1908–1909: Lord Horace Rumbold Chargé d'Affaires
- 1909–1910: Sir Ralph Paget
- 1910–1914: Sir Vincent Corbett
