= Charles Whitworth =

Charles Whitworth may refer to

- Charles Whitworth, 1st Baron Whitworth (1675–1725), British diplomat and MP for Newport Isle of Wight (1722–1725)
- Sir Charles Whitworth (MP) (c. 1721–1778), his nephew and a British MP
- Charles Whitworth, 1st Earl Whitworth (1752–1825), British diplomat and politician, also Barons Whitworth of Newport Pratt and Viscount Whitworth
