= Hugh Elliot =

British diplomat and colonial administrator (1752–1830)

The Right Honourable Hugh Elliot
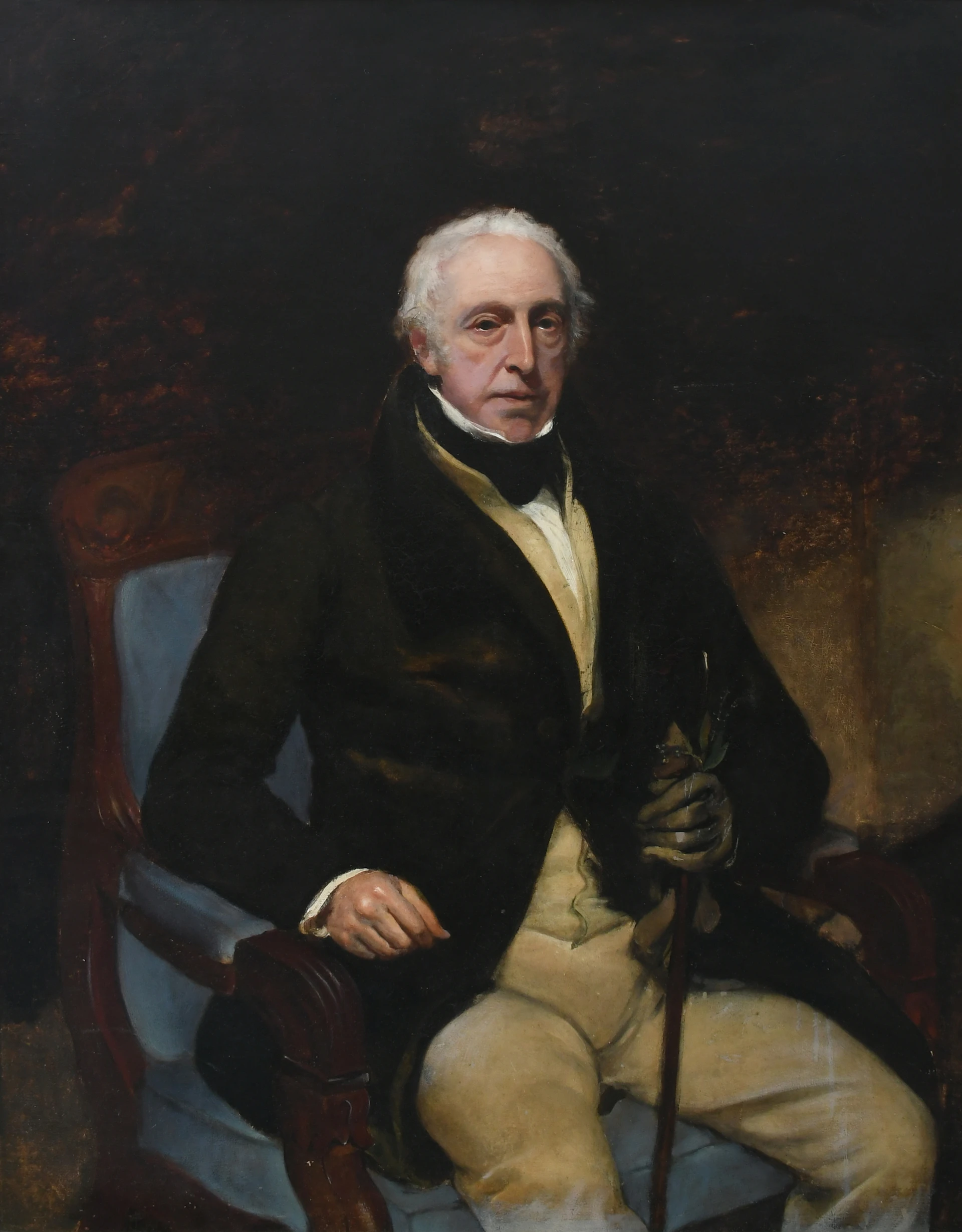
- Portrait by the circle of Sir Henry Raeburn, 1809–1814

Governor of the Leeward Islands
- In office 1809–1814

Governor of Madras
- In office 1814–1820

Personal details
- Born: 6 April 1752 Edinburgh, Scotland
- Died: 1 December 1830 (aged 78) Somerset Street, London
- Resting place: Westminster Abbey, London
- Spouse(s): Charlotte Louisa von Kraut (1778–1783); Margaret Jones (−1819)
- Children: 10
- Parent(s): Sir Gilbert Elliot, 3rd Baronet, of Minto; Agnes Dalrymple-Murray-Kynymound
- Profession: Diplomat

Hugh Elliot (6 April 1752 – 1 December 1830) was a British diplomat and colonial administrator.

== Education and early career ==
Hugh Elliot was born on 6 April 1752, the second son of Sir Gilbert Elliot, and the younger brother of Gilbert Elliot-Murray-Kynynmound, 1st Earl of Minto. His mother was the heiress of Hugh Dalrymple-Murray-Kynynmound. Hugh and Gilbert were educated together, first by private tutor, and later between 1764 and 1766 in Paris, where they were mentored by Scottish philosopher and historian David Hume and where Hugh struck up a friendship with Count Mirabeau. In 1768, at the age of 16, Hugh entered Christ Church, University of Oxford, but left after only two years to complete his military education at Metz.

After that, at the still young age of 18, Hugh Elliot took a commission in the Russian army as an officer, and fought in the campaign against the Turks in the Balkans. According to family papers, at one point Elliot was forced to swim in the Danube holding on to the tail of a horse ridden by a Cossack.

== Diplomatic career ==
At 21, largely through his father's influence, he took up a diplomatic post as the British Minister Plenipotentiary to the Duchy of Bavaria. Four years later, he was named as the British ambassador to Frederick the Great in Prussia. He developed a reputation as a great social wit, but worked hard to defeat the entreaties of American diplomats during the American Revolutionary War (including, allegedly, at one point stealing the American dispatch box and copying its contents).

In Berlin he married his first wife, Charlotte von Kraut, but when she committed adultery he challenged her lover to a duel. He himself was wounded in the duel, but received a written apology from his protagonist. The scandal was to later haunt him during his career, and is most often cited as the reason why, despite an exceptional career in the diplomatic service, he never received the customary knighthood.

Elliot then served in Copenhagen 1782–1791, during which time his reputation soared as he was credited for stopping war between Sweden and Denmark, and for helping Gustav III reintroduce absolutism in Sweden. Shortly after arriving at Copenhagen, he heard reports of the continued infidelity of his wife, who had remained in Berlin with their daughter. He decided that he would not allow their child to stay with her mother, and managed to personally carry out an abduction of her from Berlin, and bring her back to Copenhagen with him.

In 1792, Elliot was named as British ambassador to the Electorate of Saxony in Dresden. Shortly prior to that he married his second wife, Margaret Jones, who was 20 years his junior.

In 1803 Elliot was sent to Naples which was then the capital of the Kingdom of Naples, where he survived in tempestuous circumstances until his recall in 1806. After his recall, the family endured a period of considerable financial hardship when no postings were found for the diplomat for a period of three years but upon the death of Lord Lavington, Elliot was appointed to serve as Governor of the Leeward Islands in the British West Indies from 1809 to 1814.

Elliot was a noted abolitionist. Whilst Governor of the Leeward islands, he was reported to be the driving force behind the arrest, trial and execution of Arthur Hodge for the murder of a slave in the British Virgin Islands. His brother-in-law, William Eden, 1st Baron Auckland presented the bill which would become the Slave Trade Act 1807 before the House of Lords.

In 1814, he was made a Privy Counsellor. From 1814 to 1820, Elliot was Governor of Madras.

== Family ==
Elliot married twice:

1) in 1778 divorced 1783, Charlotte von Kraut with one daughter

- Isabella Elliot (married George Payne 1810, died 1826)

2) in c 1792, Margaret Jones (died 2 March 1819), with nine children:

- Theodore Henry Elliot (died 2 April 1842)
- Emma Elliot (died 10 August 1866), who married Sir Thomas Hislop, 1st Baronet
- Edward Francis Elliot (died 11 June 1866)
- Caroline Elliot
- Hugh Maximilian Elliot (cir 1798 – died 1 January 1826 Calcutta, India)
- Harriet Agnes Elliot (died 17 April 1845), who married Admiral Sir James Hanway Plumridge MP.
- Gilbert Elliot (17 Mar 1800 – 11 August 1891)
- Charles Elliot (1801-9 Sep 1875)
- Thomas Frederick Elliot (15 Jul 1808 – 12 February 1880), secretary to the Government Commission upon Emigration in 1831–1832 and Agent General for Emigration from 1837 to 1840.

It has been asserted in several publications that the ill-fated vessel Lady Elliot (and, afterwards, Lady Elliot Island in Queensland), had been named after Margaret Elliot, but the ship was more likely named after Anna Maria Elliot, the wife of Hugh Elliot's brother, Gilbert, who was Governor-General of India between 1807 and 1813 and also 1st Earl of Minto. Hugh was not knighted or heir to any title of British nobility, and Margaret therefore had no title. Anna Maria (later Lady Elliot) was the daughter of Sir George Amyand, 1st Baronet.

== Death and legacy ==
Elliot died at his home in Somerset Street, London on 1 December 1830, shortly after retiring to bed, and was buried, with his brother, at Westminster Abbey

== See also ==
- Earl of Minto

== Sources ==
- The Hanging of Arthur Hodge, John Andrews (ISBN 0-7388-1931-X)

Diplomatic posts
Preceded by Lewis de Visme	British Minister to Bavaria; 1773–1776	Succeeded by Morton Eden
Preceded by James Harris	British Minister to Prussia; 1776–1782	Succeeded by The Earl of Cholmondeley
Preceded by Morton Eden	British Minister to Denmark; 1782–1789	Succeeded by Daniel Hailes
Preceded by Morton Eden	British Minister to Saxony; 1791–1803	Succeeded by Henry Williams-Wynn
Preceded by William Drummond	British Minister to the Two Sicilies; 1803–1806	Succeeded by Gen. Henry Edward Fox
Government offices
Preceded by Lord Lavington	Governor of the Leeward Islands; 1809–1814	Succeeded by Sir James Leith
Preceded by John Abercromby (acting)	Governor of Madras; 1814–1820	Succeeded by Sir Thomas Munro
