= Herbert Taylor (British Army officer) =

British Army officer (1775–1839)

Lieutenant-General The Right Honourable Sir Herbert Taylor GCB GCH
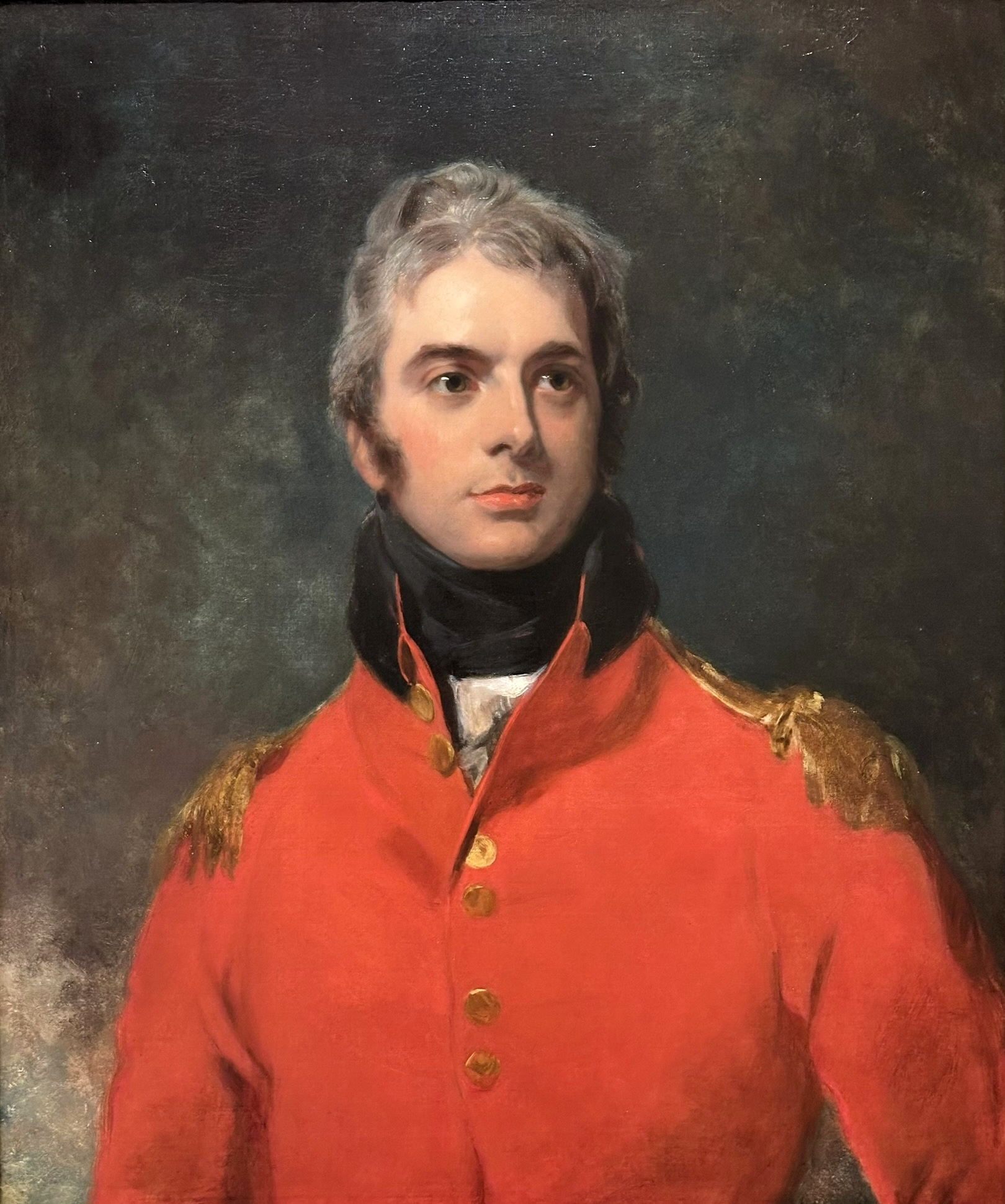
- Portrait by Sir Thomas Lawrence, c. 1800

Private Secretary to the Sovereign
- In office 1830–1837
- Monarch: William IV
- Preceded by: Sir William Knighton, Bt.
- Succeeded by: Prince Albert of Saxe-Coburg and Gotha (unofficial)
- In office 1805–1811
- Monarch: George III
- Preceded by: New post
- Succeeded by: Col. Sir John McMahon, Bt.

Personal details
- Born: 29 September 1775 Bifrons, Kent
- Died: 20 March 1839 (aged 63) Rome

Lieutenant-General Sir Herbert Taylor GCB GCH (29 September 1775 – 20 March 1839) was a British Army officer who served as the first Private Secretary to the Sovereign of the United Kingdom, serving George III, George IV, and William IV.

== Military career ==
Taylor was the son of the Rev. Edward Taylor of Bifrons, Patrixbourne, Kent and his wife Margaret Payler daughter of Thomas Turner Payler of Ileden, who died at Brussels in 1780. The diplomat Sir Brook Taylor was his younger brother. He joined the 2nd Dragoon Guards as a cornet in 1794. Later that year he was promoted to lieutenant and then the following year to captain. In 1795, he served as assistant secretary and aide de camp to the Duke of York, then commander-in-chief of the British Army. Taylor was later the Duke of York's assistant military secretary, an office he held until 1798. He was later a Major. In 1798, he was made Aide de Camp, Military Secretary and Private Secretary to the Marquess Cornwallis, Lord Lieutenant of Ireland. In the following year he returned to the Duke of York's service and remained there until 1805, although he was transferred to the 9th West India Regiment as a lieutenant-colonel in 1801.

However, in the following year, with a period of relative calm in the midst of the Napoleonic Wars, he was placed on half pay. In that year he joined the Coldstream Guards, in which he became a brevet colonel in 1810. In 1805 he became private secretary to King George III, and then, from 1811 private secretary to Queen Charlotte, the queen consort. He retained that office until 1818.

Taylor commanded a brigade at Antwerp 1813–1814, and was sent on a diplomatic mission to Bernadotte of Sweden in 1814. He was Member of Parliament (MP) for Windsor 1820–23. From 1820 to 1827, he was Ambassador to Berlin and then Military Secretary, having become colonel for life of the 85th Foot Regiment in 1823. He was first and principal aide de camp to King George IV in 1827, and also deputy Secretary at War. From 1828 to 1830 he was Adjutant-General to the Forces. He became private secretary to the new king, William IV, in 1830. On the death of the king in 1837 he retired, although he was first and principal aide de camp to Queen Victoria 1837–39.

Taylor became a Major-General in 1813, and a Lieutenant-General in 1825. He was Master of St Katherine's Hospital, Regent's Park, and Master Surveyor and Surveyor-General of the Ordnance from 1828. He died in 1839. The monument to him at St. Katherine's is by the sculptor Peter Rouw.

== Arms ==
Coat of arms of Sir Herbert Taylor
Crest A lion's head erased Argent, collared Gules, charged with three roses of the First. Escutcheon Quarterly; first: Gules, three roses Argent, barbed Vert, a chief Vair (Taylor); second: Argent, a fesse crenellée between three escallop shells Sable (Beckingham); third: Or, a raven Sable (Corbett); fourth: Ermine, on a chief Azure, three lions rampant Or, armed and langued Gules. Motto Fama candida rosa dulcior

Court offices
Preceded by First appointment	Private Secretary to the Sovereign; 1805–1811	Succeeded by Sir John McMahon, Bt
Preceded by The Earl of Effingham	Treasurer to Queen Charlotte; 1817–1818	Death of Queen Charlotte
Parliament of the United Kingdom
Preceded by The Lord Graves	Member of Parliament for Windsor; 1820–1823; With: John Ramsbottom	Succeeded by Edward Cromwell Disbrowe
Military offices
Preceded by Sir Henry Torrens	Military Secretary; 1820–1827	Succeeded by Lord FitzRoy Somerset
Preceded by Sir Henry Torrens	Adjutant General; 1828–1830	Succeeded by Sir John Macdonald
Preceded by Sir Edward Owen	Surveyor-General of the Ordnance; 1828–1829	Succeeded by Henry Fane
Court offices
Preceded by Sir William Knighton, Bt	Private Secretary to the Sovereign; 1830–1837	Succeeded by The Prince Albert, Prince Consort
