= John Duncan Bligh =

British diplomat

The Honourable Sir John Bligh KCB, DL

Minister Plenipotentiary to the Duke of Brunswick
- In office 1847–1856
- Preceded by: Thomas Grenville

Envoy Extraordinary and Minister Plenipotentiary to the King of Hanover
- In office 1838–1856
- Preceded by: The Earl of Clarendon
- Succeeded by: Sir John Fiennes Crampton

Envoy Extraordinary and Minister Plenipotentiary to the King of Sweden and Norway
- In office 1835–1838
- Preceded by: Sir Edward Cromwell Disbrowe
- Succeeded by: Sir Thomas Cartwright

Ambassador Extraordinary and Plenipotentiary to the Emperor of Russia
- In office 1832–1835
- Preceded by: Sir Stratford Canning
- Succeeded by: The Earl of Durham

Envoy Extraordinary and Minister Plenipotentiary to the King of the Netherlands
- In office July 1832 – September 1832
- Preceded by: Thomas Cartwright
- Succeeded by: Hon. George Jerningham

Personal details
- Born: John Duncan Bligh; 11 October 1798 London, England
- Died: 8 May 1872 (aged 73) Sandgate, Kent
- Spouses: Elizabeth Mary Gisborne (m. 1835; died 1837) Anne Julia Brownlow (m. 1865; died 1872)
- Relations: William Brownlow (grandfather); Edward Bligh, 5th Earl of Darnley (brother)
- Children: Elizabeth Mary Pelham, Countess of Chichester
- Parent(s): John Bligh, 4th Earl of Darnley; Elizabeth Brownlow
- Education: Eton College
- Alma mater: Christ Church, Oxford; All Souls College, Oxford

The Hon. Sir John Duncan Bligh KCB, DL (11 October 1798 – 8 May 1872) was a British diplomat.

== Early life ==
Born in London, he was the second son of John Bligh, 4th Earl of Darnley and his wife, Elizabeth Brownlow, the third daughter of Anglo-Irish politician William Brownlow (himself a grandson of James Hamilton, 6th Earl of Abercorn). Through his mother, he was a first cousin of Charles Brownlow, 1st Baron Lurgan. His older brother was Edward Bligh, 5th Earl of Darnley and his paternal grandfather was John Bligh, 3rd Earl of Darnley.

Bligh was educated at Eton College and then matriculated at Christ Church, Oxford on 6 May 1818. He received a BA in 1821. He was later elected a fellow of All Souls College, Oxford, where he received a BCL in 1828 and a DCL in 1836.

=== Cricket ===
In 1822, Bligh played for the Marylebone Cricket Club (MCC) in a historically important match, batting twice and scoring 2 each time. Numerous members of his family were involved in cricket.

== Career ==
Bligh entered the diplomatic service and was sent as attaché to the embassy in Vienna in 1820. Three years later he was transferred to Paris and in 1826 a special mission led him to Russia, where he attended the coronation of Emperor Nicholas I. Afterwards he returned to France and became secretary of legation in Florence in 1829. In the following year Bligh was attached to The Hague as secretary of embassy. He served as envoy ad interim from July 1832 and came to Saint Petersburg in September, acting as ambassador.

Bligh was promoted to Envoy Extraordinary and Minister Plenipotentiary to the King of Sweden and Norway in 1835 and when King William IV of the United Kingdom died and thereby Hanover's personal union with Great Britain ended, he was admitted as new Envoy Extraordinary and Minister Plenipotentiary to the King of Hanover in 1838. After nine years, he took over also the British diplomatic representation in the Grand Duchy of Oldenburg and the Duchy of Brunswick. Bligh retired in 1856 and on this occasion was awarded a Knight Commander of the Order of the Bath.

In 1831, Bligh was appointed a captain in the Royal East Kent Yeomanry and in 1857, he was nominated a Deputy Lieutenant of the county of Kent.

== Personal life ==
On 19 December 1835, he married Elizabeth Mary Gisborne, the only daughter of Thomas Gisborne and Elizabeth Fyche (née Palmer) Gisborne, at the parish church of Allestree. Their only child was a daughter, named after her mother:

- Elizabeth Mary Bligh (1837–1911), who married Walter Pelham, 4th Earl of Chichester.

Elizabeth died two years later and Bligh remained a widower until 1865, when he remarried his cousin Anne Julia Brownlow, fourth daughter of Francis Brownlow at Ardbraccan Rectory on 28 November.

Bligh died at Sandgate, Kent in 1872 and was survived by his second wife for ten years.

== Notes ==
Diplomatic posts
Preceded by Thomas Cartwright	Envoy Extraordinary and Minister Plenipotentiary to the King of the Netherlands ad interim Jul – Sep 1832	Succeeded by Hon. George Jerningham
Preceded by Sir Stratford Canning	Ambassador Extraordinary and Plenipotentiary to the Emperor of Russia ad interim 1832–1835	Succeeded by The Earl of Durham
Preceded by Sir Edward Cromwell Disbrowe	Envoy Extraordinary and Minister Plenipotentiary to the King of Sweden and Norway; 1835–1838	Succeeded by Sir Thomas Cartwright
Vacant Title last held by The Earl of Clarendon	Envoy Extraordinary and Minister Plenipotentiary to the King of Hanover; 1838–1856	Succeeded by Sir John Fiennes Crampton
Vacant Title last held by Thomas Grenville	Minister Plenipotentiary to the Duke of Brunswick; 1847–1856	Succeeded by ?
New office	Minister Plenipotentiary to the Grand Duke of Oldenburg; 1847–1856	Succeeded by ?
