= List of diplomats of the United Kingdom to Prussia =

Below is an incomplete list of diplomats from the United Kingdom to Prussia, specifically Heads of Missions sent to the Elector of Brandenburg and to the Kingdom of Prussia from its formation of in 1701. From 1868, the ambassadors were attributed to the North German Confederation.

== Heads of Mission ==
=== Envoys Extraordinary and Ministers Plenipotentiary to the Elector of Brandenburg ===
- 1680: Sir Robert Southwell
- 1689: Robert Sutton, 2nd Baron Lexinton, Envoy Extraordinary
- 1690–1692: James Johnson
- 1692: George Stepney in charge
- 1692–1698: apparently no representation
- 1698–c.1700: George Stepney Envoy Extraordinary
- 1699–1703: Philip Plantamour in charge
  - 1700: James Cressett Envoy Extraordinary

=== Envoys Extraordinary and Ministers Plenipotentiary to the King of Prussia ===
  - 1701: Thomas Wentworth, 3rd Baron Raby Special Mission
- 1703–1711: Thomas Wentworth, 3rd Baron Raby Envoy Extraordinary until 1705, then Ambassador
  - 1704 and 1705: John Churchill, 1st Duke of Marlborough visited Berlin
  - 1708: Maj.-Gen. Francis Palmes Envoy Extraordinary
  - 1711: Charles Whitworth Special Mission
- 1712–1714: Brigadier William Britton
- 1715: Archibald Douglas, 2nd Earl of Forfar
- 1716: Alexander, Lord Polwarth, also to Denmark
- 1716–1717: Charles Whitworth
- 1719–1722: Charles Whitworth Minister Plenipotentiary
  - 1720: The Earl Cadogan Special mission
  - 1720: The Earl Stanhope Special mission
- 1722–1724: James Scott Minister
- 1724–1730: Charles Du Bourgay Envoy Extraordinary
  - 1726: Richard Sutton
  - 1730: Sir Charles Hotham Special Mission
- 1730–1741: Col. Guy Melchior Dickens Secretary until 1740, then Minister
  - 1741: Thomas Robinson Special Mission
- 1741–1744: John Carmichael, 3rd Earl of Hyndford Envoy Extraordinary and Plenipotentiary
- 1744–1747: Frederick Lorentz Secretary, in charge
- 1746: Hon. Thomas Villiers Minister Plenipotentiary
- 1747–1749: Henry Legge
- 1750–1751: Charles Hanbury Williams

1751–1756: Apparently no representation

- 1756–1771: Andrew Mitchell Minister 1756–1760; Minister Plenipotentiary 1760–1764; Envoy Extraordinary and Plenipotentiary 1766–1771
- 1758: Joseph Yorke Minister Plenipotentiary
- 1771–1772: Robert Gunning
- 1772–1776: James Harris
- 1777–1782: Hugh Elliot
- 1782: George Cholmondeley, 4th Earl of Cholmondeley
- 1782–1784: Sir John Stepney, Bt
- 1785–1787: John Dalrymple, Viscount Dalrymple
- 1788–1791: Joseph Ewart Envoy Extraordinary
- 1791–1793: Sir Morton Eden
- 1793–1794: James Harris, 1st Baron Malmesbury
- 1794–1795: Arthur Paget envoy extraordinary – special mission.
- 1795: Lord Henry Spencer
- 1795–1799: Thomas Bruce, 7th Earl of Elgin
  - 1796: George Hammond Extraordinary Mission
  - 1798: Granville Leveson-Gower Special Mission
  - 1798: Rt. Hon. Thomas Grenville Special Mission
- 1800–1802: John Proby, 1st Earl of Carysfort
- 1802–1806: Francis Jackson
  - 1805–1806: Dudley Ryder, Baron Harrowby Special Mission
  - 1806: Charles Stanhope, 3rd Earl of Harrington Special Mission
  - 1806: George Howard, Viscount Morpeth Plenipotentiary
  - 1806: Lieut-Gen. Baron Hutchinson Plenipotentiary
- 1806–1807: No representation due to the occupation of Hanover
- 1807: Benjamin Garlike Minister ad interim
- 1807–1808: John Frere
- 1808–1813: No representation due to the Treaties of Tilsit
- 1813–1814: Hon. Sir Charles Stewart
- 1815–1823: George Rose
- 1823–1827: Richard Meade, 3rd Earl of Clanwilliam
- 1827–1830: Sir Brook Taylor
- 1830–1832: George Chad
  - 1832: Baron Durham Special Mission
- 1832–1834: Gilbert Elliot-Murray-Kynynmound, 2nd Earl of Minto
- 1834–1835: Sir George Shee, Bt
- 1835–1841: Lord George Russell
- 1841–1851: John Fane, 11th Earl of Westmorland
- 1851–1860: John Bloomfield, 2nd Baron Bloomfield
- 1860–1862: Lord Augustus Loftus

=== Ambassadors Extraordinary and Plenipotentiary ===
- 1862–1864: Sir Andrew Buchanan
- 1864–1866: Francis Napier, 10th Lord Napier
- 1866–1868: Lord Augustus Loftus

Loftus becomes ambassador to Prussia and to the new North German Confederation

== See also ==
- List of diplomats of the United Kingdom to Germany for diplomatic representation after 1868
