= Fairfax Leighton Cartwright =

British writer and diplomat (1857–1928)

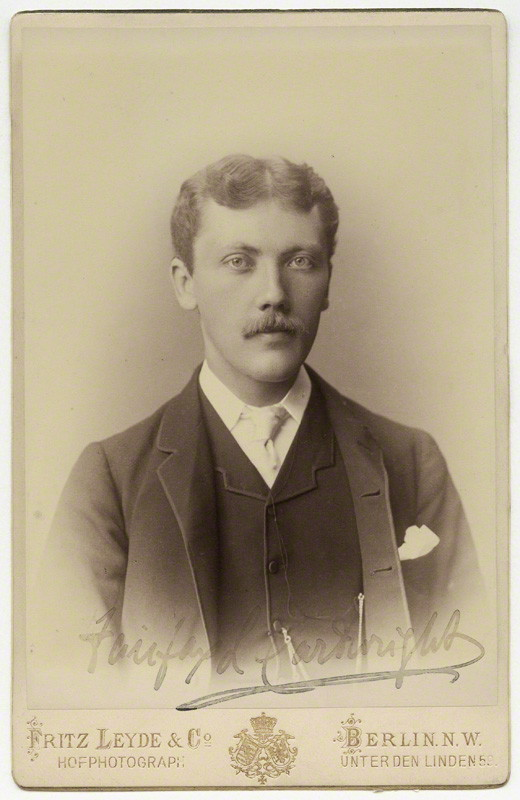
Cartwright, c. 1885

Sir Fairfax Leighton Cartwright GCMG GCVO PC (20 July 1857 – 9 January 1928) was a British writer and diplomat who became ambassador to the Austro-Hungarian empire before World War I.

== Biography ==
Born 20 July 1857, Cartwright was the second son of William Cornwallis Cartwright MP for Oxfordshire and his wife Clementine Gaul. He became a diplomat and in the 1880s wrote verse tragedies and other works. From 1899 to 1902, he was secretary to the legation in Mexico and from August 1902 to 1905 secretary to the legation in Lisbon. He was councillor to the Madrid Embassy from 1905 to 1906. From 1906 to 1908, he occupied the combined posts of British Minister to Bavaria and Württemberg.

In 1908, he was made Privy Councillor and he reached the pinnacle of his career as British Ambassador to Austria-Hungary where he remained until 1913. Cartwright tried with the help of the French ambassador, Philippe Crozier, to weaken Austria's dependence on Germany. In 1911, Austria-Hungary wanted to modernise their armed forces, and asked the French to supply a huge loan to help do this. The French government opposed it because Austria-Hungary was not part of the Triple Entente. Fairfax and Crozier realised that Austria-Hungary did not wish to be attached absolutely to their alliance with Germany, and tried to change the mind of the French government to support Austria-Hungary. Had they succeeded, it might have averted the First World War. In 1913, Fairfax wrote, "Some day Serbia will set Europe by the ears and bring about a universal war on the continent." He believed that Archduke Franz Ferdinand was a certifiable maniac, and was not fit to inherit the empire, and told his government so.

Cartwright married Donna Maria dei Marchesi Chigi-Zondadari, the daughter of an Italian senator, on 16 October 1898. They turned the British embassy in Vienna from an undistinguished one into one of the most fashionable. In 1911, an international incident nearly took place involving Lady Cartwright. While she was dancing with the Austrian Foreign Minister, the Russian ambassador cut in and a vicious feud started between the two men.

== Works ==
- Lorello. A play in five acts. In verse 1884
- Bianca Capello. A tragedy. In verse 1886
- The Baglioni. A tragedy. In verse 1888
- Olga Zanelli. A tale of an imperial city 1890. This is a three-volume fictional work which recounted seedy adulteries among figures in high society whose identities were faintly disguised. After all his friends in diplomatic circles begged him to withdraw the book immediately, he managed to recover nearly all the 1500 copies printed.
- The Mystic Rose from the Garden of the King. A Fragment of the Vision of Sheikh Haji Ibrahim of Kerbela 1898

Diplomatic posts
Preceded by Reginald Thomas Tower	British Minister to Bavaria and Württemberg; 1906–1909	Succeeded by Ralph Paget
Preceded by Edward Goschen	British Ambassador to Austria-Hungary; 1908-1913	Succeeded by Maurice de Bunsen
