= James Haldane (diplomat) =

British soldier and diplomat

James Haldane (1692 – 17 September 1742) was an 18th-century British soldier and diplomat.

He was Lieutenant-colonel of the Royal Horse Guards from 1715 to 1734.

He was Minister Resident to Russia in 1715 to 1716. He later made diplomatic visits to Hesse-Cassel and the Palatinate in 1719 to 1720. He was then Commissioner of Police in Scotland in 1721.

He was appointed Lieutenant-colonel of Guise's regiment in 1741, but died at sea off Jamaica in 1742.

He was grandfather of the Scottish evangelist James Alexander Haldane, who was in turn grandfather of Richard Haldane, 1st Viscount Haldane.
