= William Canning =

Canon of Windsor (1778–1860)

William Canning (1778 – 24 February 1860) was a Canon of Windsor from 1828 to 1860.

== Biography ==
William Canning was the third son of Stratford Canning (1744–1787) and Mehitabel Patrick. He was the brother of Stratford Canning, 1st Viscount Stratford de Redcliffe.

He was educated at Eton College and then Sidney Sussex College, Cambridge, where he graduated BA in 1801, MA in 1804.

He was rector of East and West Hesterton, Yorkshire (1817–1847).

He was appointed to the seventh stall in St George's Chapel, Windsor Castle, in 1828, and held the stall until 1860. His funeral was delayed since the appearances usually following death have not appeared.
