= List of diplomats of the United Kingdom to Saxony =

Below is an incomplete list of diplomats from the United Kingdom to Saxony, specifically Heads of Missions.

== Heads of Missions ==
=== Envoys Extraordinary and Ministers Plenipotentiary ===
==== Elector of Saxony ====
- 1693: Sir William Dutton Colt Two Special Missions
- 1693–1698: George Stepney Three Special Missions: 1693–1694 as Commissary and Deputy; 1695 as Minister; 1698 as Envoy Extraordinary

==== Elector of Saxony and King of Poland ====
1698 to 1763: The Elector of Saxony was usually also King of Poland: no separate mission to Saxony: see List of Ambassadors from the United Kingdom to Poland

==== Elector of Saxony ====
- 1764–1768: Philip Stanhope
- 1769–1771: Robert Murray Keith (the younger)
- 1771–1775: John Osborne
- 1775–1783: Sir John Stepney, Bt
  - 1782: Viscount Dalrymple (did not go)
- 1783–1791: Morton Eden
- 1791–1803: Hugh Elliot
- 1803–1806: Henry Williams-Wynn

1806–1816: No diplomatic relations

==== Kingdom of Saxony ====
- 1806–1816: Henry Williams-Wynn
- 1816–1824: John Morier
- 1824–1828: George Chad
- 1828–1832: Edward Ward
- 1832–1858: Hon. Francis Forbes
- 1858–1859: Augustus Paget
- 1859–1866: Hon. Charles Murray
- 1866–1867: John Lumley
- 1867–1874: Joseph Hume Burnley
- 1873–1897: George Strachey
- 1897–1901: Sir Alexander Condie Stephen
- 1901–1907: Hugh Gough, 3rd Viscount Gough
- 1907–1909: Mansfeldt Findlay
- 1909–1914: Arthur Grant Duff
