= Anne Disbrowe =

British socialite (1795–1855)

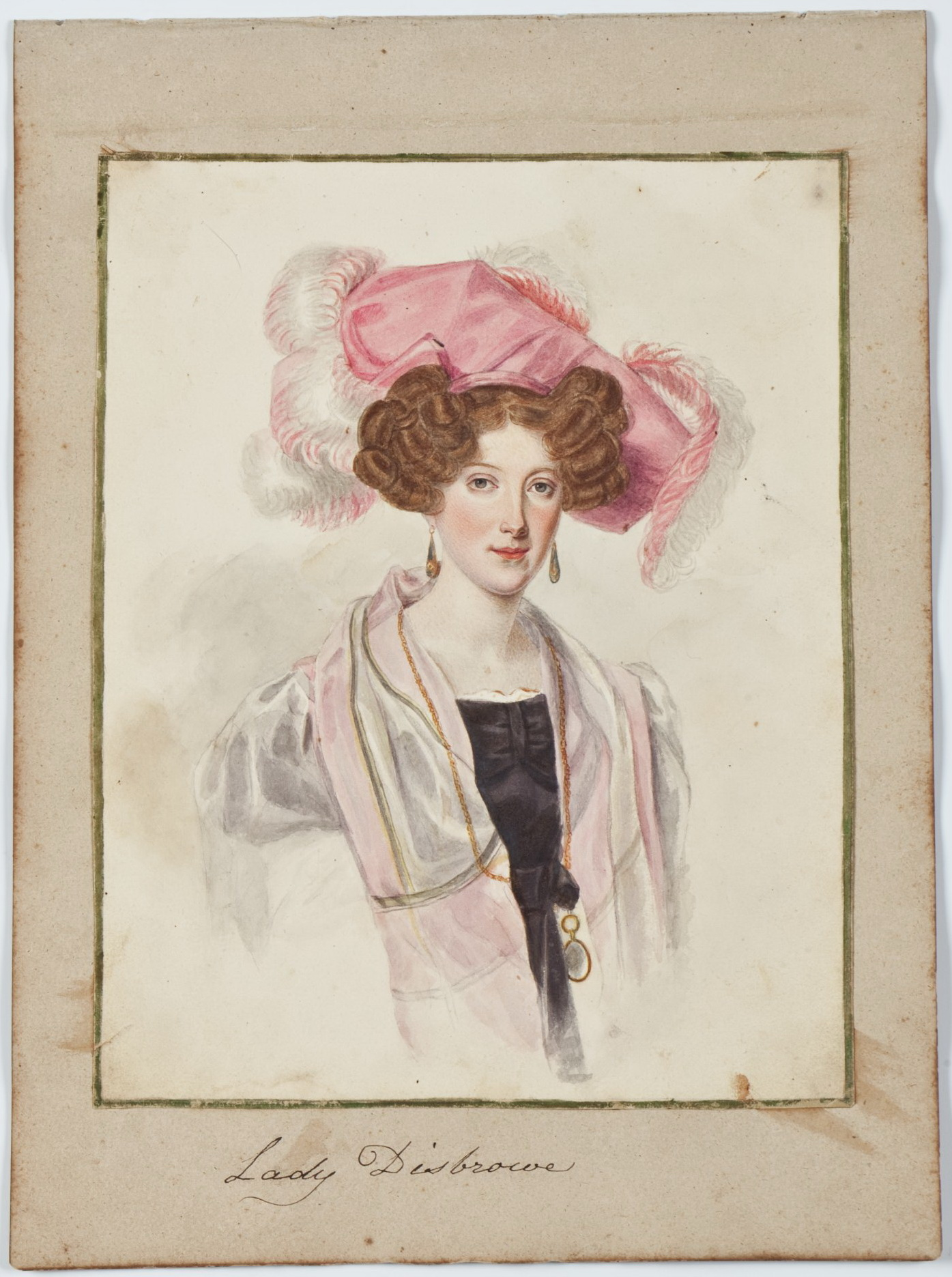
- A watercolour of Disbrowe, c. 1825–28
- Born: Charlotte Anne Albinia Kennedy; 1795; New Jersey, United States
- Died: 18 October 1855 (aged 59–60)
- Spouse: Sir Edward Cromwell Disbrowe (m. 1821)
- Children: Charlotte Disbrowe; Jane Harriet Wise
- Parent(s): Hon. Robert Kennedy; Jane Macomb

Charlotte Anne Albinia Disbrowe (née Kennedy; 1795 – 18 October 1855) was a British society hostess who lived abroad as the wife of Edward Cromwell Disbrowe, a diplomat. Her letters, written while residing in the Russian Empire, were later published and provide historians with valuable first-hand accounts of life at the Imperial Russian court in the early 19th century.

== Early life and family ==
Anne Kennedy was the eldest child of the Robert Kennedy, a younger son of Archibald Kennedy, 11th Earl of Cassilis. Her mother was Jane Macomb, the daughter of a successful American merchant. The family lived for several years in New Jersey, where Anne was born, before moving their residence to England. On 24 October 1821, she married Edward Cromwell Disbrowe, a British diplomat. The couple met in Switzerland. Their first child was born the year after their marriage in Bern. In late 1822, they returned to England, where Edward became a Member of Parliament (MP) for Windsor (1823–26). The growing family lived in Walton Hall, Derbyshire. They eventually had four surviving children: daughters Charlotte and Jane (who later married Henry Christopher Wise), and sons Edward and William.

== Life as a diplomatic wife ==
In April 1825, Edward Disbrowe travelled to Saint Petersburg to serve as Minister Plenipotentiary at the court of Tsar Alexander I. Anne followed in June, accompanied by her father. Initially told this would be a short-lived posting, they decided to leave their two young daughters behind in England out of fear the sea journey would be too dangerous. The girls stayed with Anne's parents at Walton Hall. Events at court quickly extended the couple's stay; Tsar Alexander died, which precipitated the Decembrist revolt and Nicholas I's eventual succession. The Disbrowes were then posted to Moscow in 1826, as part of a large English delegation for the new tsar's coronation. As there was no permanent ambassador to Russia in place, Anne was the highest ranking English lady present and had many social duties to perform, further delaying their return home. Anne's letters reveal her anguish at being separated from her children. She and her husband considered sending for them, but worried about the serious risks associated with travel and Russia's climate. Anne would not see them again until her return to England in March 1828, a gap of three years.

After Russia, Disbrowe held appointments in Württemberg and Stockholm, and in 1831 he was knighted into the Royal Guelphic Order. Beginning in January 1836, he and his family moved to The Hague where he served as an envoy. There he fell ill in September 1851, and died on 29 October. His grieving family then returned to England. In his will, he left his widow and two daughters an annuity of £500. The family properties were later divided among both daughters; Walton Hall was inherited by Charlotte, and Jane acquired an estate in Northamptonshire. Their son Edward died in 1854, and according to his sister Charlotte, Anne's "health never recovered from that terrible loss". Anne died in October of the following year.

== Legacy ==
Charlotte later published much of her mother's correspondence; these letters have provided historians with valuable first-hand accounts of life at the Russian court in the early 19th century. She edited a collection of letters and had them printed by the Ladies' Printing Press for private publication in 1878, under the name Original Letters from Russia 1825–1828. Some of these letters were later adapted into another book, Old Days in Diplomacy: Recollections of a Closed Century, published in 1903 by Jarrold & Sons.
