= Peter Maxey =

British diplomat

- Born: 26 December 1930
- Died: 25 October 2014
- Occupation: British diplomat

Peter Malcolm Maxey CMG (26 December 1930 - 25 October 2014) was a British diplomat.

== Biography ==
Born on 26 December 1930, Peter Maxey was educated at Bedford School and at Corpus Christi College, Cambridge. He joined the British Diplomatic Service in 1953 and, following diplomatic postings in Moscow, Helsinki, Colombo and at the United Nations in Geneva, he was appointed Under Secretary at the Cabinet Office in London between 1978 and 1981. He served as British Ambassador to the German Democratic Republic between 1981 and 1984, and as British Ambassador to the United Nations between 1984 and 1986.

Maxey was appointed a Companion of the Order of St Michael and St George (CMG) in the 1982 Birthday Honours.
