= John Carmichael, 3rd Earl of Hyndford =

British diplomat and courtier

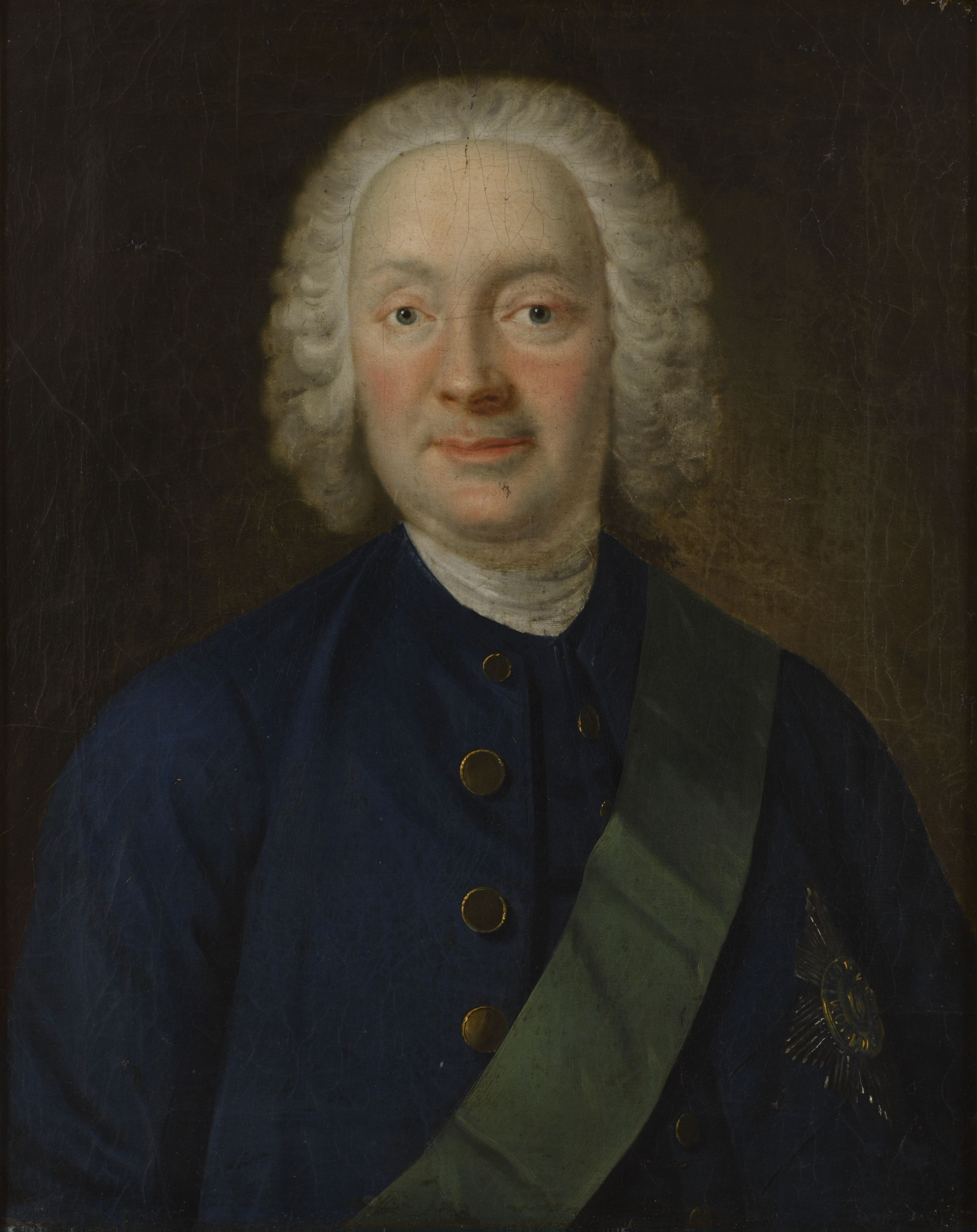
Portrait of Hyndford

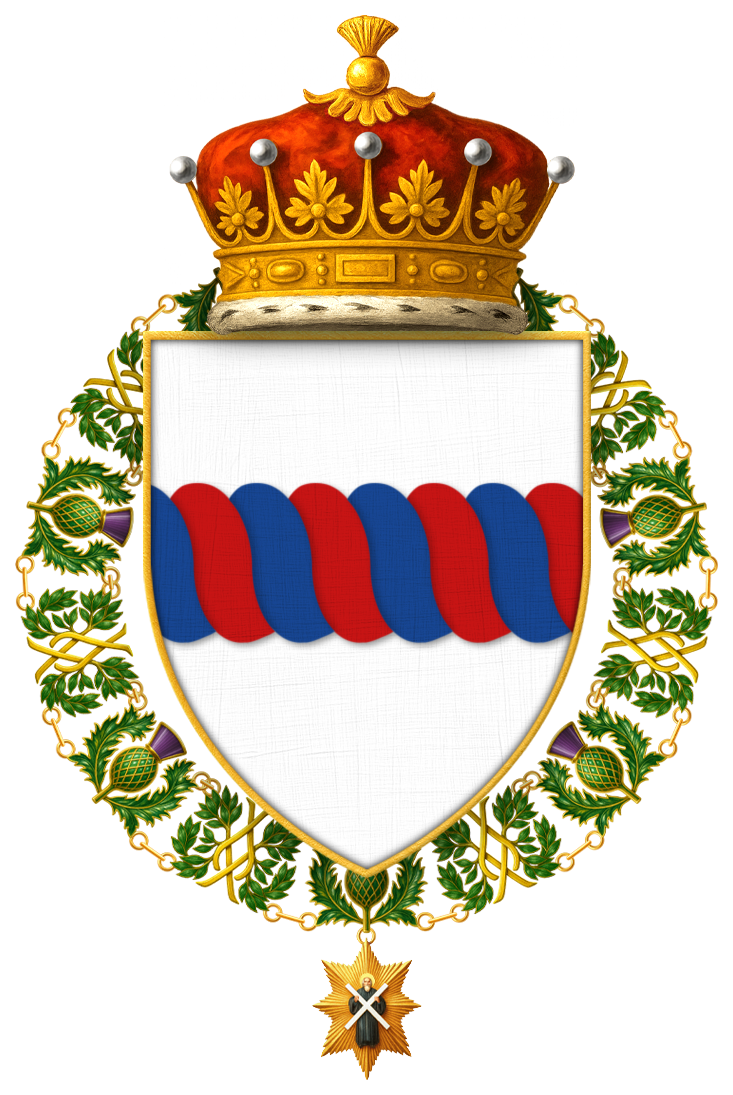
Shield of arms of John Carmichael, 3rd Earl of Hyndford, KT, PC

John Carmichael, 3rd Earl of Hyndford KT PC (15 March 1701 – 19 July 1767), styled Lord Carmichael between 1710 and 1737, was a British diplomat and courtier.

== Life ==
He was son of James Carmichael, 2nd Earl of Hyndford and succeeded to the earldom in 1737. He was a Scottish representative peer from 1739 and sheriff of Lanark from 1739, Lord High Commissioner to the General Assembly of the Church of Scotland in 1739 and 1740. He was appointed a Knight of the Thistle in 1742 and a Privy Counsellor in 1750. He was Vice Admiral of Scotland from 1764 to 1767.

He was envoy to Prussia from 1741 to 1742, to Russia from 1744 to 1749 and to Vienna from 1752 to 1764.

He was succeeded by John Carmichael, the son of his uncle, William Carmichael of Skirling.

Diplomatic posts
Unknown	Envoys Extraordinary to Prussia; 1741–1742	Unknown
Preceded by Melchior Guy-Dickens	Ambassador to Russia; 1744–1750	Succeeded by Charles Hanbury Williams
Preceded by Robert Keith	Ambassador to Austria; 1756–1764	Succeeded by The Viscount Stormont
Political offices
Preceded by New government	Lord of the Bedchamber; 1760–1761	Succeeded by The Earl of Pembroke
Military offices
Preceded by James Ogilvy	Vice Admiral of Scotland; 1764–1767	Succeeded by William Douglas
Peerage of Scotland
Preceded by James Carmichael	Earl of Hyndford; 1737–1767	Succeeded by John Carmichael
