= List of diplomats of the United Kingdom to Württemberg =

Below is an incomplete list of diplomats from the United Kingdom to Württemberg, specifically Heads of Missions sent after the creation of the Kingdom of Württemberg in 1806.

== Heads of Missions ==
=== Envoys Extraordinary to the Dukes of Württemberg ===
There were no regular diplomatic relations before 1804, but envoys to various German states occasionally visited Stuttgart.

- 1798: Charles Arbuthnot
- 1804: John Spencer Smith

No diplomatic relations 1804–1814 due to Napoleonic War

=== Envoys Extraordinary and Ministers Plenipotentiary ===
- 1814–1820: Brook Taylor
- 1820–1823: Alexander Cockburn
- 1823–1825: Henry Williams-Wynn
- 1825–1828: David Erskine, 2nd Baron Erskine
- 1828–1833: Edward Disbrowe
- 1833–1835: Lord William Russell
- 1835–1844: Sir George Shee, Bt
- 1844–1852: Sir Alexander Malet, Bt
- 1852–1854: Arthur Magenis
- 1854–1859: Hon. George Jerningham
- 1859–1871: George Gordon

Württemberg joined the German Empire in 1871 and the Head of Mission was relegated to Chargé d'affaires

=== Chargés d'affaires ===
- 1871–1872: Robert Morier
- 1872–?: George Petre

=== Ministers Resident ===
- 1881–1883: Gerard Gould
- 1883–1900?: Sir Henry Barron, Bt

In 1903, thepost was merged with that of Bavaria

- 1903–1906: Reginald Tower
- 1906–1908: Fairfax Cartwright
- 1909–1910: Ralph Paget
- 1910–1914: Sir Vincent Corbett
