= Edward Cromwell Disbrowe =

British politician

Sir Edward Cromwell Disbrowe KH
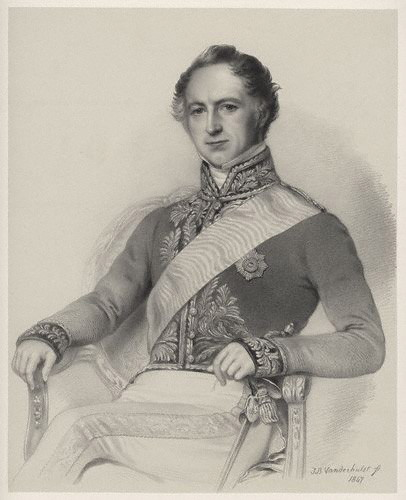

Envoy Extraordinary and Minister Plenipotentiary to the King of the Netherlands
- In office 1836–1851
- Preceded by: George Jerningham (Chargé d'affaires)
- Succeeded by: Ralph Abercromby

Envoy Extraordinary and Minister Plenipotentiary to the King of Sweden and Norway
- In office 1833–1835
- Preceded by: Lord Howard de Walden
- Succeeded by: John Duncan Bligh

Envoy Extraordinary and Minister Plenipotentiary to the King of Württemberg
- In office 1828–1833
- Preceded by: The Lord Erskine
- Succeeded by: Lord George Russell

Acting Minister Plenipotentiary at the Court of St. Petersburg
- In office 1825–1828
- Preceded by: Edward Michael Ward
- Succeeded by: William Temple

Member of Parliament for Windsor
- In office 1823–1826 Serving with John Ramsbottom
- Preceded by: Herbert Taylor; John Ramsbottom
- Succeeded by: Edward Smith-Stanley; John Ramsbottom

Personal details
- Born: 1790 Walton Hall, Walton-on-Trent, South Derbyshire, England
- Died: 29 October 1851 (aged 60–61) The Hague, The Netherlands
- Spouse: Anne Kennedy (m. 1821)
- Parents: Edward Disbrowe (father); Lady Charlotte Hobart (mother)
- Education: Eton College
- Occupation: Diplomat, politician, ambassador

Sir Edward Cromwell Disbrowe, KH (1790–1851) was a British politician and diplomat.

== Life and career ==
Disbrowe was born at Walton Hall, Walton-on-Trent, South Derbyshire, the son of Colonel Edward Disbrowe, and his wife Lady Charlotte Hobart, fourth daughter of George Hobart, 3rd Earl of Buckinghamshire. He was a lineal descendant of John Desborough (or Disbrowe), a senior commander in the Parliamentary Army who was brother-in-law to Oliver Cromwell. His father was Vice-Chamberlain to Queen Charlotte, wife of King George III.

Disbrowe was Member of Parliament (MP) for Windsor (1823–26), and later served in the British diplomatic corps in positions in Switzerland, Russia, Sweden and other postings. He was British Ambassador to the Netherlands from 1836 to 1851, where he died at the Hague. His body was returned to England on the ship HMS Lightning. He also served as a Deputy Lieutenant of the county of Derbyshire.

== Family ==
Disbrowe was married to Anne Kennedy, daughter of the Hon. Robert Kennedy, son of Archibald Kennedy, 11th Earl of Cassilis.

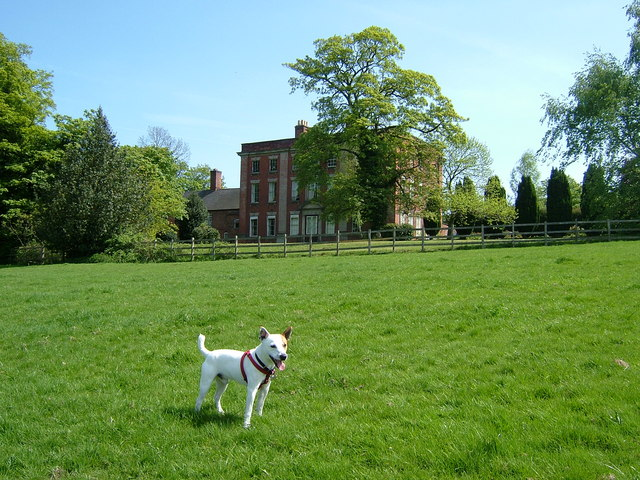
Disbrowe's birthplace - Walton Hall, Walton-on-Trent

Disbrowe's eldest daughter Charlotte, who lived at the family home in Derbyshire, became a writer of note, publishing two volumes recounting her father's diplomatic service, with particular attention to his time in Russia. Disbrowe's younger daughter Jane Harriet married Henry Christopher Wise of Woodcote House, Leek Wootton, Warwickshire, Member of Parliament. Wise was the great-great-grandson of Henry Wise, gardener to Queen Anne, who laid out Kensington Gardens.

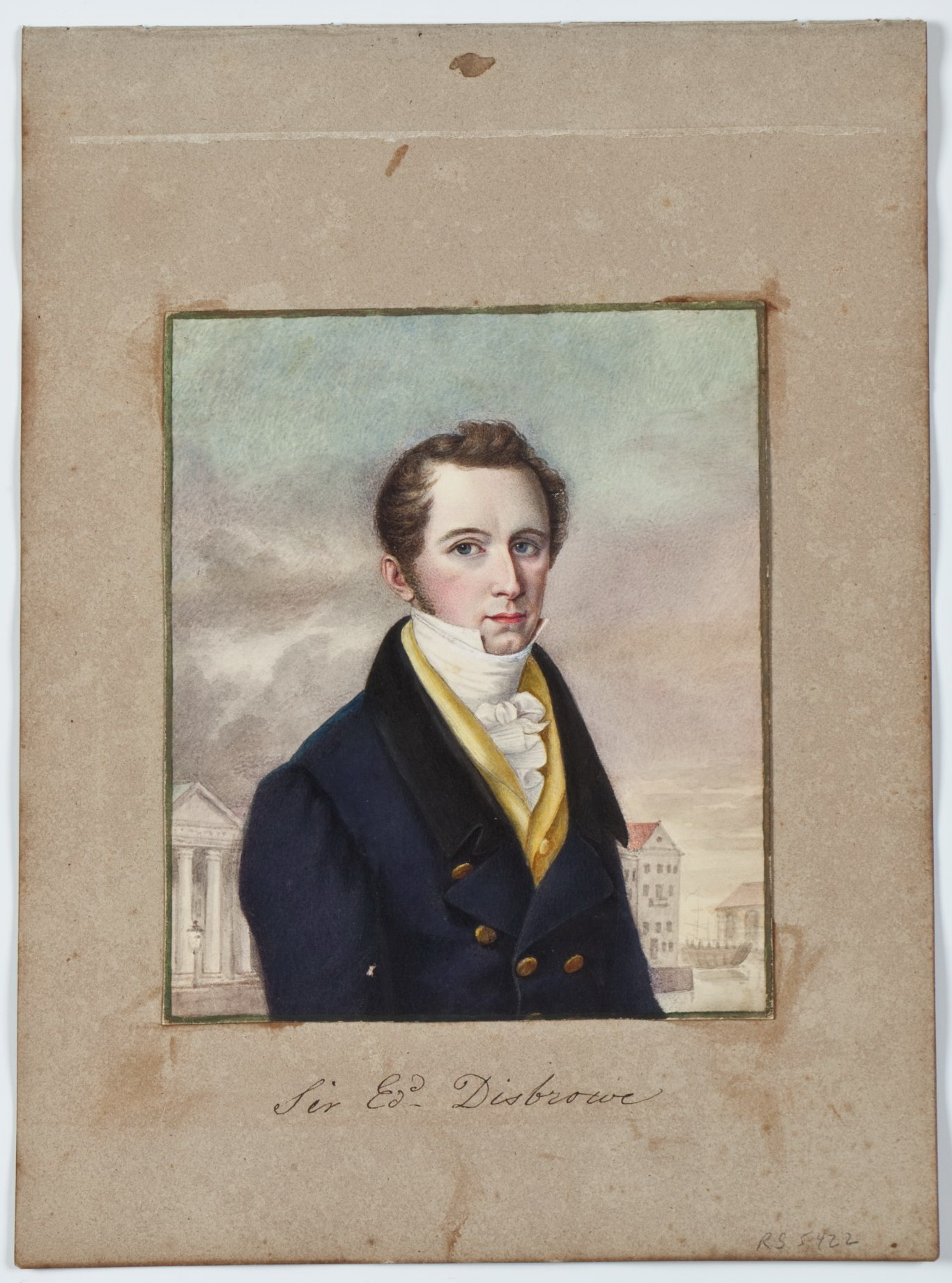
1820s

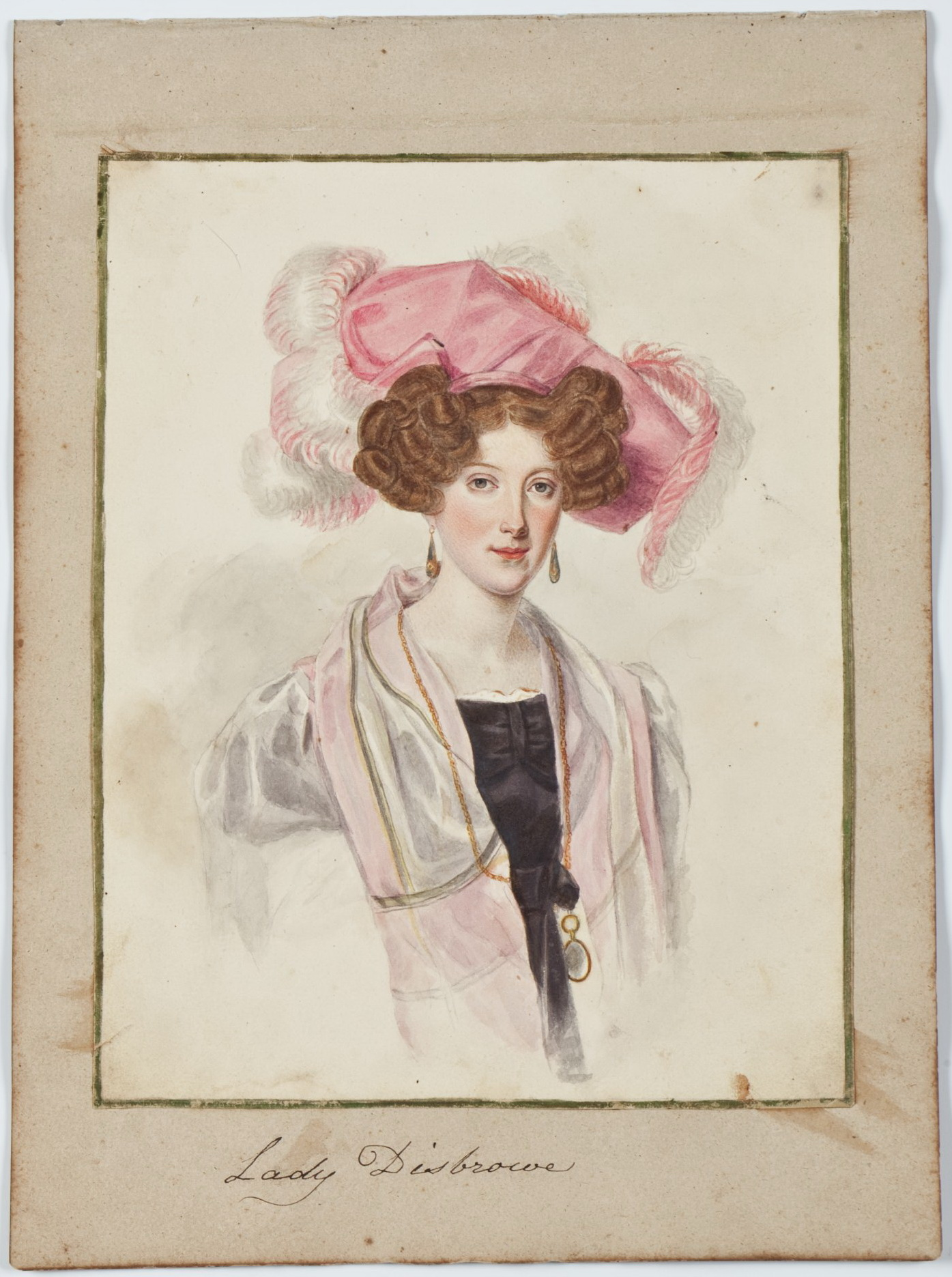
Wife

Parliament of the United Kingdom
Preceded by Herbert Taylor; John Ramsbottom	Member of Parliament for Windsor; 1823 – 1826; With: John Ramsbottom	Succeeded by Hussey Vivian; John Ramsbottom
Diplomatic posts
Preceded by Edward Michael Ward	Minister Plenipotentiary to the Emperor of Russia ad interim 1825–1828	Succeeded by Hon. William Temple
Preceded by The Lord Erskine	British Minister to Württemberg; 1828 – 1833	Succeeded by Lord William Russell
