= Robert Gordon (diplomat) =

British diplomat

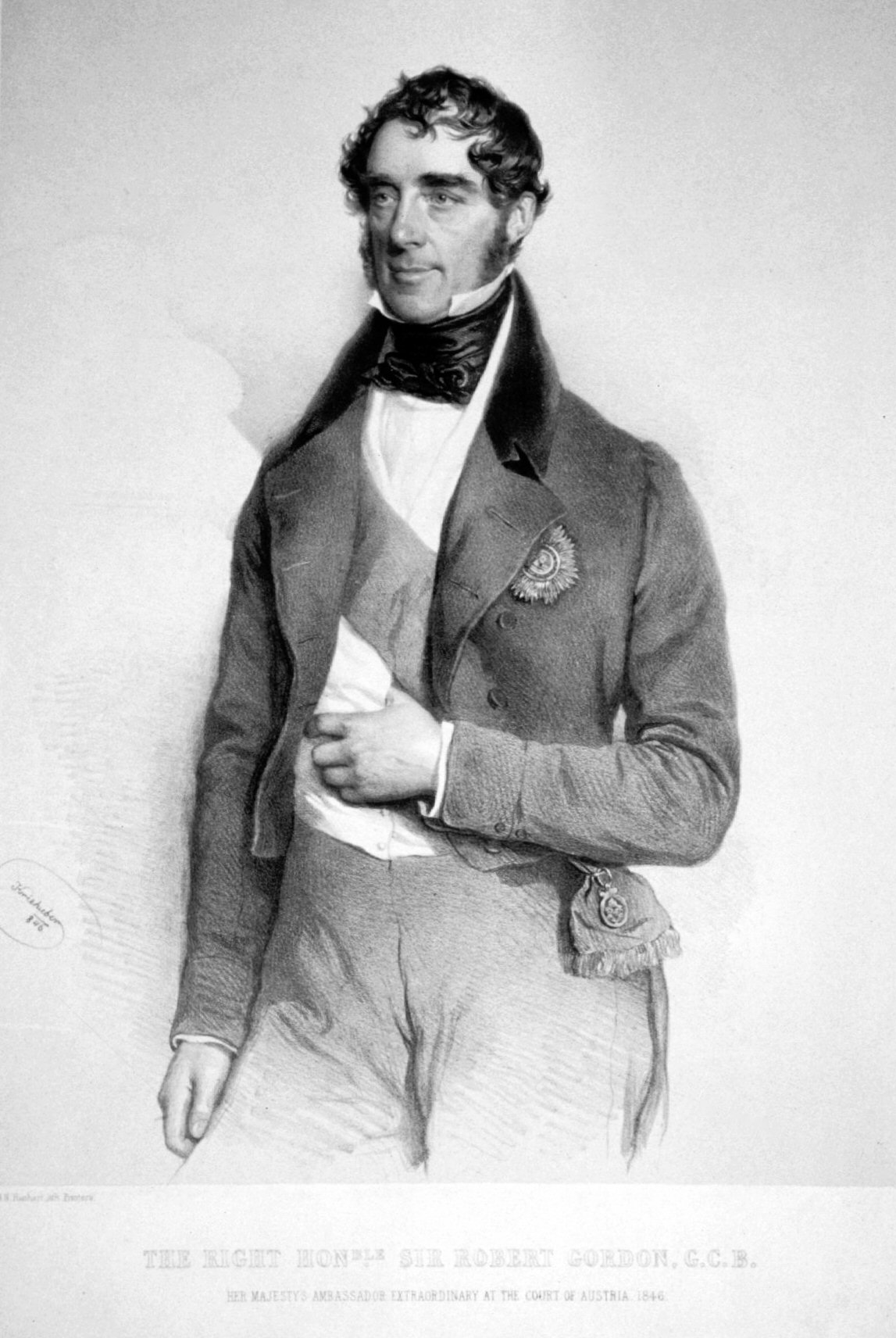
Sir Robert Gordon Lithograph by Josef Kriehuber, 1846

Sir Robert Gordon GCB GCH PC (1791 – 8 October 1847) was a British diplomat.

Gordon was a younger son of George Gordon, Lord Haddo (himself the eldest son of the 3rd Earl of Aberdeen) and a brother of the 4th Earl of Aberdeen. He was educated at St John's College, Cambridge. From 1826 to 1828, he was Envoy Extraordinary to Brazil (during which time he negotiated the British-Brazilian Treaty of 1826), to the Ottoman Empire from 1828 to 1831 and to Austria from 1841 to 1847. He took leave twice during his stay in Vienna, with John Fiennes-Twisleton-Crampton (September to October 1842) and Arthur Magenis (31 July 1845 to April 1846) taking charge in his place.

In 1830, he acquired a long-term lease of Balmoral Castle. He died in 1847 as the result of choking on a fish bone. Prince Albert bought the estate from his trustees a year later as a gift for his wife, Queen Victoria.

Diplomatic posts
Preceded by Sir Frederick Lamb	British Ambassador to the Austrian Empire; 1841–1846	Succeeded by The Viscount Ponsonby
