= Thomas Cartwright (diplomat) =

British diplomat

Sir Thomas Cartwright (1795 – 15 April 1850) was a British diplomat who served in Germany, Belgium and Sweden.

Cartwright was the son of William Ralph Cartwright, M.P. for Northamptonshire and his wife Hon. Emma Mary Hawarden. He was educated at Christ Church, Oxford. From 1821 to 1829 he was secretary of legation in Munich and was then on a special mission in Belgium. From 1830 to 1838 he was minister plenipotentiary to the German Confederation in Frankfurt. He was knighted as a Knight Grand Cross, Hanoverian Order in 1834. From 1838 to 1850 he was envoy extraordinary and minister plenipotentiary in Stockholm, where he was among a group of British residents who helped to set up regular Anglican church services in the city. He died there in 1850.

Cartwright married, in 1825, Graefin Maria Elisabeth Augusta von Sandizell, the daughter of a Bavarian nobleman. Lady Cartwright survived her husband by more than 50 years, and died at her residence in Leamington, on 13 April 1902, aged 97. Her watercolours of Aynhoe House and village in the 1840s, with some extracts from her diaries, have been published. Their son William Cornwallis Cartwright was MP for Oxfordshire.

Diplomatic posts
Preceded by George William Chad	Minister Plenipotentiary to the German Confederation; 1829 – 1838	Succeeded by Hon. Henry Fox
