= Charles Whitworth, 1st Baron Whitworth =

British diplomat (1675–1725)

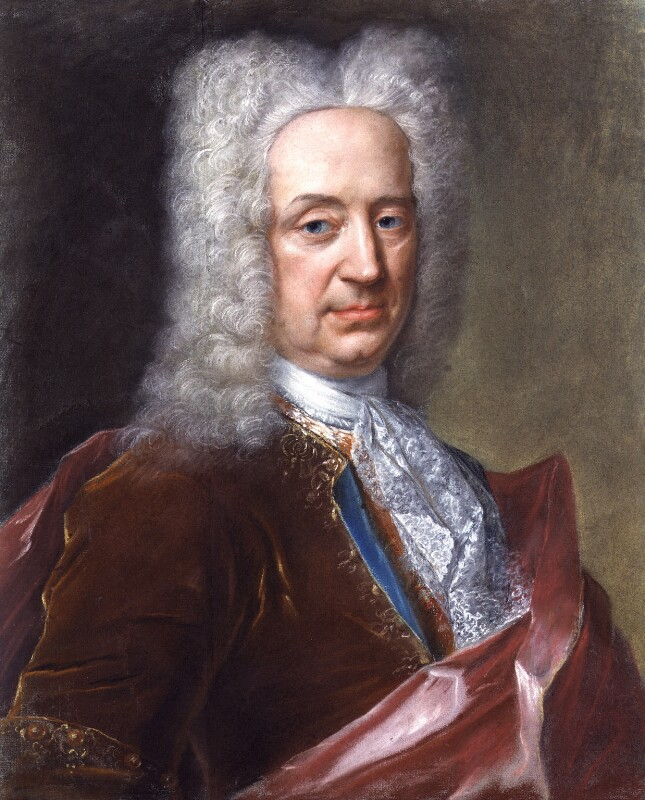
Portrait by Guillaume Birochon, c. 1724

Charles Whitworth, 1st Baron Whitworth (14 October 1675 – 23 October 1725) was a British politician and diplomat who served as the British ambassador to Russia from 1707 to 1712.

== Early life ==
Whitworth was possibly born at Blore Pipe, near Eccleshall, Staffordshire. He entered Westminster School as a Queen's Scholar in 1690, and then entered Trinity College, Cambridge in 1694. He graduated with a BA in 1699 and became a Fellow the next year.

== Diplomatic career ==
Whitworth entered diplomatic service in 1700 as secretary to George Stepney, envoy at Berlin. In November 1701 he was appointed as British aide to Cardinal Lamberg, the Holy Roman Emperor's chief commissary at the Congress of Regensburg. He also deputised at Vienna for Stepney, when he was absent from the embassy there.

In 1704, Whitworth was appointed as Ambassador Extraordinary to Russia. His initial role was to regularise the position of the Russia Company which had mismanaged the tobacco monopoly granted it in 1698. He succeeded in this between 1707 and 1711, but not in the wider object of obtaining a commercial treaty. He also had to handle Russian sensibilities over the arrest for debt in 1708 of the emperor's envoy Andrey Matveyev, sent to London to seek British mediation in the Great Northern War. He remained accredited in Russia until 1712, but was increasingly absent on diplomatic business elsewhere in eastern Europe. He was charged by Queen Anne to discover and evaluate high-level Russian strategies. He closely observed public events and noted the changing the power status of key leaders. He cultivated influential and knowledgeable persons at the royal court, and befriended foreigners in Russia's service, and in turn they provided insights into high-level Russian planning and personalities, which he summarized and sent in code to London. He wrote an Account of Russia as it was in the Year 1710, which (though not published until 1758) influenced British views of Russia for much of the century.

In December 1713, he was appointed as one of the commissaries to treat with the French concerning the Treaty of Navigation and Commerce concluded at Utrecht. In April 1714 he was sent to Augsburg to observe negotiations between the emperor and France, taking place at Baden that summer. This was followed by his appointment as British minister to the Eternal Imperial Diet at Regensburg.

In August 1716, when he was appointed envoy at Berlin, but was seconded to The Hague, to try to persuade the Netherlands to conform to the British embargo on Sweden.

== Death ==
Whitworth returned to Berlin in 1719, where the following year, he married the comtesse de Vaulgremont (died 1734), the daughter of a government official in French-speaking Flanders. He was raised to the Irish peerage as Baron Whitworth, of Galway, in 1721. In 1722, he became Member of Parliament for Newport, Isle of Wight. He died childless in 1725, upon which his barony became extinct. Whitworth was buried at Westminster Abbey, his grave is in the South choir aisle.

Parliament of Great Britain
Preceded by William Stephens; Thomas Stanwix	Member of Parliament for Newport, Isle of Wight; 1722–1725; With: The Earl of March 1722; Charles Cadogan 1722–1725	Succeeded by Charles Cadogan; George Huxley
Peerage of Ireland
New creation	Baron Whitworth; 1721–1725	Extinct
