= List of ambassadors of the United Kingdom to Russia =

UK Ambassador to the Russian Federation Британский Посол в России
- Royal arms of His Majesty's Government

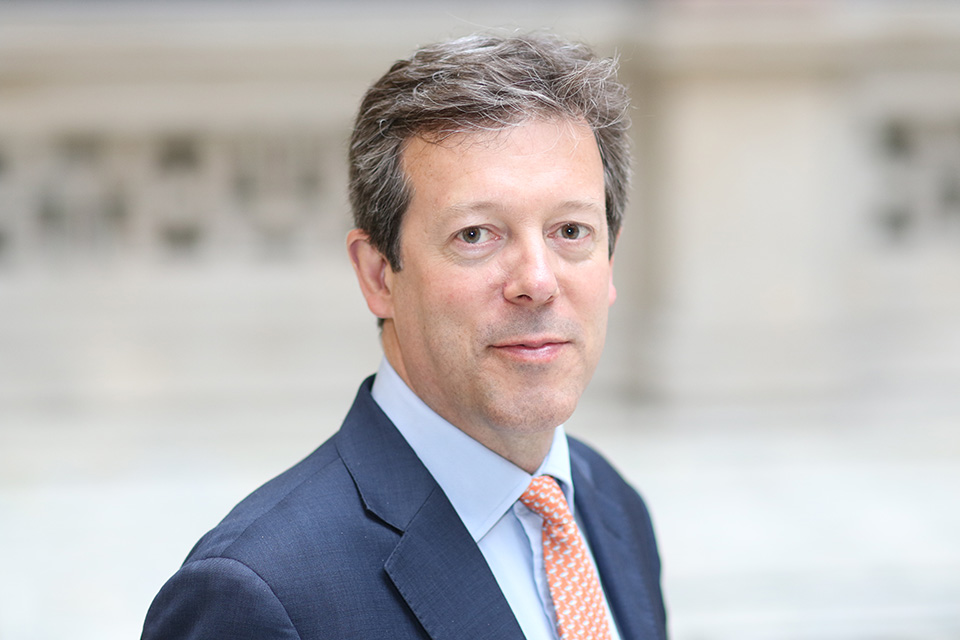
- Incumbent; Nigel Casey since 2023
- Style: His Excellency
- Reports to: Secretary of State for Foreign, Commonwealth and Development Affairs
- Residence: Moscow
- Appointer: Charles III
- Inaugural holder: The Lord St Helens; First Ambassador Extraordinary and Plenipotentiary of the United Kingdom to Russia The Lord Bloomfield; First Envoy Extraordinary and Minister Plenipotentiary to Russia Sir John Crampton, Bt; First Ambassador to Russia
- Formation: 1801; Ambassadors Extraordinary and Plenipotentiary 1844; Envoys Extraordinary and Ministers Plenipotentiary 1860; Ambassadors
- Website: British Embassy - Moscow

The ambassador of the United Kingdom to Russia (Russian: Британский Посол в России) is the United Kingdom's foremost diplomatic representative in the Russian Federation and head of the UK's diplomatic mission in Russia. The official title is His Britannic Majesty's Ambassador to the Russian Federation.

Between 1844 and 1860 the status of the head of mission in Saint Petersburg was reduced from Ambassador to Envoy Extraordinary and Plenipotentiary. The capital of Russia, and later of the Soviet Union (from 1922 to 1991), moved to Moscow in 1918.

== List of heads of mission ==
For the envoys to Russia from the Court of St James's before the creation of the United Kingdom of Great Britain and Ireland in 1801, see List of ambassadors of the Kingdom of England to Russia (for the period until 1707) and List of ambassadors of Great Britain to Russia (for the years 1707 to 1800).

=== Ambassadors extraordinary and plenipotentiary ===
1800-1801: Diplomatic relations were suspended during the Second League of Armed Neutrality.

- 1801–1802: The Lord St Helens
- 1802–1804: Sir John Borlase Warren, Bt
- 1804–1806: Lord Granville Leveson-Gower
- 1805–1806: The Lord Cathcart
- 1807: Marquess of Douglas and Clydesdale Special Mission
- 1807: Lord Granville Leveson-Gower (again)
- 1807–1812: diplomatic relations suspended following Treaty of Tilsit
- 1812: Edward Thornton Plenipotentiary to negotiate at Stockholm
- 1812–1820: The Viscount Cathcart (created Earl Cathcart while in post in 1814)
- 1820–1825: Sir Charles Bagot
  - 1820–1824: Hon. Frederick Cathcart Minister Plenipotentiary ad interim
  - 1824–1825: Edward Michael Ward Minister Plenipotentiary ad interim
- 1825–1826: The Viscount Strangford
  - 1825–1828 : Edward Cromwell Disbrowe Minister Plenipotentiary ad interim
- 1828–1832: Sir William à Court, Bt
  - 1828–1832: Hon. William Temple Minister Plenipotentiary ad interim
- 1832–1833: Sir Stratford Canning (nominally ambassador, but did not go)
  - 1832–1835: Hon. John Duncan Bligh Minister Plenipotentiary ad interim
- 1835–1837: The Earl of Durham
- 1837–1838: John Ralph Milbanke Minister Plenipotentiary ad interim
- 1838–1841: The Marquess of Clanricarde
- 1841–1844: The Lord Stuart de Rothesay

=== Envoys extraordinary and ministers plenipotentiary ===
- 1844–1851 : John Bloomfield (succeeded as Baron Bloomfield while in post in 1846)
- 1851–1854 : Sir George Hamilton Seymour
- 1854–1856: No representation due to the Crimean War
- 1856–1858 : The Lord Wodehouse
- 1858–1860 : Sir John Crampton, Bt

=== Ambassadors ===
Name	Tenure begin	Tenure end	British monarch	Russian monarch/leader
Sir John Crampton, Bt	1860	1861	Queen Victoria	Emperor Alexander II
The Lord Napier	1861	1864	Queen Victoria	Emperor Alexander II
Sir Andrew Buchanan, Bt	1864	1867	Queen Victoria	Emperor Alexander II
The Earl Vane	1867	1871	Queen Victoria	Emperor Alexander II
Lord Augustus Loftus	1871	1879	Queen Victoria	Emperor Alexander II
The Earl of Dufferin	1879	1881	Queen Victoria	Emperor Alexander II
Sir Edward Thornton	1881	1884	Queen Victoria	Emperor Alexander III
Sir Robert Morier	1884	1893	Queen Victoria	Emperor Alexander III
Sir Frank Lascelles	1894	1895	Queen Victoria	Emperor Nicholas II→ Emperor Michael II
Sir Nicholas Roderick O'Conor	1895	1898	Queen Victoria	Emperor Nicholas II→ Emperor Michael II
Sir Charles Stewart Scott	1898	1904	Queen Victoria	Emperor Nicholas II→ Emperor Michael II
Sir Charles Hardinge	1904	1906	King Edward VII	Emperor Nicholas II→ Emperor Michael II
Sir Arthur Nicolson, Bt	1906	1910	King Edward VII	Emperor Nicholas II→ Emperor Michael II
Sir George Buchanan	1910	1918	King George V→ King Edward VIII→ King George VI	Emperor Nicholas II→ Emperor Michael II
no representation from 26 December 1918	1918	1924	King George V→ King Edward VIII→ King George VI	Vladimir Lenin
Sir Robert MacLeod Hodgson	1924	1927	King George V→ King Edward VIII→ King George VI	Joseph Stalin
no representation following a crisis in 1927	1927	1929	King George V→ King Edward VIII→ King George VI	Joseph Stalin
Sir Esmond Ovey	1929	1933	King George V→ King Edward VIII→ King George VI	Joseph Stalin
The Viscount Chilston	1933	1939		Joseph Stalin
Sir William Seeds	1939	1940	King George VI	Joseph Stalin
Hon. Sir Stafford Cripps	1940	1942	King George VI	Joseph Stalin
Sir Archibald Clark Kerr	1942	1946	King George VI	Joseph Stalin
Sir Maurice Peterson	1946	1949	King George VI	Joseph Stalin
Sir David Kelly	1949	1951	King George VI	Joseph Stalin
Sir Alvary Gascoigne	1951	1953	King George VI	Joseph Stalin
Sir William Hayter	1953	1957	Queen Elizabeth II	Georgy Malenkov→ Nikita Khrushchev
Sir Patrick Reilly	1957	1960	Queen Elizabeth II	Nikita Khrushchev
Sir Frank Roberts	1960	1962	Queen Elizabeth II	Nikita Khrushchev
Sir Humphrey Trevelyan	1962	1965	Queen Elizabeth II	Nikita Khrushchev
Sir Geoffrey Harrison	1965	1968	Queen Elizabeth II	Leonid Brezhnev
Sir Duncan Wilson	1968	1971	Queen Elizabeth II	Leonid Brezhnev
Sir John Killick	1971	1973	Queen Elizabeth II	Leonid Brezhnev
Sir Terence Garvey	1973	1976	Queen Elizabeth II	Leonid Brezhnev
Sir Howard Smith	1976	1978	Queen Elizabeth II	Leonid Brezhnev
Sir Curtis Keeble	1978	1982	Queen Elizabeth II	Leonid Brezhnev
Sir Iain Sutherland	1982	1985	Queen Elizabeth II	Yuri Andropov→ Konstantin Chernenko→ Mikhail Gorbachev
Sir Bryan Cartledge	1985	1988	Queen Elizabeth II	Mikhail Gorbachev
Sir Rodric Braithwaite	1988	1992	Queen Elizabeth II	Mikhail Gorbachev
Sir Brian Fall	1992	1995	Queen Elizabeth II	Boris Yeltsin
Sir Andrew Wood	1995	2000	Queen Elizabeth II	Boris Yeltsin
Sir Roderic Lyne	2000	2004	Queen Elizabeth II	Vladimir Putin
Sir Anthony Brenton	2004	2008	Queen Elizabeth II	Vladimir Putin
Dame Anne Pringle	2008	2011	Queen Elizabeth II	Dmitry Medvedev
Sir Tim Barrow	2011	2015	Queen Elizabeth II	Dmitry Medvedev→ Vladimir Putin
Sir Laurie Bristow	2016	2020	Queen Elizabeth II	Vladimir Putin
Dame Deborah Bronnert	January 2020	2023	Queen Elizabeth II→ King Charles III	Vladimir Putin
Nigel Casey	November 2023	—	King Charles III	Vladimir Putin

== See also ==
- List of ambassadors of Russia to the United Kingdom
