= Lewis De Visme =

British diplomat

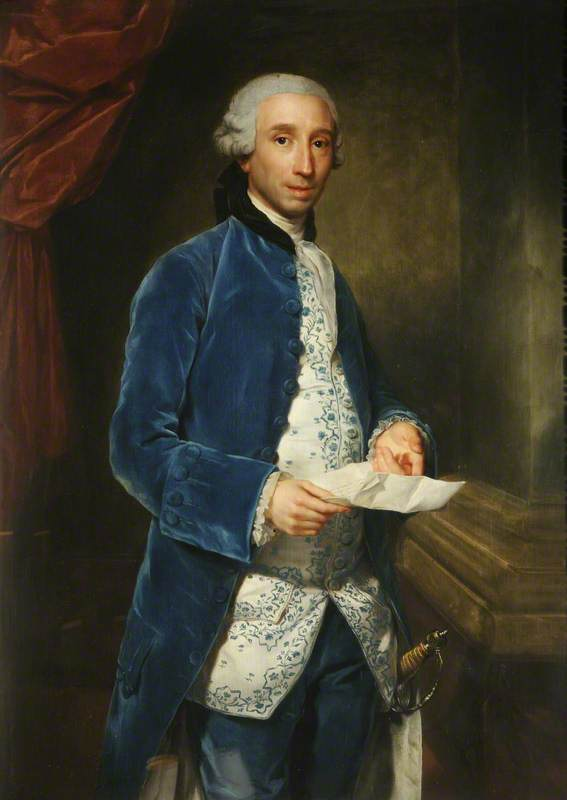
Portrait of Louis de Visme by Anton Raphael Mengs, painted sometime between 1763-1767, Christ Church Picture Gallery

Lewis Devisme (25 September 1720 – 4 September 1776 Stockholm, Sweden) was a British diplomat.

== Family ==
Christened on 7 October 1720 at the French Huguenot Church of St Martin Orgar in Martin Lane, Cannon Street, London, Lewis Devisme was the fourth child and third son of Philippe de Visme, a successful City merchant, by Marianne de la Mejanelle his wife. Ostensibly, he appears to have been named after his godfather, Louis Ragueneau de la Chainaye, but his father may have had his own uncle, Louis de Visme of Gouy L'Hopital in Picardy, at the forefront of his mind when he came to think of a name for his new son.

Lewis's father Philippe was a Huguenot refugee who had been born in Gouy L'Hopital in September 1687, third son of Pierre de Visme and Marie Le Roy. He emigrated to London at some time before his naturalisation by Oath Roll in January 1710, perhaps being joined by his elder brother, Pierre or Peter de Visme, shortly before the latter was naturalised by an Act of Parliament in July 1717. Philippe was married by special licence at the Spring Gardens Chapel in the Strand on 26 July 1716, and together Philippe and Marianne had a total of 13 children.

Living initially in the parish of St Lawrence Jewry, the brothers Peter and Philip Devisme later moved to the parish of St Mary Aldermary in the vicinity of Bow Lane off Cheapside at the back of St Paul's Cathedral, before moving to the parish of St Bartholomew-by-the-Exchange where Philippe had offices in Throgmorton Street. Although granted the Freedom of the City of London in October 1728, he later took up residence at Clapham, where he died on 16 October 1756. The registers of Holy Trinity Church there prove that one 'Philip Devisme of this parish' was buried in its churchyard on 25 October 1756. His widow Marianne survived him until her own death at Clapham on 16 February 1779.

== Career ==
De Visme was educated at Westminster School in London before entering Christ Church, Oxford, where he graduated as Bachelor of Arts in 1743 and Master of Arts in 1746. Ordained as a Deacon, he later abandoned his career in the clergy in favour of His Majesty's Diplomatic Service.

In 1763 De Visme was appointed Secretary to the British Embassy at St Petersburg, Russia, followed by an appointment as Minister Plenipotentiary to the Elector of Bavaria. He represented Britain at the Diet of Ratisbon from 1769 until his assignment to the Swedish Court in 1773, where he ranked as Envoy Extraordinary and Minister Plenipotentiary in Stockholm.

Lewis De Visme died in Stockholm on 4 September 1776, after a 'few days illness.' The London Gazette noted that Devisme was: "...greatly lamented, having during his Residence here gained the Esteem of all Ranks of People."
