= Onslow Burrish =

British diplomat (d. 1758)

Onslow Burrish (died 1758) was a British envoy in the Low Countries and various sovereign states in what is now Germany (then under the Holy Roman Empire.

== Career ==
Burrish was appointed "to be his Majesty's Resident at the Court of Brussels [the capitol of the Austrian Netherlands], and also at that of Liège" in 1743. Afterwards he was Minister to Bavaria 1745–58 and concurrently to Baden-Baden and Baden-Durlach (at that time separate margraviates), and to Brunswick-Wolfenbüttel, Cologne and Hesse-Cassel. Later he was sent to Regensburg as part of Lord Newcastle's effort to secure the election of Maria Theresa's son, the future Emperor Joseph II, as King of the Romans (a title of the Holy Roman Empire that carried enormous prestige but little real power) in order to keep that title in the control of Britain's ally Austria.

== Publications ==
- Batavia illustrata: or, A view of the policy and commerce of the United Provinces, particularly of Holland : with an enquiry into the alliances of the States General with the Emperor, France, Spain, and Great Britain, London, 1728; second edition 1742; modern reproductions
