= Reginald Tower =

British diplomat

Sir Reginald Thomas Tower KCMG CVO FSA (1 September 1860 – 21 January 1939) was a British diplomat whose career lasted from 1885 to 1920.

== Early life ==
Tower was educated at Harrow School and then Trinity College, Cambridge, where he graduated with an MA in 1887.

== Diplomatic career ==
Reginald Tower served in the following diplomatic positions:

- 1885–1892: Diplomatic Attaché in Constantinople
- 1892–1893: Second Secretary to the British Legation in Madrid
- 1893–1894: Second Secretary to the British Legation in Copenhagen
- 1894–1896: Second Secretary to the British Legation in Berlin
- 1896–1900: Second Secretary to the British Legation in Washington, D.C.
- 1900–1901: Secretary of the British Legation in Peking
- 1901–1903: Envoy Extraordinary and Minister Plenipotentiary to the King of Siam, and Consul-General in Siam, his first position as head of a diplomatic mission. He arrived in Bangkok to take up his post in late December 1901.
- 1903–1906: Minister Resident in Bavaria and Württemberg
- 1906–1910: Envoy Extraordinary and Minister Plenipotentiary in Mexico
- 1910–1919: Envoy Extraordinary and Minister Plenipotentiary in Argentina
- 1911–1919: Minister Plenipotentiary in Paraguay
- 1919–1920: Temporary Administrator to the Free City of Danzig, and High Commissioner of the League of Nations at Danzig

Tower's letters (some typed, mostly handwritten) when he was Secretary of Legation at Peking to Sir Ernest Satow, his superior and the Minister in Peking 1900-06, are in the Satow Papers held at the National Archives of the UK. Satow felt that Tower would have been a worthy successor.

In 1907, while British ambassador to Mexico, Tower donated a trophy in order to establish the Copa México. For this reason, in the early days of the competition it was known as the Copa Tower.

Tower was the British ambassador in Argentina and Paraguay for the duration of the First World War. During the war years he worked energetically to secure British wheat imports from Argentina, and to persuade British-owned companies to suspend German employees and refuse to do business with German firms.

In 1904 Tower was awarded the Grand Cross of the Friedrich Order of Württemberg. He was made a Commander of the Royal Victorian Order in 1906, and a Knight Commander of the Order of St Michael and St George in the 1911 Coronation Honours. He retired in 1920. Three portraits are held by the National Portrait Gallery, London.

Reginald Tower was a member of the Travellers' Club and the Royal Automobile Club.
