= George Stepney =

English poet and diplomat

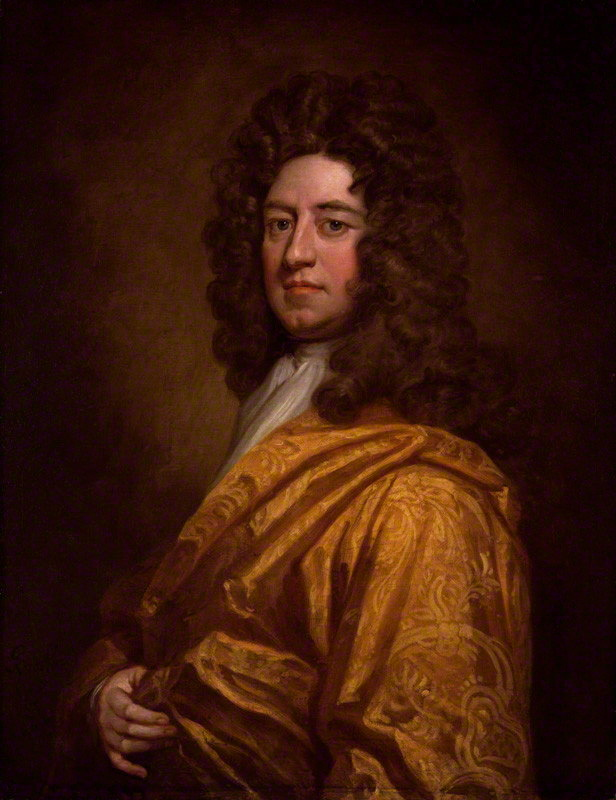
George Stepney

George Stepney (1663 – 15 September 1707) was an English poet and diplomat.

Stepney was the son of George Stepney, groom of the chamber to Charles II, and was born at Westminster. He was admitted on the foundation of Westminster School in 1676, and in 1682 became a scholar of Trinity College, Cambridge, becoming a fellow of his college in 1687.

Through his friend Charles Montagu, afterwards Earl of Halifax, he entered the diplomatic service, and in 1692 was sent as envoy to Brandenburg. He represented William III at various other German courts, and in 1702 was sent to Vienna, where he had already acted as envoy in 1693. In Nov 1697 he was elected a fellow of the Royal Society

In 1705 Prince Eugene of Savoy requested Stepney's withdrawal on the grounds of his alleged favouritism towards the Hungarian insurgents, but the demand was taken back at the request of John Churchill, 1st Duke of Marlborough, who had great confidence in Stepney. He was, nevertheless, removed in 1706 to The Hague. In the following year he returned to England in the hope of recovering from a severe illness, but died in Chelsea, London, and was buried in Westminster Abbey.

Stepney had a full and accurate knowledge of German affairs, and was a great letter-writer. Among his correspondents was Gottfried Leibniz, with whom he was on friendly terms. Much of his official and other correspondence is preserved in the letters and papers of Sir John Ellis (British Library Add MS 28875-28956), purchased from the Earl of Macclesfield in 1872, and others are available in the record office. He contributed a version of the eighth satire of Juvenal to the translation (1693) of the satires by John Dryden and others. Samuel Johnson, who included him in his Lives of the Poets, called him a very licentious translator, and remarked that he did not recompense his neglect of the author by beauties of his own.
