= Brook Taylor (diplomat) =

British diplomat

Sir Brook Taylor (1776 – 15 October 1846) was a British diplomat.

The younger brother of Sir Herbert Taylor, soldier and private secretary to the Sovereign, Brook Taylor joined the diplomatic service and was British minister to Hesse-Cassel and Cologne 1801–06, to Denmark in 1807, to Württemberg 1814–20, to Bavaria 1820–28 and to Prussia 1828–31. He was knighted GCH in 1822, and was admitted to the Privy Council in 1829. He deputised for Sir Herbert during the latter's absences from the court.
