= Sir Andrew Napier Noble, 2nd Baronet =

British diplomat (1904–1987)

Sir Andrew Noble KCMG
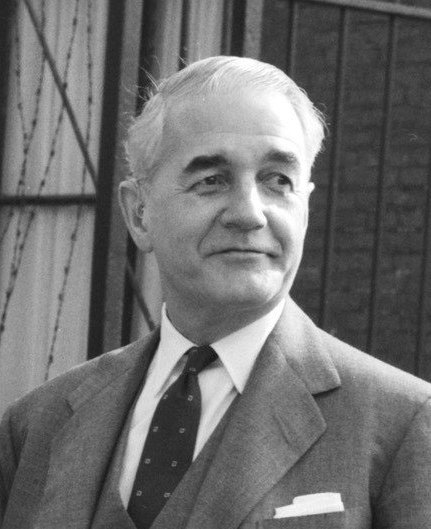
- Noble in 1961

British Ambassador to the Netherlands
- In office 1960–1964
- Preceded by: Sir Paul Mason
- Succeeded by: Sir Peter Garran

British Ambassador to Mexico
- In office 1956–1960
- Preceded by: Sir William Sullivan
- Succeeded by: Sir Peter Garran

British Ambassador to Poland
- In office 1954–1956
- Preceded by: Sir Francis Shepherd
- Succeeded by: Sir Eric Berthoud

British Ambassador to Finland
- In office 1951–1954
- Preceded by: Sir Oswald Scott
- Succeeded by: Sir Michael Cresswell

Personal details
- Born: 16 September 1904
- Died: 30 April 1987 (aged 82)
- Children: 3 including Iain
- Education: Balliol College, Oxford
- Occupation: Diplomat

Sir Andrew Napier Noble, 2nd Baronet (16 September 1904 – 30 April 1987) was a British diplomat who served as ambassador to Finland, Poland, Mexico and the Netherlands.

== Early life and education ==
Noble was born on 16 September 1904, the son of John Henry Brunel Noble, later created a Baronet, and Amie (died 1973), daughter of S. A. Walker Waters. He was educated at Eton College and Balliol College, Oxford, and succeeded his father as the second baronet in 1938.

He was an older brother of the Conservative member of parliament and life peer Michael Noble, Baron Glenkinglas.

== Career ==
Noble entered the Foreign Office in 1928 and was appointed third secretary. In 1931, he was posted to Rio de Janeiro as third secretary, and two years later was transferred to Rome as second secretary. After returning to the Foreign Office in 1938, he was sent to China as acting first secretary in 1940, and acted as chargé d'affaires there in 1941. After another spell in the Foreign Office, he was transferred to Buenos Aires in 1945 as acting counsellor, and acted as chargé d'affaires there in 1945 and 1946. He then served as an inspector of foreign service establishments and assistant under-secretary for foreign affairs (consular). From 1949 to 1951, he served as assistant under-secretary for foreign affairs (Northern and Southern Europe and Latin America).

Noble then served as Envoy Extraordinary and Minister Plenipotentiary to Finland from 1951 to 1954. He was ambassador to Poland from 1954 to 1956; ambassador to Mexico from 1956 to 1960; and ambassador to the Netherlands from 1960 to 1964.

== Personal life and death ==
Noble married Sigrid (Sisi) Michelet, daughter of a member of the Royal Norwegian Diplomatic Service in 1934, and they had two sons and a daughter. In retirement he wrote a History of the Nobles of Ardmore and of Ardkinglas.

Noble died on 30 April 1987, aged 82. He was succeeded in the baronetcy by his elder son Iain.

== Honours ==
Noble was appointed Companion of the Order of St Michael and St George (CMG) in the 1947 Birthday Honours, and promoted to Knight Commander (KCMG) in the 1954 Birthday Honours.

== See also ==
- Finland–United Kingdom relations
- Poland–United Kingdom relations
- Mexico–United Kingdom relations
- Netherlands–United Kingdom relations

Baronetage of the United Kingdom
Preceded by John Henry Brunel Noble	Baronet (of Ardkinglas and Eilean Iarmain); 1938–1987	Succeeded by Iain Andrew Noble

Diplomatic posts
Preceded by Sir Oswald Scott	British Ambassador to Finland; 1951–1954	Succeeded by Sir Michael Cresswell
Preceded by Sir Francis Shepherd	British Ambassador to Poland; 1954–1956	Succeeded by Sir Eric Berthoud
Preceded by Sir William Sullivan	British Ambassador to Mexico; 1956–1960	Succeeded by Sir Peter Garran
Preceded by Sir Paul Mason	British Ambassador to the Netherlands; 1960–1964	Succeeded by Sir Peter Garran
