= John Murray (diplomat, born 1883) =

British diplomat (1883–1937)

Sir John Murray CMG

British envoy extraordinary and minister plenipotentiary to Mexico
- In office 1935–1937
- Preceded by: Sir Edmund Monson
- Succeeded by: Sir Owen O'Malley

Personal details
- Born: 1883
- Died: 15 April 1937 (aged 53) Berlin
- Education: King's College, Cambridge
- Occupation: Diplomat

Sir John Murray (1883 – 15 April 1937) was a British diplomat who served as envoy extraordinary and minister plenipotentiary to Mexico from 1935 to 1937.

== Early life and education ==
Murray was born in 1883, the son of Malcolm B. Murray. He was educated at Eton College and King's College, Cambridge where he took a degree in Mechanical Sciences in 1905.

== Career ==
Murray joined the Egyptian civil service in 1905, worked at the Ministry of Public Works as assistant director of works in Cairo, and was promoted to director in 1912. He then transferred to the Egyptian Ministry of Finance in 1913, and in 1917 was appointed acting secretary-general of the state domains department.

In 1919, after returning to England, he was appointed head of the Egyptian section at the Foreign Office where he spent the next 12 years, and was promoted to the rank of counsellor. His knowledge and experience of Egypt was of great assistance to successive Secretaries of State at the Foreign Office. He played a key role in the preparation of the groundwork which led to the signing of the Anglo-Egyptian Treaty of 1936. According to The Times, "it was very largely due to his work during this period that the present treaty was brought to fruition."

In 1931, he was posted to the British Embassy at Rome as counsellor where he remained until 1934. The following year he was appointed envoy extraordinary and minister plenipotentiary to Mexico, a post he held until his death while in office in 1937.

== Personal life and death ==
Murray married Inez James in 1911. There were no children.

Murray died while in office on 15 April 1937 in Berlin following an operation. He was 53.

== Honours ==
Murray was appointed Companion of the Order of St Michael and St George (CMG) in the 1925 Birthday Honours.

== See also ==
- Mexico–United Kingdom relations

Diplomatic posts
Preceded by Sir Edmund Monson	British envoy extraordinary and minister plenipotentiary to Mexico; 1935–1937	Succeeded by Sir Owen O'Malley
