= Mexico–United Kingdom Free Trade Agreement =

Proposed free trade agreement between Mexico and the United Kingdom

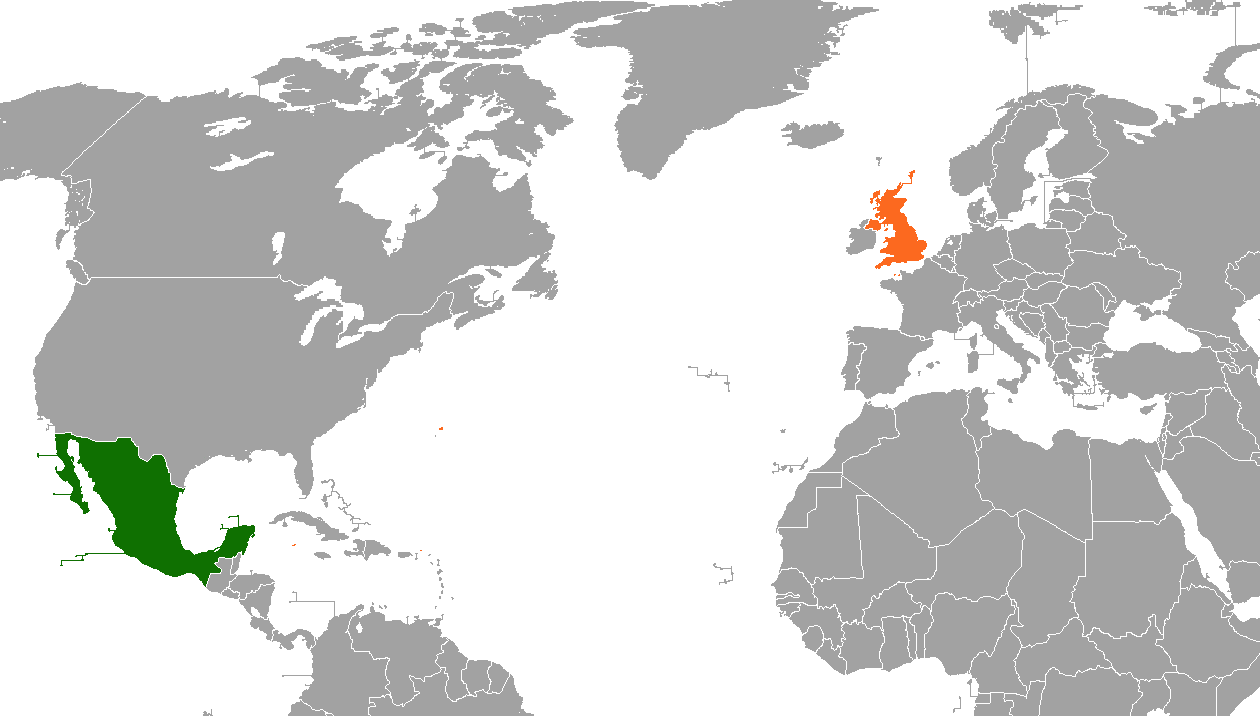
- United Kingdom Mexico
- Type: Free trade agreement
- Context: Trade agreement between Mexico and the United Kingdom
- Negotiators: (Mexico) Mexican Trade Ministers: Tatiana Clouthier (until 6 October 2022); Raquel Buenrostro Sánchez (until 1 October 2024); Marcelo Ebrard (from 1 October 2024); (United Kingdom) British Trade Ministers: Anne-Marie Trevelyan (until 6 September 2022); Kemi Badenoch (until 5 July 2024); Jonathan Reynolds (until 5 September 2025); Peter Kyle (until 20 July 2026); Jonathan Reynolds (from 20 July 2026)
- Parties: Mexico; United Kingdom
- Languages: English; Spanish

The Mexico–United Kingdom free trade agreement (MUKFTA) is a proposed free trade agreement which began negotiations on 20 May 2022. The trade agreement would be the third FTA to cover Mexico–UK trade, superseding the Mexico–UK Trade Continuity Agreement, extending the deal to cover financial, creative, digital, services and digital trade.

== History ==
From 1 July 2000 until 30 December 2020, trade between Mexico and the United Kingdom was governed by the Mexico–European Union Free Trade Agreement, while the UK was a member of the European Union. Following the withdrawal of the United Kingdom from the European Union, the UK and Mexico signed a continuity trade agreement on 15 December 2020, based on the EU free trade agreement; the agreement entered into force on 1 June 2021.

On 20 May 2022, Mexico and the United Kingdom announced their intentions start talks on a modernised free trade agreement; the agreement will supersede Mexico–United Kingdom Trade Continuity agreement.

== Negotiations ==
MUKFTA Round of Negotiations
Round	Dates	Location	Ref.
1	11–15 July 2022	Mexico City	
2	31 October–11 November 2022	Virtual meeting	
3	15–19 May 2023	Mexico City	

Trade negotiations formally opened on 20 May 2022.

Due to slow progress in negotiating a new trade agreement, Mexico and the UK agreed in November 2023 to extend their continuity trade agreement for an additional year.

== See also ==
- Mexico–United Kingdom relations
- Free trade agreements of the United Kingdom
- Foreign relations of Mexico
- Foreign relations of the United Kingdom
