= Judith Macgregor =

British diplomat

Dame Judith Macgregor DCMG LVO DL
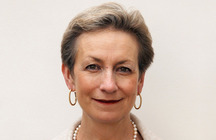
- Macgregor in 2014
- Born: 17 June 1952 (age 73); United Kingdom
- Occupation: Diplomat

Dame Judith Anne Macgregor DCMG LVO DL (née Brown; born 17 June 1952) is a British diplomat who was High Commissioner to South Africa from 2013 to 2017. She previously served as Ambassador to Slovakia from 2004 to 2007, and Ambassador to Mexico from 2009 to 2013.

== Career ==
Macgregor was educated at St Saviour's and St Olave's Church of England School and Lady Margaret Hall, Oxford. She joined the Diplomatic Service in 1976 and served at Belgrade, Prague and Paris, besides posts at the Foreign and Commonwealth Office (FCO), before being appointed ambassador to Slovakia 2004–07. She was Migration Director at the FCO 2007–09, ambassador to Mexico 2009–13, and High Commissioner to South Africa from October 2013 to March 2017.

Macgregor was appointed Lieutenant of the Royal Victorian Order (LVO) in 1992 on the occasion of a state visit by Queen Elizabeth II to Paris, where Macgregor was First Secretary. She was appointed Companion of the Order of St Michael and St George (CMG) in the 2012 New Year Honours and Dame Commander of the Order of St Michael and St George (DCMG) in the 2016 New Year Honours.

In August 2021, Macgregor was named as interim chair of the British Tourist Authority.

== Family ==
Macgregor is married to John Macgregor, a retired British ambassador. They have three sons and a daughter.

Diplomatic posts
Preceded by Ric Todd	British Ambassador to Slovakia; 2004–2007	Succeeded by Michael Roberts
Preceded by Giles Paxman	British Ambassador to Mexico; 2009–2013	Succeeded by Duncan Taylor
Preceded by Dame Nicola Brewer	British High Commissioner to South Africa; 2013–2017	Succeeded by Nigel Casey
