= Aretas Akers-Douglas =

Aretas Akers-Douglas may refer to:

- Aretas Akers-Douglas, 1st Viscount Chilston (1851–1926), British Conservative politician
- Aretas Akers-Douglas, 2nd Viscount Chilston (1876–1947), British diplomat
