= Noble baronets of Ardkinglas and Eilean Iarmain (1923) =

Escutcheon of the Noble baronets of Ardkinglas and Eilean Iarmain

The Noble baronetcy, of Ardkinglas, and Eilean Iarmain in the County of Argyll, was created in the Baronetage of the United Kingdom on 26 July 1923 for the businessman John Noble. He was the third son of the 1st Baronet of the 1902 creation.

== Noble baronets, of Ardkinglas and Eilean Iarmain (1923) ==
- Sir John Henry Brunel Noble, 1st Baronet (1865–1938)
- Sir Andrew Napier Noble, 2nd Baronet (1904–1987)
- Sir Iain Andrew Noble, 3rd Baronet (1935–2010)
- Sir Timothy Peter Noble, 4th Baronet (born 1943)

The heir apparent is the son of the presumed 4th Baronet, Lorne Andrew Wallace Noble (born 1980).

== Extended family ==
The Conservative politician and life peer Michael Noble, Baron Glenkinglas, was the third son of the 1st Baronet.
