= Edmund Monson =

Edmund Monson may refer to:

- Sir Edmund Monson, 1st Baronet (1834–1909), British diplomat
- Sir Edmund Monson, 3rd Baronet (1883–1969), British diplomat
