= Thomas Rapp =

Thomas Rapp may refer to:

- Tom Rapp, American singer and songwriter
- Thomas Rapp (diplomat), British diplomat
