= Peter Garran =

British diplomat (1910–1991)

Sir Peter Garran KCMG
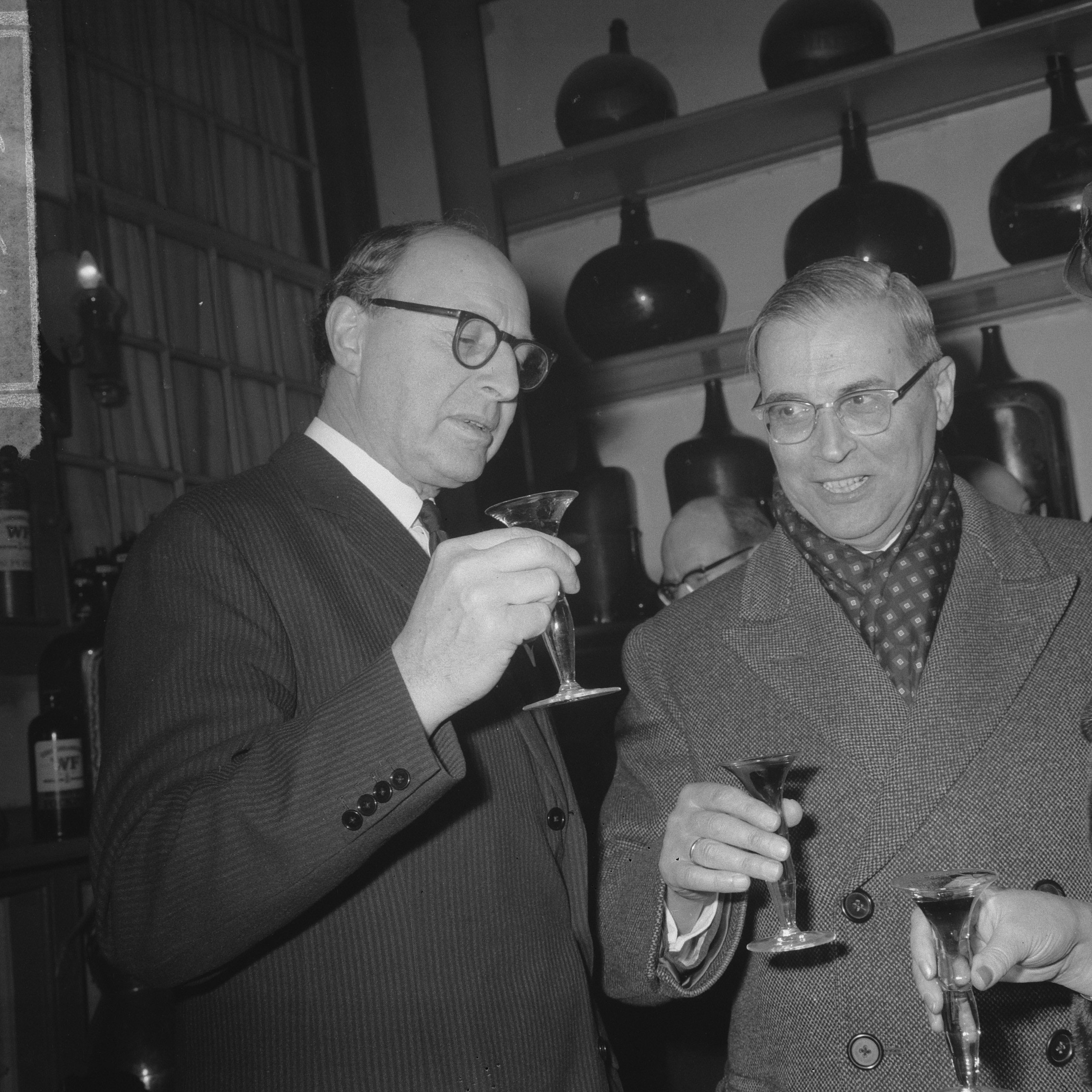
- Garran (left) with Dutch mayor, Gijs van Hall in 1965

British Ambassador to the Netherlands
- In office 1964–1970
- Preceded by: Sir Andrew Noble
- Succeeded by: Sir Edward Tomkins

British Ambassador to Mexico
- In office 1960–1964
- Preceded by: Sir Andrew Noble
- Succeeded by: Sir Nicolas Cheetham

Personal details
- Born: 15 January 1910
- Died: 5 July 1991 (aged 81)
- Children: 3
- Parent: Sir Robert Garran
- Education: University of Melbourne
- Occupation: Diplomat

Sir Isham Peter Garran (15 January 1910 – 5 July 1991) was an Australian-born British diplomat who served as ambassador to Mexico from 1960 to 1964 and ambassador to the Netherlands from 1964 to 1970.

== Early life and education ==
Garran was born on 15 January 1910, the son of Sir Robert Garran, GCMG, the first solicitor-general of Australia and Hilda Robson. He was educated at Melbourne Grammar School and Trinity College, University of Melbourne where he took a first class degree in classics.

== Career ==
Garran entered the Foreign Office in 1934, served as third secretary in Belgrade from 1937 to 1941 and then as second secretary at Lisbon from 1941 to 1944. After the War, having taken British citizenship, he was seconded to the Control Commission for Germany at Berlin as head of the Political Division, a post he held from 1947 to 1950. After two years at The Hague, he was appointed Inspector of Her Majesty's Foreign Service Establishments, remaining in the post from 1952 to 1954, and then minister (commercial) at Washington, where he served from 1955 to 1960.

Garran was Ambassador to Mexico from 1960 until 1964 when he was appointed Ambassador to the Netherlands, a post he held from 1964 until he retired from the Diplomatic Service in 1970.

In retirement, Garran was chairman of the Quality Assurance Council of the British Standards Institution, director of the Lend Lease Corporation of New South Wales, and chairman of Securicor, Nederland BV.

== Personal life and death ==
Garran married Mary Elisabeth (died 1991), daughter of Sir Richard Rawdon Stawell, KBE, in 1935, and they had two sons and a daughter.

Garran died on 5 July 1991, aged 81.

== Honours ==
Garran was appointed Companion of the Order of St Michael and St George (CMG) in the 1954 New Year Honours, and promoted to Knight Commander (KCMG) in the 1961 Birthday Honours.

== See also ==
- Mexico–United Kingdom relations
- Netherlands–United Kingdom relations

Diplomatic posts
Preceded by Sir Andrew Noble	British Ambassador to Mexico; 1960–1964	Succeeded by Sir Nicolas Cheetham
Preceded by Sir Andrew Noble	British Ambassador to the Netherlands; 1964–1970	Succeeded by Sir Edward Tomkins
