= Charles Bateman (diplomat) =

British diplomat (1892–1986)

Sir Charles Bateman KCMG MC

British Ambassador to Mexico
- In office 1944–1947
- Preceded by: Post established
- Succeeded by: Sir Thomas Rapp

British Ambassador to Poland
- In office 1950–1952
- Preceded by: Donald St Clair Gainer
- Succeeded by: Sir Francis Shepherd

Personal details
- Born: 4 January 1892
- Died: 7 November 1986 (aged 94)
- Education: University of London
- Occupation: Civil servant and Diplomat

Sir Charles Harold Bateman (4 January 1892 – 7 November 1986) was a British civil servant and diplomat who served as British Ambassador to Mexico from 1944 to 1947 and British Ambassador to Poland from 1950 to 1952.

== Early life and education ==
Bateman was born on 4 January 1892, the son of Charles Bateman. He was educated at University of London and Sorbonne University, Paris.

== Career ==
Bateman served in World War I with 2nd London Regiment (Royal Fusiliers) in Gallipoli and France, and with the Royal Artillery in France and Belgium, and was awarded the Military Cross.

Bateman entered the Diplomatic Service in 1920, and was posted to Chile as third secretary. In 1923, he was appointed second secretary. In 1929, having risen to first secretary, he was transferred to Baghdad in 1932, and there also served as acting counsellor in 1935. In 1937, he served as counsellor at Lisbon, and then during the following year as minister at Cairo, before he returned to the Foreign Office in 1940 where he served as head of the Egyptian Department.

In 1941, Bateman was sent to Mexico where he served as Envoy Extraordinary and Minister Plenipotentiary at the British legation in Mexico City. Diplomatic relations had been severed between the two countries after President Lázaro Cárdenas had expropriated oil reserves and facilities of foreign oil companies in Mexico and refused to pay compensation. After diplomatic relations were restored, ambassadors were exchanged, and Bateman was appointed as the first British Ambassador to Mexico, serving from 1944 to 1947. After serving as assistant under-secretary at the Foreign Office from 1948 to 1950, he was appointed British Ambassador to Poland, serving from 1950 to 1952.

== Personal life and death ==
Bateman married Bridget Kavanagh in 1940.

Bateman died on 7 November 1986, aged 94.

== Honours ==
Bateman was appointed Companion of the Order of St Michael and St George (CMG) in the 1937 New Year Honours, and promoted to Knight Commander (KCMG) in the 1950 Birthday Honours. In 1919, he was awarded the Military Cross (MC).

== See also ==
- Mexico–United Kingdom relations
- Poland–United Kingdom relations

Diplomatic posts
New office	British Ambassador to Mexico; 1944–1947	Succeeded by Sir Thomas Rapp
Preceded by Donald St Clair Gainer	British Ambassador to Poland; 1950–1952	Succeeded by Sir Francis Shepherd
