= John Taylor (diplomat) =

British diplomat (1895–1974)

Sir John William Taylor CMG KBE

British Ambassador to Mexico
- In office 1950–1954
- Preceded by: Sir Thomas Rapp
- Succeeded by: Sir William Sullivan

Personal details
- Born: 1 March 1895
- Died: 25 May 1974 (aged 79)
- Relations: Grandson: Duncan Taylor
- Children: 6 including Sir John Lang Taylor
- Education: University of Aberdeen
- Occupation: Diplomat

Sir John William Taylor (1 March 1895 – 25 May 1974) was a British diplomat who served as Ambassador to Mexico from 1950 to 1954.

== Early life and education ==
Taylor was born on 1 March 1895, the son of John S. Taylor of Aberdeen. He was educated at University of Aberdeen where he received his MA.

== Career ==
Taylor served during World War I with the Gordon Highlanders with the rank of Captain. After the War, he entered Foreign Service in 1919 and served in consular posts in France, Czechoslovakia, Austria, United States and was Commercial Secretary for Central America. He was Commercial Counsellor to Czechoslovakia at Prague from 1945 to 1946; Minister (Commercial) to Egypt at Cairo from 1946 to 1948, and Minister (Commercial) at the British Embassy in Washington, D.C. from 1948 to 1950. In 1950, he was appointed Ambassador to Mexico and held the post until retirement in 1954.

== Personal life and death ==
Taylor was chairman of the British Mexican Society from 1954 to 1964. He was director general of the Hispanic and Luso-Brazilian Councils from 1954 to 1962. He was a member of the Council of the Royal Geographical Society from 1958 to 1961; a member of the Council of the Royal Society of Arts from 1959 to 1965, and was awarded the Royal Society of Arts Silver Medal.

Taylor married three times. First to Rachel Lang and they had four sons. She died in 1925. Second to Margaret Simpson and they had two daughters. She died in 1961. Third, in 1961, to Joan Hickman. His son, Sir John Lang Taylor, was also a diplomat.

Taylor died on 25 May 1974, aged 79.

== Honours ==
Taylor was appointed Companion of the Order of St Michael and St George (CMG) in the 1947 New Year Honours. He was appointed Member of the Order of the British Empire (MBE) in the 1929 Birthday Honours, and promoted to Knight Commander (KBE) in the 1954 Birthday Honours. In 1958, he was awarded the Mexican Order of the Aztec Eagle, First Class. In 1959, he was awarded the Grand Cross of the Order of Merit of Chile.

== See also ==
- Mexico–United Kingdom relations

Diplomatic posts
Preceded by Sir Thomas Rapp	British Ambassador to Mexico; 1950–1954	Succeeded by Sir William Sullivan
