= William Sullivan (diplomat) =

British diplomat (1895–1971)

Sir William Sullivan KBE CMG

British Ambassador to Mexico
- In office 1954–1956
- Preceded by: Sir John Taylor
- Succeeded by: Sir Andrew Noble

British envoy extraordinary and minister plenipotentiary to Romania
- In office 1951–1954
- Preceded by: Sir Walter Roberts
- Succeeded by: Sir Dermot MacDermot

Personal details
- Born: 11 October 1895
- Died: 21 June 1971 (aged 75)
- Children: 1
- Education: Trinity College Dublin
- Occupation: Diplomat

Sir William John Sullivan (11 October 1895 – 21 June 1971) was a British diplomat who served as envoy extraordinary and minister plenipotentiary to Romania from 1951 to 1954 and ambassador of the United Kingdom to Mexico from 1954 to 1956.

== Early life and education ==
Sullivan was born on 11 October 1895, the son of William Charles Sullivan MD. He was educated at St Augustine's College, Kent and Trinity College Dublin.

== Career ==
Sullivan was commissioned into the army in 1915, and after he was invalided out of military service in 1916 went to work as an administrative officer at the Central Control regulating traffic in liquor. In 1920, he entered the consular service, and was posted successively to Tallinn in 1920; Bogota in 1924; Chicago in 1927; Marseille in 1930; Genoa in 1935; and Madrid and Valencia in 1936.

In 1939, he was attached to the Imperial Defence College before he was posted to Trieste as consul. From 1940 to 1941, he was part of the Spears Mission in London before he was transferred to Berne where he spent the duration of the war as counsellor and commercial secretary. After the war, he was a member of the UK delegation to the Paris Peace Conference and the Council of Foreign Ministers in New York. He also served from 1945 to 1950 as political adviser to the Commander, British-United States Zone in Trieste.

In 1951, he was appointed envoy extraordinary and minister plenipotentiary to Romania, a post he held until 1954 when he was posted to Mexico as ambassador, serving until 1956. From 1956 to 1957, he was a member of the British permanent delegation to the United Nations.

== Personal life and death ==
Sullivan married Catherine Mary Meynell in 1922 and they had one son.

Sullivan died on 21 June 1971, aged 75.

== Honours ==
Sullivan was appointed Companion of the Order of St Michael and St George (CMG) in the 1950 New Year Honours. He was appointed Commander of the Order of the British Empire (CBE) in the 1938 New Year Honours, and promoted to Knight Commander (KBE) in the 1956 New Year Honours.

== See also ==
- Mexico–United Kingdom relations
- Romania–United Kingdom relations

Diplomatic posts
Preceded by Sir Walter Roberts	British envoy extraordinary and minister plenipotentiary to Romania; 1951–1954	Succeeded by Sir Dermot MacDermot
Preceded by Sir John Taylor	British Ambassador to Mexico; 1954–1956	Succeeded by Sir Andrew Noble
