= Paxman =

Paxman may refer to:

== Organisations ==
- Paxman Musical Instruments, a British manufacturer of horns
- Paxman Promotions, a video game reissue and compilation publisher
- Paxman (engines), originally Davey, Paxman & Davey, Engineers latterly part of English Electric and GEC and now part of MAN AG as MAN B&W Diesel Ltd, Paxman

== People ==
- Jeremy Paxman (born 1950), Yorkshire broadcaster, journalist and author
- Giles Paxman (1951−2025), British diplomat
- Mike Paxman (born 1953), multi-instrumentalist and record producer
- Stephen Paxman (born 1970), Australian rules footballer

== Other uses ==
- Paxman, a fictional character in the Darkover series by Marion Zimmer Bradley
