= Charles Bateman =

Charles Bateman may refer to:

- Charles Bateman (architect) (1863–1947), English architect
- Charles Bateman (actor) (1930–2024), American actor
- Sir Charles Bateman (diplomat), British civil servant and diplomat
- Charles Bateman (racing driver), British racing driver in 2008 Porsche Carrera Cup Great Britain
- Charles J. Bateman (1851–1940), American architect
