= Embassy of the United Kingdom, Mexico City =

Coordinates: 19.4258°N 99.1675°W

British Embassy, Mexico City
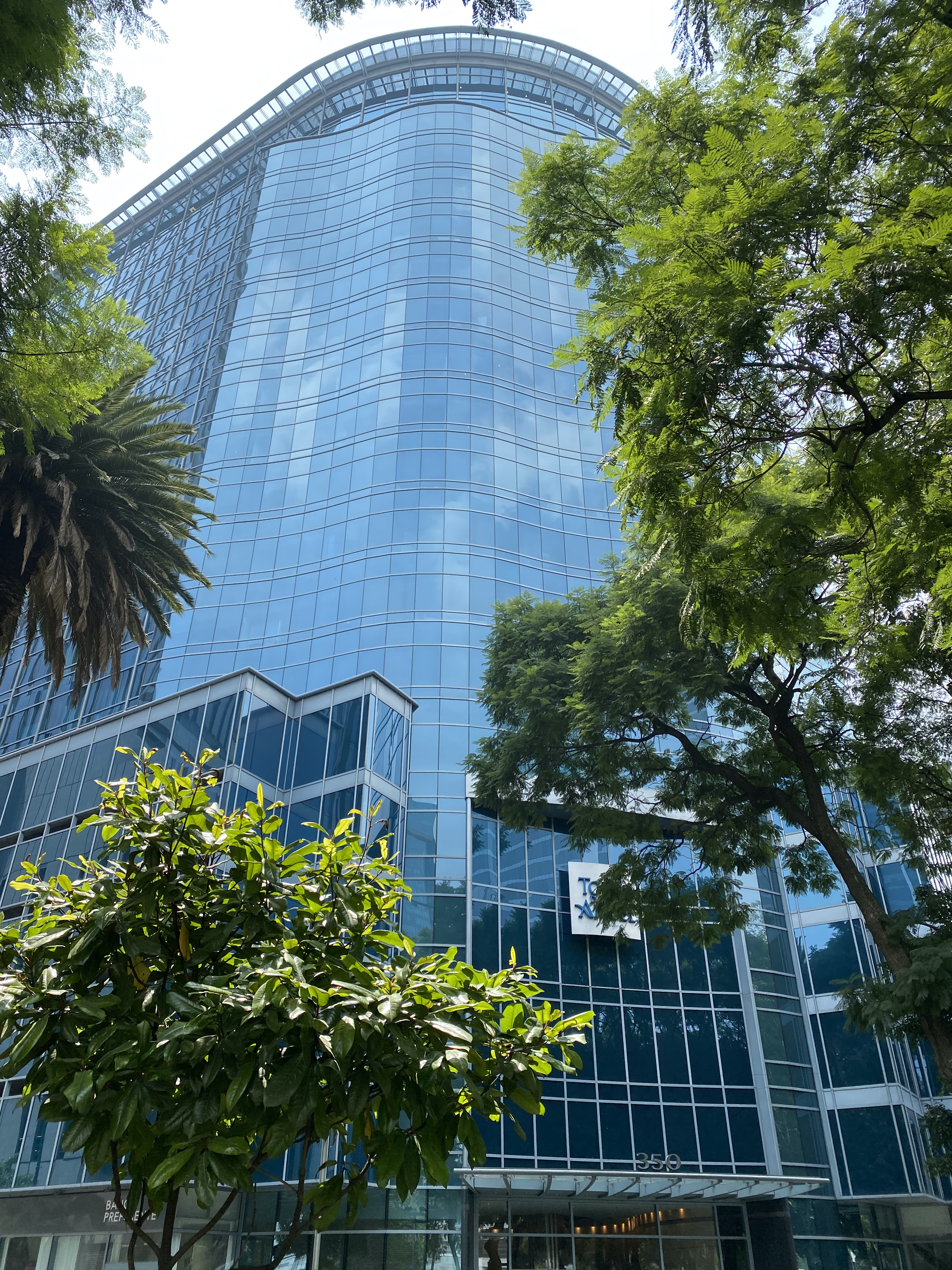
- Location: Mexico City, Mexico
- Address: Paseo de la Reforma 350; 20th Floor Torre del Angel; Col. Juárez, CP. 06600, Mexico City, Mexico
- Ambassador: Susannah Goshko
- Website: British Embassy, Mexico City

The British Embassy in Mexico City is the chief diplomatic mission of the United Kingdom in Mexico. The embassy is located on Paseo de la Reforma 350 20th Floor, Torre del Angel.

== History ==
By 1907, very few countries maintained embassies in a few capitals around the world. The usual form of diplomatic mission was a Legation, headed by a Minister Extraordinary and Plenipotentiary. At that time the British minister in Mexico was Sir Reginald Tower.

Since the establishment of diplomatic relations between Mexico and the United Kingdom, in 1825, Sir Reginald Tower's predecessors had tried unsuccessfully to find a suitable rented premises for the "House of the Legation", as it was then called. In addition, it had to serve as both a house for the minister and offices.

After a series of negotiations, in May 1910 the land in Rio Lerma to build the embassy was acquired from John Benjamin Body (representative in Mexico of Messrs S. Pearson and Son).

Shortly thereafter, Charles Grove Johnson, an English architect living in Mexico, submitted his designs to the Office of Works in London. Construction of the building began in September 1910. The original work included the use of onyx and marble, as well as the construction of a ballroom. After surviving the earthquake of June 7, 1911, the building was visited by the guests of then Minister Thomas Hohler, who were attending a reception for the coronation of King George V and Queen Mary. Hohler reported to London: "His Excellency, President Porfirio Díaz, expressed his great satisfaction at entering the first Legation owned and built by a foreign government in Mexico."

The first of the British ministers to occupy the legation was Sir Francis Stronge (1911–1913). Even though the furniture had not arrived from London and two rooms were infested with pests, Stronge was very pleased with the house. Not much is known about the history of the embassy during the period of the Mexican Revolution (1910–1920), when the diplomatic relations between the two countries were broken between 1914 and 1925.

The building remained the home of the minister and offices of the legation until 1938 when diplomatic relations were broken again as a result of the expropriation of British interests in the oil industry by President Lázaro Cárdenas. After the relations were resumed in 1941, the building was used mainly as offices. In the 1970s and 1980s, expansions were made that allowed more than 100 people to work in the building.

The earthquake of September 19, 2017 caused structural damage to the building.

In 2021, the embassy was moved to Torre del Angel in Paseo de la Reforma. The former location of the embassy was in Rio Lerma 71, in the Colonia Cuauhtémoc neighbourhood.

In April 2024 there was an incident where former Ambassador Jon Benjamin was filmed pointing a gun at staff. Subsequently, Rachel Brazier became the chargé d'affaires. In November 2024, Susannah Goshko was appointed Ambassador to Mexico.

== Gallery ==
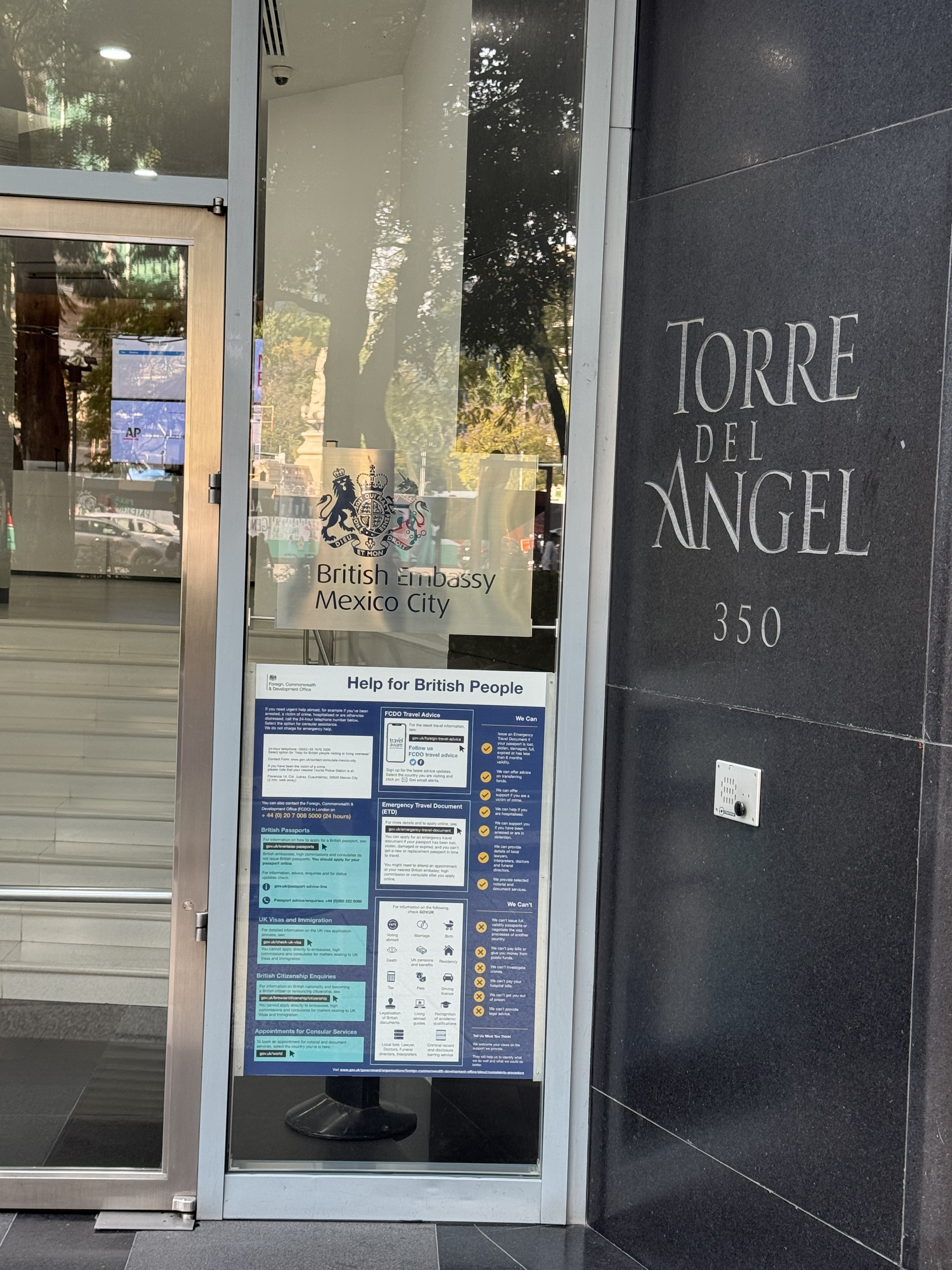
Placard of the British Embassy

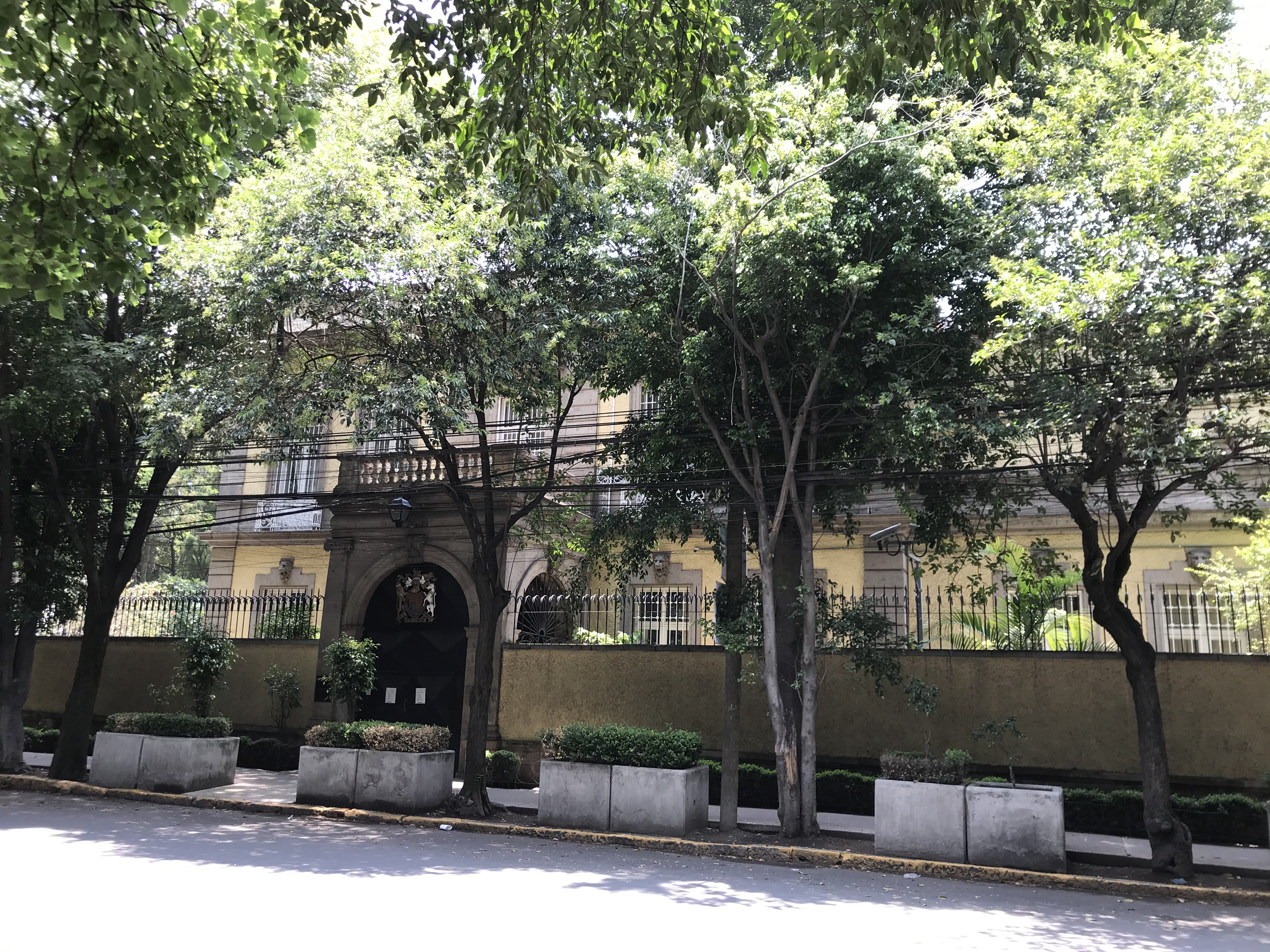
Former location of the British Embassy on Rio Lerma

== See also ==
- Mexico–United Kingdom relations
- List of diplomatic missions in Mexico
- List of ambassadors of the United Kingdom to Mexico
