= Noble baronets =

Set index for Noble baronets

There have been three baronetcies created for persons with the surname Noble, all in the Baronetage of the United Kingdom. As of 2026, two are extant.

- Noble baronets of Ardmore and Ardardan Noble (1902)
- Noble baronets of West Denton Hall (1921): see Baron Kirkley
- Noble baronets of Ardkinglas and Eilean Iarmain (1923)
