= Esmond Ovey =

British diplomat (1879–1963)

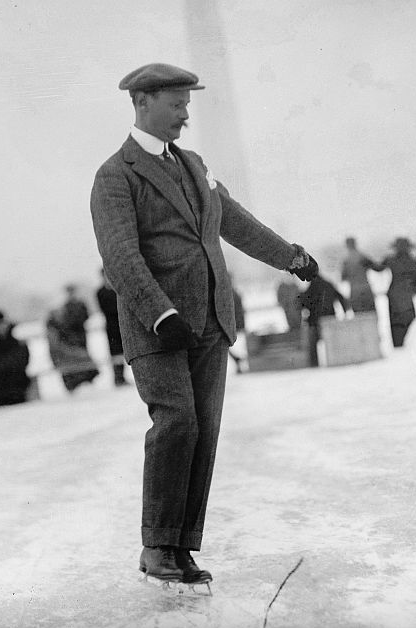
Esmond Ovey skating in Washington, D.C., 1912 (Harris & Ewing Collection, Library of Congress)

Sir Esmond Ovey GCMG MVO (23 July 1879 – 30 May 1963) was a British diplomat who was ambassador to the Soviet Union, Belgium and Argentina.

== Career ==
Esmond Ovey was educated at Eton College and entered the Diplomatic Service as an attaché in 1902. He was appointed to Tangier but did not go there that year, instead being sent to Stockholm to assist with extra work in the period preceding the Russo-Japanese War. He did go to Tangier in 1904, was promoted to Third Secretary in 1905 and posted to Paris in 1906. While at the Paris embassy he was decorated with the MVO when King Edward VII visited Biarritz in 1907. In 1908 he was posted to Washington, D.C. where he met, and in May 1909 married, Blanche, daughter of Rear-Admiral William H. Emory, United States Navy. In the same month he was promoted to Second Secretary.

In 1912 Ovey was transferred to Sofia and in 1913 to Constantinople. When the Ottoman Empire came into the First World War the British Ambassador, Sir Louis Mallet, left Constantinople with all his staff except Ovey, who was seriously ill with typhoid fever. "Luckily he was able to be moved to the American Embassy but Wangenheim, the German Ambassador, endeavoured to obtain Ovey's removal before he was sufficiently recovered. It was lucky that his wife was an American." Ovey was transferred to Norway where he remained for the rest of the war, acting as chargé d'affaires when the Minister was absent. He was promoted to First Secretary in 1916.

In 1920 he was promoted to Counsellor and appointed to Tehran, but did not proceed; instead, he worked at the Foreign Office until 1924 when he did go briefly to Tehran before being posted to Rome, also briefly, before he was appointed Minister to Mexico when diplomatic relations were resumed in 1925 (having been broken off in 1914).

In August 1929 Ovey was appointed Minister to Brazil, but he did not proceed there and instead was appointed, in November of that year, to be the first British Ambassador to the Soviet Union. The United Kingdom had recognised the Soviet Union in 1924, and Sir Robert Hodgson had been posted there as chargé d'affaires, but the British diplomatic mission had been withdrawn in 1927. Simultaneously a Soviet ambassador to the U.K. was appointed; Grigori Sokolnikov arrived in London on the same day as Ovey arrived in Moscow, 13 December 1929.

Relations between the U.K. and the Soviet Union were uneasy and Ovey had to deal with several controversies. On the lighter side, however, Ovey related that when he was invited to a banquet by Soviet Foreign Commissar Maxim Litvinov, he observed that his fork – and all the knives, forks and spoons on the table – bore the British coat of arms, having been stolen during the Russian Revolution from the then British Embassy. Ovey made no protest.

However, a serious crisis arose in March 1933 when six engineers of Metropolitan-Vickers were arrested in Moscow and tried for espionage and "wrecking" because some turbines built by the company were faulty. Ovey had a stormy interview with Litvinov in which he "observed a strong but correct attitude. His efforts were, on the whole, successful." One of the men was acquitted, three deported and two imprisoned but released after two months. Meanwhile, Ovey had been recalled to London to report and never returned to Russia.

Ovey was appointed ambassador to Belgium in April 1934 and transferred to be ambassador to Argentina (and minister to Paraguay), his final appointment, in 1937. He retired in 1942.

== Honours ==
Esmond Ovey was appointed MVO in 1907, a Commander of the Order of St Michael and St George (CMG) in 1917, promoted to Knight Commander of the Order (KCMG) in the 1929 Birthday Honours and further promoted to Knight Grand Cross of the Order (GCMG) in the 1941 Birthday Honours.

The King of Belgium gave him the Grand Cross of the Order of Leopold.

== Personal life ==
In May 1909, in Washington, Esmond Ovey married Blanche, daughter of Rear-Admiral William H. Emory, United States Navy. She died in 1924. In 1930, in Paris, he married Marie-Armande, daughter of George René Vignat, of Paris, and widow of Señor Don Benjamin Barrios, of Mexico. She died in 1954.

In 1933, Sir Esmond and Lady Ovey took a long lease of Culham Manor, near Abingdon, Oxfordshire. They restored the house over several years and lived there until his death in 1963.

== Offices held ==
Diplomatic posts
Preceded by no ambassador since 1914	Envoy Extraordinary and Minister Plenipotentiary at Mexico City; 1925–1929	Succeeded by Edmund Monson
Preceded by no ambassador since 1917	Ambassador Extraordinary and Plenipotentiary to the Union of Soviet Socialist Republics; 1930–1934	Succeeded by Aretas Akers-Douglas, 2nd Viscount Chilston
Preceded by Sir George Clerk	Ambassador Extraordinary and Plenipotentiary to His Majesty the King of the Belgians, and also Envoy Extraordinary and Minister Plenipotentiary to Her Royal Highness the Grand Duchess of Luxemburg; 1934–1937	Succeeded by Sir Robert Clive
Preceded by Sir Nevile Henderson	Ambassador Extraordinary and Plenipotentiary at Buenos Aires and Minister at Asunción; 1937–1942	Succeeded by Sir David Kelly

== References and sources ==
Sources

- OVEY, Sir Esmond, Who Was Who, A & C Black, 1920–2008; online edn, Oxford University Press, Dec 2007, retrieved 4 September 2012
- Obituary – Sir Esmond Ovey – A Wide Diplomatic Career (with photo), The Times, London, 31 May 1963, page 16
