= Duncan Taylor (diplomat) =

British diplomat

Duncan Taylor CBE
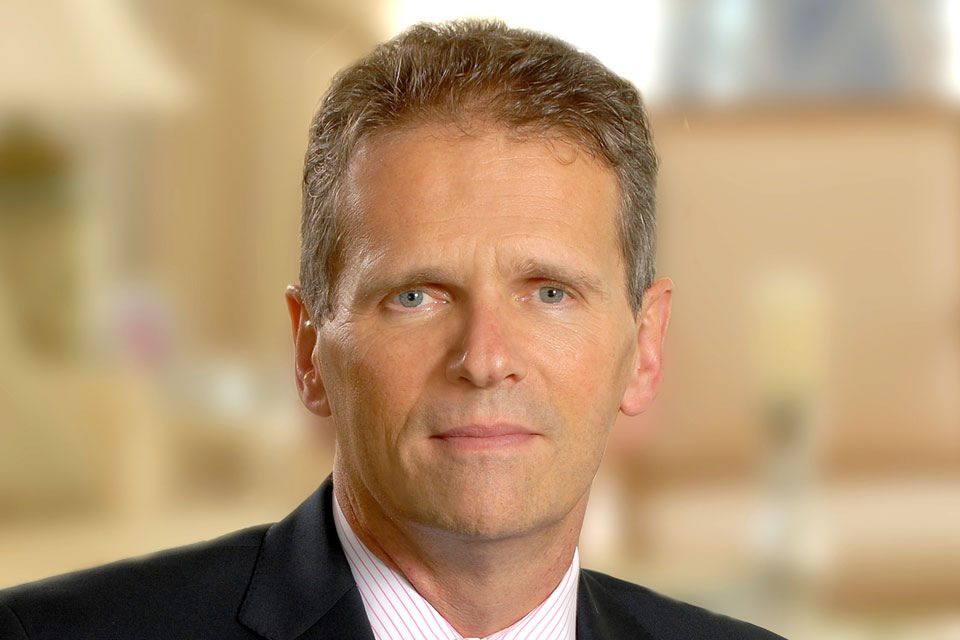

British Ambassador to Mexico
- In office 2013–2018
- Monarch: Elizabeth II
- Prime Minister: David Cameron; Theresa May
- Preceded by: Judith Macgregor
- Succeeded by: Corin Robertson

Governor of the Cayman Islands
- In office 2010–2013
- Monarch: Elizabeth II
- Preceded by: Stuart Jack
- Succeeded by: Helen Kilpatrick

Personal details
- Born: 17 October 1958 (age 67)
- Spouse: Marie-Beatrice
- Children: 5
- Parent: Sir Jock Taylor (father)
- Education: Trinity College, Cambridge

Duncan John Rushworth Taylor CBE (born 17 October 1958) is a British retired diplomat whose most recent post was British Ambassador to Mexico.

== Career ==
Educated at Highgate School and Trinity College, Cambridge, he joined the United Kingdom Foreign and Commonwealth Office (FCO) in 1982 as a Desk Officer in its West Africa department. In 2005, he was appointed the British High Commissioner for Barbados and the Eastern Caribbean, which covered Antigua and Barbuda, the Commonwealth of Dominica, Grenada, Saint Kitts and Nevis, Saint Lucia, and Saint Vincent and the Grenadines. He became the governor of the Cayman Islands on 15 January 2010. His appointment as ambassador to Mexico was announced in May 2013. In April 2018 the FCO announced that he was to be replaced in October 2018 and was retiring from the Diplomatic Service.

== Personal life ==
Duncan Taylor is the son of Sir Jock Taylor, also a diplomat, and the grandson of Sir John Taylor (1895–1974), who was also ambassador to Mexico. He is married to Marie-Beatrice and has three daughters and two sons.

Diplomatic posts
Preceded by John White	British High Commissioner to Barbados and the Eastern Caribbean; 2005–2009	Succeeded by Paul Brummell
Government offices
Preceded by Stuart Jack	Governor of the Cayman Islands; 2010–2013	Succeeded by Helen Kilpatrick
Diplomatic posts
Preceded by Judith Macgregor	British Ambassador to Mexico; 2013–2018	Succeeded by Corin Robertson
