= Trevor Brewer =

Wales international rugby union player

- Born: Trevor James Brewer; 16 August 1930 Newport, Wales
- Died: 15 July 2018 (aged 87) Reading, England
- School: Newport High School
- University: Jesus College, Oxford

Rugby union career
- Position: Wing
Amateur team(s)
Years	Team	Apps	(Points)
- Oxford University RFC
–	Newport RFC		
–	London Welsh RFC		
–	Gloucester RFC		
–	The Army		
–	Combined Services		
–	Hampshire		
International career
Years	Team	Apps	(Points)
1950–1955	Wales	3	(6)

Trevor James Brewer (16 August 1930 – 15 July 2018) was a Welsh rugby union international player. He played for the Wales national rugby union team on three occasions, once in 1950 and twice in 1955.

== Life and rugby career ==
Brewer, who was born in Newport, Wales and was educated at Newport High School, representing the school rugby team. He then represented his country at schoolboy level playing for the Welsh Secondary Schools team. He matriculated to Jesus College, Oxford where he studied chemistry. He was called into the Wales national rugby union team for the match against England in January 1950 whilst still a student at Oxford, and before he had won his "Blue" (as he had missed the Varsity Match that year through injury). He played on the wing. Brewer did not play for Wales again until the 1954/1955 season, when he played in the matches against England and Scotland national rugby union team, scoring two tries against Scotland. He also played rugby for the Army, Newport RFC, London Welsh RFC (captaining the side) and the Welsh Academicals.

He later worked for ICI and lived in Northern Ireland. He was the father of Nicola Brewer, former British High Commissioner to South Africa and former chief executive of the Commission for Equality and Human Rights.

He died on 15 July 2018 at the age of 87.
