= Jock Taylor (diplomat) =

British diplomat

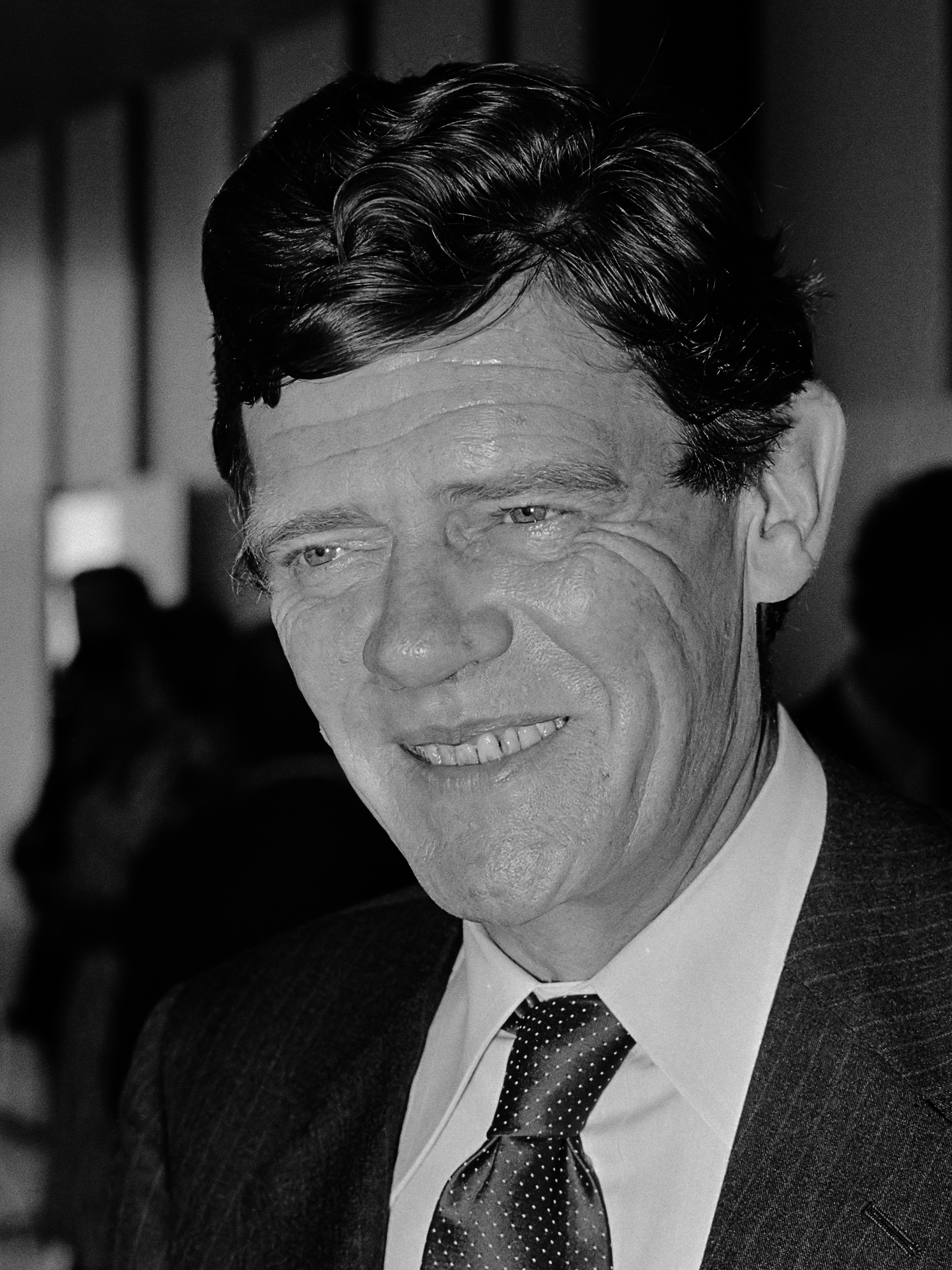
John Lang Taylor (1979)

Sir John Lang "Jock" Taylor KCMG (3 August 1924 – 30 September 2002) was a British diplomat. He was British ambassador to Venezuela (1975–79), the Netherlands (1979–81), and West Germany (1981–84).

He was the son of Sir John William Taylor KBE CMG. His own son is the diplomat Duncan Taylor.

Taylor was appointed a Companion of the Order of Saint Michael and Saint George (CMG) in the 1974 Birthday Honours, and promoted to Knight Commander of the Order (KCMG) in the 1979 Birthday Honours.
