= Té Bheag =

Brand of Scotch whisky

Coordinates: 57°8′44″N 5°47′58″W

Tè Bheag
- Type: Scotch Whisky
- Manufacturer: Pràban na Linne Ltd
- Origin: Scotland
- Alcohol by volume: 40%
- Website: Té Bheag

Tè Bheag (Scottish Gaelic pronunciation: [ˈtʲʰeː ˈvek]) is a blended Scotch whisky made by Pràban na Linne Ltd in Scotland. It is one of Sir Iain Noble's Gaelic Whisky range, which has its headquarters at Eilean Iarmain on the Isle of Skye.

== See also ==
- List of whisky brands
- List of distilleries in Scotland
