= List of ambassadors of the United Kingdom to Mexico =

UK Ambassador to Mexico
- Royal arms of His Majesty's Government

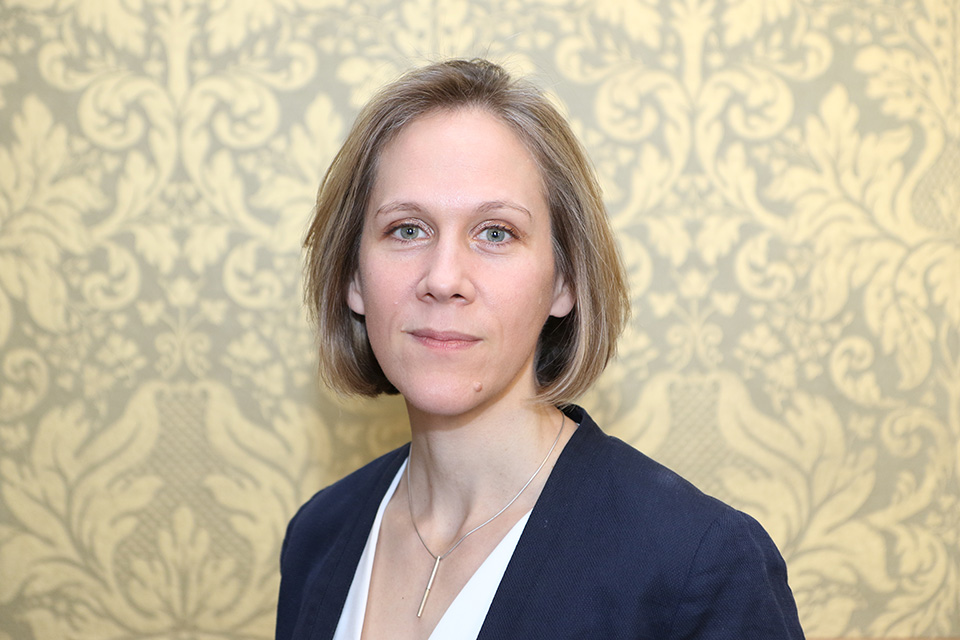
- Incumbent; Susannah Goshko since November 2024
- Style: His/Her Excellency
- Reports to: Foreign Secretary
- Residence: Mexico City
- Appointer: Monarch
- Term length: No term fixed
- Inaugural holder: Richard Pakenham; Minister Plenipotentiary
- Formation: 1835; Envoy Extraordinary and Minister Plenipotentiary
- Website: UK and Mexico

The ambassador of the United Kingdom to Mexico is the United Kingdom's foremost diplomatic representative in the United Mexican States, and head of the UK's diplomatic mission in Mexico.

Besides the embassy in Mexico City, the UK also maintains a consulate general in Cancún.

== Heads of mission ==
=== Envoys extraordinary and ministers plenipotentiary ===
==== Republic of Mexico ====
- 1835–1843: Richard Pakenham, Minister Plenipotentiary
  - 1843: Percy William Doyle, Chargé d'Affaires
- 1843–1847: Charles Bankhead, Minister Plenipotentiary
  - 1847–1850: Percy William Doyle, Chargé d'Affaires
  - 1850–1851: Charles Bankhead, Chargé d'Affaires
- 1851–1858: Percy William Doyle
- 1858–1860: Loftus Charles Otway
- 1860–1864: Charles Lennox Wyke

==== Emperor of Mexico ====
- 1864–1867: Peter Campbell Scarlett

==== Mexico ====
- 1867–1884: No diplomatic relations following French intervention in Mexico
- 1884–1893: Sir Spenser St. John previously on special mission there
- 1893–1894: Hon. Power Henry Le Poer Trench
- 1894–1900: Sir Henry Dering
- 1900–1906: George Greville
- 1906–1911: Reginald Tower
- 1911–1913: Sir Francis Stronge
- 1913–1914: Sir Lionel Carden
- 1914–1925: Diplomatic relations broken during Mexican Revolution
- 1925–1929: Sir Esmond Ovey
- 1929–1934: Edmund Monson
- 1935–1937: John Murray
- 1937–1938: Owen O'Malley
- 1938–1941: Diplomatic relations broken due to Mexican oil expropriation
- 1941–1944: Charles Bateman

=== Ambassadors extraordinary and plenipotentiary to Mexico ===
- 1944–1947: Charles Bateman
- 1947–1950: Sir Thomas Rapp
- 1950–1954: Sir John Taylor
- 1954–1956: Sir William Sullivan
- 1956–1960: Sir Andrew Noble
- 1960–1964: Sir Peter Garran
- 1964–1968: Sir Nicolas Cheetham
- 1968–1972: Sir Peter Hope
- 1972–1977: Sir John Galsworthy
- 1977–1981: Norman Ernest Cox
- 1981–1983: Sir Crispin Tickell
- 1983–1986: Sir Kenneth James
- 1986–1989: Sir John Morgan
- 1989–1992: Sir Michael Simpson-Orlebar
- 1992–1994: Sir Roger Hervey
- 1994–1998: Sir Adrian Beamish
- 1999–2002: Adrian Thorpe
- 2002–2005: Denise Holt
- 2005–2009: Giles Paxman
- 2009–2013: Judith Macgregor
- 2013–2018: Duncan Taylor
- 2018–2021: Corin Robertson
- 2021–2024:Jon Benjamin
- 2024–present: Susannah Goshko
