= Muntz baronets =

Extinct baronetcy in the Baronetage of the United Kingdom

The Muntz Baronetcy, of Dunsmore near Rugby in the Parish of Clifton-upon-Dunsmore in the County of Warwick, was a title in the Baronetage of the United Kingdom. It was created on 24 July 1902 for Philip Muntz, Member of Parliament for Warwickshire North and Tamworth. He was the son of the industrialist and Liberal politician George Frederic Muntz, of Umberslade Hall, Warwickshire. The title became extinct on the death in 1940 of the third Baronet, a naval lieutenant, who was lost at sea with his submarine HMS Regulus (N88) during the Second World War.

The family seat was Umberslade Hall, Tanworth-in-Arden, Warwickshire.

== Muntz baronets, of Dunsmore (1902) ==
- Sir Philip Albert Muntz, 1st Baronet (1839–1908)
- Sir Gerard Albert Muntz, 2nd Baronet (1864–1927)
- Sir Gerard Philip Graves Muntz (1917–1940)

Coat of arms of Muntz baronets
Crest In front of a demi-swan wings expanded Argent semee of trefoils slipped Vert a staff raguly fesswise Or. Escutcheon Pean on a mount in base Proper a swan rising Argent charged on each wing with a trefoil slipped Vert in chief a staff raguly erect between two estoiles Or. Motto Basis Virtutum Constantia (Steadiness Is The Foundation of the Virtues)

Baronetage of the United Kingdom
Preceded by McLaren baronets	Muntz baronets of Dunsmore; 24 July 1902	Succeeded by Noble baronets
