= Iain Noble =

British businessman, Scottish Gaelic language activist (1935–2010)

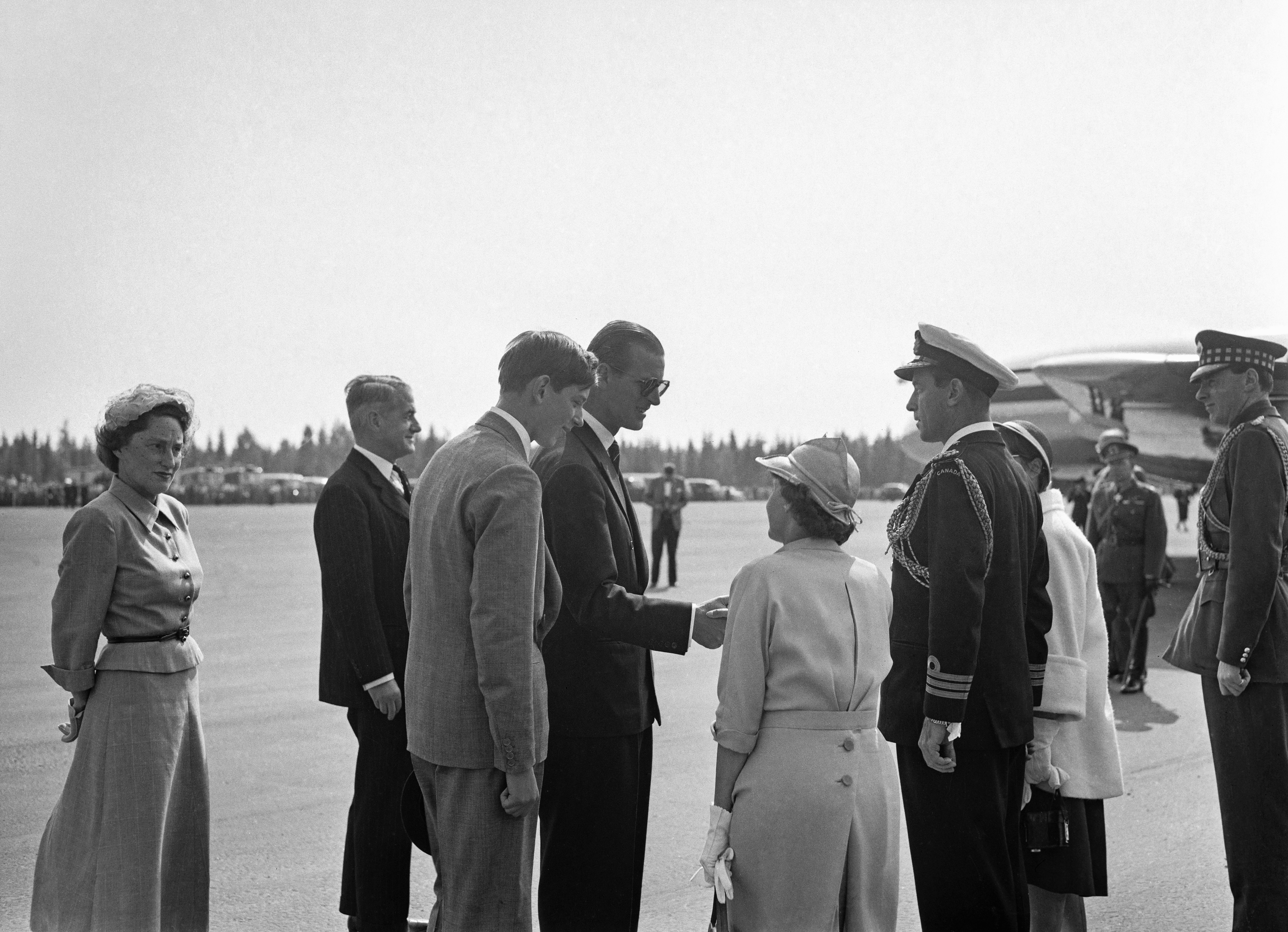
Sir Andrew Noble in 1952

Sir Iain Andrew Noble, 3rd Baronet, OBE (8 September 1935 – 25 December 2010) was a businessman, landowner on the Isle of Skye and a noted Scottish Gaelic language activist.

== Early life ==
Noble was born in Berlin in 1935, the son of Sir Andrew Napier Noble, a British diplomat, and a Norwegian mother. He received his primary education in Shanghai, Argentina, and at Summer Fields, Oxford, before attending Eton and University College, Oxford. He was the nephew of the Conservative MP Michael Noble and a great-grandson of Sir Andrew Noble, 1st Baronet. The Nobles have been landowners in Dunbartonshire and Argyllshire since the 15th century, often with careers in the military or in business.

== Career ==
Noble began his own career by establishing a merchant bank, Noble Grossart, in Edinburgh in 1969. When he was bought out, he used the proceeds to buy part of the MacDonald Estates on Skye. This included 20,000 acres of land, most of which was on the Sleat peninsula. Noble subsequently developed many business interests on Skye and elsewhere, including Hotel Eilean Iarmain and the whisky company Pràban na Linne which produces a vatted malt whisky called Poit Dhubh (literally the "Black Pot" or "Illicit Still". The company also produces two blends, Té Bheag nan Eilean ("small dram of the islands") and Mac na Mara (the "Son of the Sea").

Although not a native Gaelic speaker Noble became an enthusiastic learner of the language and used his position as landowner to support the language, introducing an employment policy of positive discrimination in favour of Gaelic speakers. He was directly responsible for the erection of the first Gaelic road signs in Scotland, and the holder of the first ever Gaelic cheque book, issued for him by the Bank of Scotland.

Noble was the original founder of the Gaelic medium college Sabhal Mòr Ostaig which is located in Sleat, Skye. The original "Large Hall" (the Talla Mhòr) was part of the MacDonald estates.

Noble married Lucilla Mackenzie in 1990. He died at home on Skye on 25 December 2010, and was succeeded in the baronetcy by his brother, Timothy Peter Noble.

== Awards and honours ==
He received an Order of the British Empire (OBE) in the 1998 Birthday Honours for services to Gaelic language and culture.

== See also ==
- Noble baronets

== Sources ==
- Roger Hutchinson, A Waxing Moon: The Modern Gaelic Revival, Mainstream Publishing, Edinburgh, 2005. ISBN 1-84018-794-8.

Baronetage of the United Kingdom
Preceded by Andrew Noble	Baronet (of Ardkinglas and Eilean Iarmain); 1987–2010	Succeeded by Timothy Noble
