= Nicola Brewer =

British diplomat and academic administrator

Dame Nicola Brewer DCMG
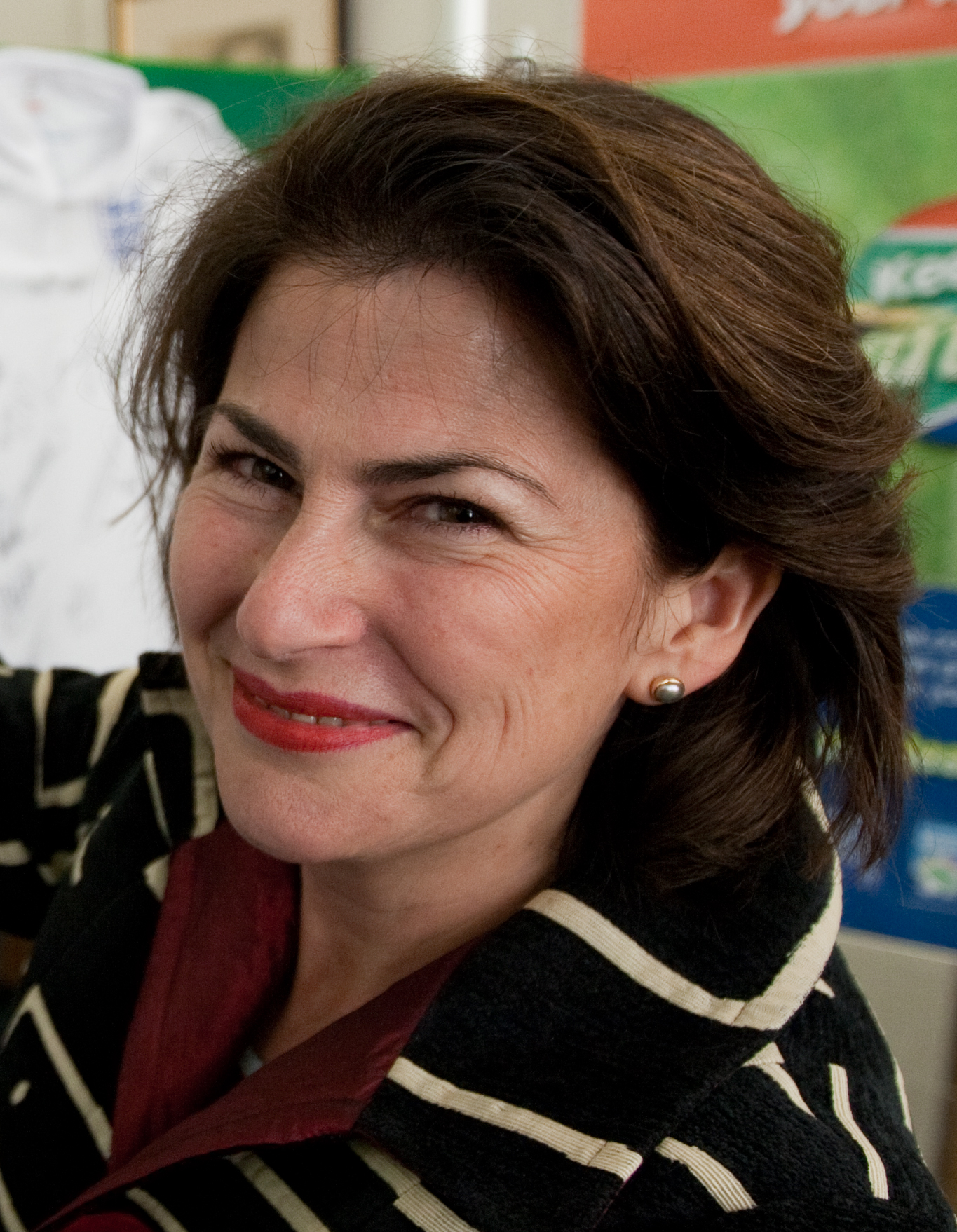

British High Commissioner to the Republic of South Africa
- In office May 2009 – Sept 2013
- Preceded by: Paul Boateng
- Succeeded by: Judith Macgregor

Chief Executive, Equality and Human Rights Commission
- In office March 2007 – May 2009
- Preceded by: New position
- Succeeded by: Neil Kinghan (interim)

Personal details
- Parent: Trevor Brewer (father)
- Education: University of Leeds

Dame Nicola Mary Brewer DCMG (born 14 November 1957) is a former British diplomat and university administrator. From 2014 to 2020, she was Vice-Provost (International) at University College London, she was British High Commissioner to South Africa from 2009 to 2013, and the first Chief Executive of Britain's Equality and Human Rights Commission from 2007 to 2009.

== Education ==
Brewer was educated at the Belfast Royal Academy, and read English at the University of Leeds, graduating with a Bachelor of Arts in 1980, then taking a Doctorate in linguistics in 1988 there.

== Career ==
Brewer joined the Foreign and Commonwealth Office (FCO) in 1983, completing overseas postings in South Africa, India, France and Mexico. She served as the FCO's Director for Global Issues from 2001 to 2002, and then as Director-General for Regional Programmes at the Department for International Development (DfID), the DfID board member supervising the UK's overseas bilateral aid programmes.

In December 2006, Brewer was appointed by open competition as the first Chief Executive of the newly established Equality and Human Rights Commission, the successor body to the Commission for Racial Equality, the Disability Rights Commission and the Equal Opportunities Commission.

In May 2014, she was appointed Vice-Provost (International) at University College London, standing down in 2020.

== Other activities ==
- Iberdrola, Independent Member of the Board of Directors (since 2020)
- Weir Group, Independent Member of the Board of Directors (since 2022)

Brewer is also a member of the Trilateral Commission. From 2021 to 2022, she was a member of the Trilateral Commission’s Task Force on Global Capitalism in Transition, chaired by Carl Bildt, Kelly Grier and Takeshi Niinami.

== Recognition ==
Brewer was appointed Companion of the Order of St Michael and St George (CMG) in the 2003 New Year Honours and Dame Commander of the Order of St Michael and St George (DCMG) in the 2011 Birthday Honours. The University of Leeds awarded her an honorary Doctorate of Laws in 2009. She was appointed Chevalier, Légion d'honneur in 2022.

== Personal life ==
Brewer is married to former diplomat Geoffrey Gillham; they have two children. Her father, Trevor Brewer, played international rugby for Wales in the 1950s.

Government offices
Preceded by Suma Chakrabarti	Director-General, Regional Programmes of the Department for International Development; 2002–2004	Succeeded by Dame Nemat Shafik
Preceded by Sir Kim Darroch	Director-General, Europe of the Foreign and Commonwealth Office; 2004–2007	Succeeded by Martin Donnelly as Director-General, Europe and Globalisation
Preceded by New position	Chief Executive of the Equality and Human Rights Commission; 2007–2009	Succeeded by Neil Kinghan (interim)
Diplomatic posts
Preceded by Paul Boateng	High Commissioner to South Africa; 2009–2013	Succeeded by Judith Macgregor
