= Aretas Akers-Douglas, 2nd Viscount Chilston =

British diplomat (1876–1947)

The Right Honourable The Viscount Chilston GCMG PC
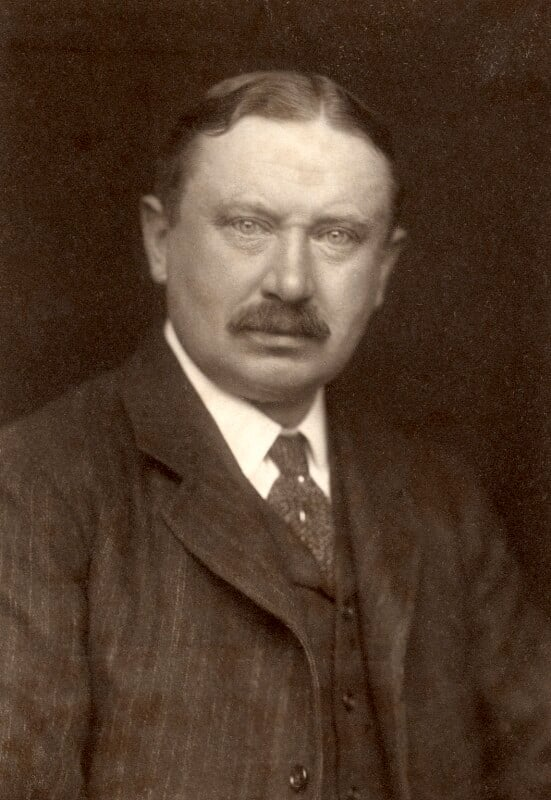

Ambassador to the Soviet Union
- In office 1933–1938
- Monarchs: George V Edward VIII; George VI
- Preceded by: Sir Esmond Ovey
- Succeeded by: Sir William Seeds

Personal details
- Born: 17 February 1876 London, England
- Died: 25 July 1947 (aged 71)
- Spouse(s): Amy Jennings-Bramly (d. 1962)

Aretas Akers-Douglas, 2nd Viscount Chilston, GCMG, PC (17 February 1876 – 25 July 1947), was a British diplomat. He was Ambassador to the Soviet Union between 1933 and 1938.

== Background and education ==
Chilston was born in London, the son of Aretas Akers-Douglas, 1st Viscount Chilston, and Adeline Mary, daughter of Horatio Austen-Smith. He was educated at Eton.

== Diplomatic career ==
Akers-Douglas entered the Diplomatic Service in 1898, and was appointed a Third Secretary in December 1900. He was an officer in the 3rd (Militia) Battalion of The Royal Scots (Lothian Regiment), where he was appointed captain on 15 April 1899. He was seconded for service in Egypt on 14 March 1900.

He held minor positions before being appointed Ambassador to Austria in 1921, a post he held until 1928. He then served as Ambassador to Hungary between 1928 and 1933 and as Ambassador to the Soviet Union between 1933 and 1938. He was appointed a CMG in 1918, a KCMG in 1927 and a GCMG in 1935 and was sworn of the Privy Council in 1939.

== Family ==
Lord Chilston married Amy, daughter of Major John Robert Jennings-Bramly, in 1903. They had two sons, of whom the eldest, the Hon. Aretas, was killed in a motor accident in 1940. Lord Chilston died in July 1947, aged 71, and was succeeded in the viscountcy by his second and only surviving son, Eric. Lady Chilston died in August 1962.

Diplomatic posts
Preceded by Sir Francis Lindley	Ambassador to Austria; 1921–1928	Succeeded by Sir Eric Phipps
Preceded by Sir Colville Barclay	Ambassador to Hungary; 1928–1933	Succeeded by Hon. Sir Patrick Ramsay
Preceded by Sir Esmond Ovey	Ambassador to the Soviet Union; 1933–1938	Succeeded by Sir William Seeds
Peerage of the United Kingdom
Preceded by Aretas Akers-Douglas	Viscount Chilston; 1926–1947	Succeeded by Eric Alexander Akers-Douglas
