= William Seeds =

British diplomat (1882–1973)

Sir William Seeds KCMG
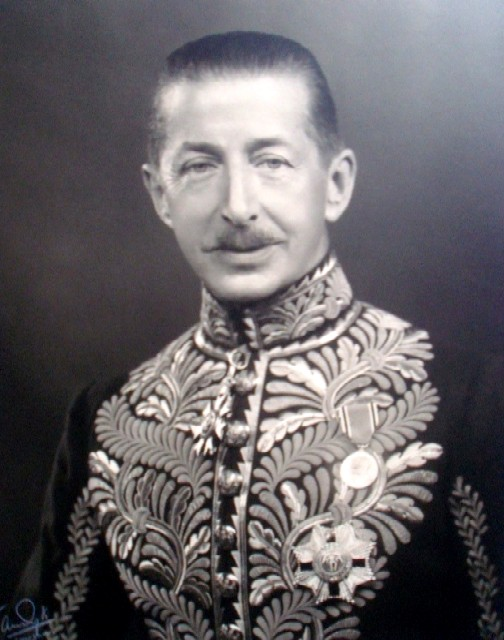
- Seeds in 1939

Ambassador to the Soviet Union
- In office 1939–1940
- Monarch: George VI
- Preceded by: Viscount Chilston
- Succeeded by: Sir Stafford Cripps

Personal details
- Born: 27 June 1882 Dublin
- Died: 2 November 1973 (aged 91) London
- Spouse(s): Arabella, Lady Seeds (d.1979)
- Education: Rugby School

Sir William Seeds KCMG (27 June 1882 – 2 November 1973) was a British diplomat who served as ambassador to both the Soviet Union and Brazil.

== Background and education ==
Seeds was born in Dublin, Ireland, on 27 June 1882, to an Ulster Protestant family. He was the only son of Robert Seeds (1835-1892), of Rutland Square, Dublin, QC, the Queen's Advocate General, and Ada Charlotte, daughter of John Le Mottée, of Le Vanquiédou, a Jurat of Guernsey. After the death of Robert Seeds, his widow married in 1900 Sir William Squire Barker Kaye, CB, KC, Assistant Under-Secretary for Ireland.

Seeds was educated at Rugby School and was proficient in French, German, Spanish, Portuguese and Russian. In his late teens he spent two years (1899–1901) in the Russian Empire as a student living with several Russian families, studying the culture and language. He grew to love "the real old Russia like a story or play by Chekhov" On his return from Russia he studied in London to enter the diplomatic service whilst fully enjoying the many entertainments that Edwardian London nightlife had to offer.

== Diplomatic career ==
Seeds entered His Majesty's Diplomatic Service in 1904 and served in Washington D.C., United States, (1904–07), at the British Legation at Peking, China, (1908–10) and at the British Legation in Athens, Greece (1911–13). He was Chargé d'Affaires and British Consulate General in Lisbon, Portugal, (1913–1919) and Chargé d'Affaires and First Secretary in Berlin, Germany, in 1919. He was appointed Consul General for Bavaria in November 1920 and transferred to Munich. In January 1922, having attended a rally at the Bürgerbräukeller, Seeds wrote one of the first British official reports on the Nazi Party in which he described Adolf Hitler as “a rabid Nationalist and anti-Semite”. In November 1922 Seeds warned: "Herr Hitler has developed into something much more than a scurrilous and rather comic agitator." Seeds was Envoy Extraordinary and Minister Plenipotentiary to the Republic of Colombia in Bogotá from 1923 to 1925 and Envoy Extraordinary and Minister Plenipotentiary to the United States of Venezuela in Caracas from 1925 to 1926. In 1926–28 he was Envoy Extraordinary and Minister Plenipotentiary and Consul General to the Albanian Republic under the rule of Zog I of Albania whom Seeds reported "is not the pallid tyrant trembling in his palace that some expect him to be".

In 1928 Seeds became British High Commissioner for the Rhineland in Koblenz, and during his tenure of the post, he was mainly occupied in the arrangements for the evacuation. In the article “Lone Seeds”, Time (magazine) wrote, “Left behind was a lone Briton, one William Seeds, Inter-Allied Rhineland High Commissioner since 1928, who must represent the dignity and power of the British Empire in Germany” In 1930 Seeds was appointed a Knight Commander of the Order of St Michael and St George (KCMG) by George V. Sir William served as Ambassador to Brazil (1930–35). Seeds' final and most controversial diplomatic post before retirement was as Ambassador to the Soviet Union (1939–40). During this time he tried to negotiate with Soviet Foreign Minister Vyacheslav Molotov to form a collective security pact between the United Kingdom and the Soviet Union in the months before World War II, which ended when the Soviet Union instead signed the Molotov–Ribbentrop Pact with Nazi Germany.

== Family ==
On 17 November 1911, Seeds married Arabella Agnes Muriel (1883–1979), daughter of Theobald Butler, a descendant of James Butler, 2nd/ 12th Baron Dunboyne. They had three sons and one daughter. Their eldest son, Robert Seeds(1914–1991), a Major in the Intelligence Corps (United Kingdom) who lost his left hand in 1941 whilst detonating a bomb for the Special Operations Executive, was a university professor and journalist working in and for Saudi Arabia from 1959 until his death. Their second son Hugh (1917-2010) initially joined the Royal Navy then became a conscientious objector and emigrated to New Zealand after the war. The youngest son, James (1919-1940), served as a Pilot Officer in the Royal Air Force, and was killed in action at the age of 20.

Their daughter Sheila (1912-2005), worked at MI5 headquarters in HMP Wormwood Scrubs during the war years. She married first, in 1934 (divorcing in 1949), Sir John Fisher Wentworth Dilke, 5th Baronet, and had two sons, who each succeeded to the baronetcy. Her elder son, Charles, was a Catholic priest at the Brompton Oratory, and died unmarried and without issue. Charles' brother, Dr.Timothy Dilke, a consultant rheumatologist, is expected to succeed him as the 7th Baronet.

== Death and legacy ==
Seeds died peacefully in his home in St. John's Wood, London at the age of 91 on 2 November 1973 and was buried in the Seeds family graveyard in Derriaghy, Lisburn, Northern Ireland. There is a memorial to Seeds and his wife at Lymington Church, Hampshire, where they were regular worshippers.

A collector of Chinese and Russian artworks, he bequeathed a Carl Fabergé gold, enamel and diamond presentation box to the Victoria and Albert Museum where it is on display (room 91, case 56,) to whom he had also intended to bequeath his collection of 10 Fabergé hardstone figurines who he referred to as “my little men” in his diaries and conversations.

Seeds' extensive papers, diaries and photographs are kept by his granddaughter, Corinna Seeds, on Hydra (island) in Greece, and can be viewed and referenced on request.

== Arms ==
Coat of arms of William Seeds
Notes Granted 20 January 1928 by Sir Nevile Rodwell Wilkinson, Ulster King of Arms. Crest On a wreath of the colours a hand erect holding six ears of wheat and charged at the wrist with a plate Proper. Escutcheon Ermine two pales Azure charged with six plates on a chief Argent three roses Gules. Motto Pax Et Copia
