= Giles Paxman =

British diplomat (1951–2025)

His Excellency Giles Paxman CMG LVO
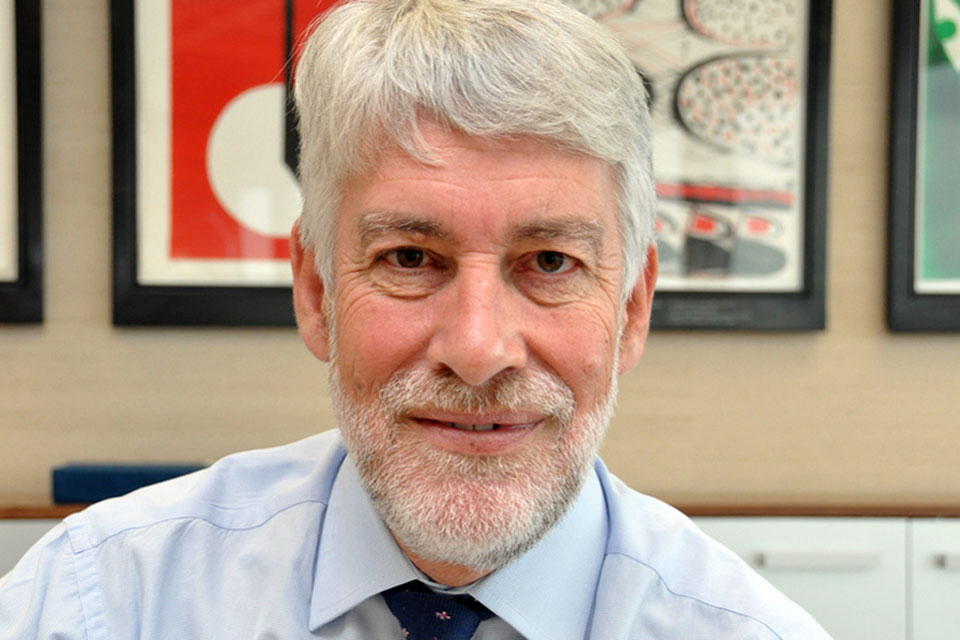
- Paxman in 2013

Her Majesty's Ambassador to Spain
- In office 2009–2013
- Monarch: Elizabeth II
- Prime Minister: Gordon Brown; David Cameron
- Preceded by: Denise Holt
- Succeeded by: Simon Manley

Her Majesty's Ambassador to Mexico
- In office 2005–2009
- Monarch: Elizabeth II
- Prime Minister: Tony Blair; Gordon Brown
- Preceded by: Denise Holt

Personal details
- Born: Timothy Giles Paxman; 15 November 1951 Gosport, Hampshire, England
- Died: 8 March 2025 (aged 73)
- Spouse: Ségolène Cayol
- Children: 3
- Relatives: Jeremy Paxman (brother)
- Education: Malvern College; New College, Oxford; ENA
- Occupation: Diplomat

Timothy Giles Paxman CMG LVO (15 November 1951 – 8 March 2025) was a British diplomat who served as Ambassador to Mexico between 2005 and 2009 and Ambassador to Spain between 2009 and 2013.

== Career ==
Paxman became Ambassador to Spain on 19 October 2009. He was appointed Companion of the Order of St Michael and St George (CMG) in the 2013 New Year Honours "for services to UK interests in Spain and Mexico". He was replaced by Simon Manley in October 2013.

== Personal life and death ==
Paxman was married to Ségolène Cayol, with whom he had three daughters. He was a Lieutenant of the Royal Victorian Order. He was the younger brother of broadcaster Jeremy Paxman.

Paxman died from lung cancer on 8 March 2025, at the age of 73.

== Sources ==
- PAXMAN, (Timothy) Giles, Who's Who 2013, A & C Black, 2013; online edn, Oxford University Press, Dec 2012
- HE Mr Giles Paxman, CMG, LVO Authorised Biography – Debrett’s People of Today
