= Sir Edmund Monson, 3rd Baronet =

British diplomat (1883–1969)

Sir Edmund St John Debonnaire John Monson, 3rd Baronet, KCMG (9 September 1883 – 16 April 1969), was a British diplomat who was ambassador to several countries.

== Career ==
Monson was the second son of Sir Edmund Monson, 1st Baronet, and succeeded his elder brother to the baronetcy created in 1905 for his father (also a diplomat). He was educated at Eton College

He entered the British diplomatic service in 1906 and served in junior capacities in Constantinople, Tokyo, Paris and Tehran. During this time he rose through the ranks, being promoted to Third Secretary in 1908, a Second Secretary in 1914, and First Secretary in 1919.He was appointed Acting Counsellor of Embassy in 1922, and promoted to substantive Counsellor grade in 1923. In 1926, he was appointed Minister to Colombia. This was followed by the same post in Mexico from 1929 to 1934, and to the Baltic states from 1934 to 1937. He was Minister to Sweden from 1938 to 1939. He was appointed a Knight Commander of the Order of St Michael and St George (KCMG) in the 1938 New Year Honours on his appointment to Sweden, two years after succeeding his brother to the baronetcy.

== Footnotes ==
Diplomatic posts
Preceded by William Seeds	Envoy Extraordinary and Minister Plenipotentiary to the Republic of Colombia; 1926–1929	Succeeded by Spencer Dickson
Preceded by Sir Esmond Ovey	Envoy Extraordinary and Minister Plenipotentiary to the United States of Mexico; 1929–1934	Succeeded by John Murray
Preceded by Hughe Knatchbull-Hugessen	Envoy Extraordinary and Minister Plenipotentiary at Riga, Tallinn and Kovno; 1935–1937	Succeeded by Sir Charles Orde
Preceded by Michael Palairet	Envoy Extraordinary and Minister Plenipotentiary at Stockholm; 1938–1939	Succeeded by Victor Mallet
Baronetage of the United Kingdom
Preceded by Maxwell Monson	Baronet (of Thatched Park); 1936–1969	Succeeded by George Monson
