= Thomas Rapp (diplomat) =

British diplomat (1893–1984)

Sir Thomas Cecil Rapp KBE CMG MC

British Ambassador to Mexico
- In office 1947–1950
- Preceded by: Charles Bateman
- Succeeded by: Sir John Taylor

Personal details
- Born: 1893
- Died: 22 December 1984 (aged 91)
- Children: 2
- Education: Sidney Sussex College, Cambridge
- Occupation: Diplomat

Sir Thomas Cecil Rapp (1893 – 22 December 1984) was a British diplomat who was Ambassador to Mexico from 1947 to 1950.

== Early life and education ==
Rapp was born in 1893 in Saltburn-by-the-Sea, the son of T.W.Rapp. He was educated at Coatham School and Sidney Sussex College, Cambridge where he was an Arabic scholar.

== Career ==
After serving during World War I with the Duke of Wellington’s Regiment, Rapp retired with rank of Major, and in 1916 received the Military Cross.

Rapp entered the Consular Service in 1919, and began his career as an assistant in the Levant Consular Service. He then served successively as acting vice-consul at Port Said in 1920; vice-consul at Cairo in 1922; vice-consul at Rabat in 1927; consul at Sofia in 1931; consul at Moscow in 1932; consul in Zagreb in 1936, and consul-general at Zagreb from 1939 to 1941. During World War II, he was captured by the German army and imprisoned in Germany from 1941 to 1943. After he was released, he served as consul-general at Tabriz from 1943 to 1944, and at Salonica from 1944 to 1945.

After the War, Rapp was appointed Minister to Albania although the posting did not proceed. In 1946, he served as deputy and then as head of the British Economic Mission to Greece from 1946 to 1947. In 1947, he was appointed Ambassador to Mexico and remained in the post until 1950.

In 1950, Rapp returned to Cairo as head of the influential British Middle East Office having previously served there as consul. Established by Foreign Secretary Ernest Bevin in 1945, it reported on social and political problems in the Middle East and in particular the variety of disputes between the Arab States and Israel. Rapp held the post until 1953 when he retired from the Foreign Service.

In 1965, Rapp was appointed chairman of a committee established by the government to review the operations of the BBC World Service and to make recommendations.

== Personal life and death ==
Rapp married Dorothy Clarke in 1922 and they had two daughters.

Rapp died on 22 December 1984.

== Honours ==
Rapp was appointed Companion of the Order of St Michael and St George (CMG) in the 1945 Birthday Honours. He was appointed Knight Commander of the Order of the British Empire (KBE) in the 1950 Birthday Honours. He was awarded the Military Cross (MC) in 1916.

== See also ==
- Mexico–United Kingdom relations

Diplomatic posts
Preceded by Charles Bateman	British Ambassador to Mexico; 1947–1950	Succeeded by Sir John Taylor
