= Francis Shepherd (diplomat) =

British diplomat

Sir Francis Michie Shepherd, KBE, CMG (6 January 1893 – 15 May 1962) was a British diplomat. He was the British envoy to Finland, Persia, and Poland.

== Biography ==
The son of Francis Shepherd, Shepherd was educated at Oakfield School, University College School and Grenoble University. During the First World War, he served in the Royal Field Artillery in France, Mesopotamia. He also saw service in the Third Anglo-Afghan War. Having been commissioned in the Special Reserve in 1915, he resigned in 1920 with the rank of captain.

He was appointed to the Consular Service in 1920, and served at San Francisco, Buenos Ayres, Lima, Antwerp and Hamburg. He was chargé d’affaires at Port-au-Prince in 1932. in charge of the British Legation at San Salvador in 1934, Minister Resident and Consul to Haiti from 1935 to 1937, Acting Consul-General at Barcelona in March–May 1938, Consul at Dresden in 1938–39; Acting Consul-General at Danzig in July–August 1939. Returning to the United Kingdom on the outbreak of the Second World War, he was employed in the Foreign Office from October 1939 to February 1940, before being appointed Counsellor of Legation and Consul-General at Reykjavik in 1940–42, and at Leopoldville, Belgian Congo, in 1942.

From 1944 to 1947, Shepherd was British Political Representative in Finland, with the rank of Minister. He was British Consul-General for the Netherlands East Indies at Batavia from 1947 to 1949. He was British Ambassador to Persia from 1950 to 1952, and British Ambassador to Poland from 1952 to 1954, when he retired.

In retirement, he married Mrs Barbara Bayntun Fairbairn-Crawford in 1960. His unpublished memoirs are held at the University of Oxford. He died in 1962.

== Honours ==
Shepherd was appointed MBE in 1932, OBE in 1941, CMG in 1946, and KBE in 1948. He was appointed a Grand Officer of the Persian Order of Hamayoun in 1951.
