= Denise Holt =

British ambassador

Dame Denise Mary Holt, DCMG (née Mills; born 1 October 1949, Vienna, Austria) was British Ambassador to Mexico (2002–05) and Spain and Andorra (2007–09).

Previous roles include Ofqual (the examinations regulator in England) from 2010-2013 and the NHS Pay Review Body 2010-2014. She was Chair of Trustees of the Anglo-Spanish Society (2010-2013), a member of the Management Council of the Canada Blanch Centre for Contemporary Spanish Studies at LSE, and Chair of the Institute of Latin American Studies at the University of London. On 20 June 2011, Scottish Power Renewables announced in a press release that they had appointed Holt to their board as a non-executive director until 2020, when she resigned.

Holt grew up in Russia, Japan, Lebanon, Netherlands, Iran and Bulgaria. She was educated at New Hall School, Chelmsford, and Bristol University where she studied Spanish, French and Politics.

She served as First Secretary of the British Embassy in Brazil (1991–1993). She was deputy head of Eastern Department, responsible for relations with newly independent countries of Central Asia and the Trans Caucasus. In 1996, she was appointed as deputy director of human resources in the FCO (1999–2001) and later director. Later on in her career she also became director for migration and for the Overseas Territories (2005–07) at the FCO.

== Personal life ==
Denise married David Holt in 1987 while they were both serving in the British Embassy in Ireland; the couple has one child.

== Honours ==
From Companion of the Order of St Michael and St George, she was elevated to Dame Commander of that same order (DCMG) in the 2009 Birthday Honours.
