= Free Trade Agreement between Mexico and the European Union =

Cooperation Agreement

- Locations of Mexico and the European Union on the world map
- Type: Multilateral treaty
- Signed: 12 August 1997
- Location: Brussels, Belgium
- Effective: 1 October 2000
- Original signatories: Mexico; European Union

Free Trade Agreement between Mexico and the European Union (FTA EU-MX), is a trade agreement between the European Union and Mexico. It was signed on December 8, 1997, in the city of Brussels, under the designation "Agreement of Economic Partnership, Political Coordination and Cooperation between the United Mexican States and the European Community and its members". On October 1, 2000 the agreement came into force, and taxes applying to a large quantity of importing goods were eliminated or reduced.

The goal of this trade agreement is to establish a framework to encourage the development of trade in goods and services and their bilateral and preferential, progressive and reciprocal, taking into account the sensitivity of certain products and services sectors, and in accordance with relevant WTO rules. The Joint Council is responsible for deciding the arrangements and timetable for the liberalization of duties and non-duties barriers to trade in goods, in accordance with the relevant WTO rules. The decision shall include the following subjects:

- Customs duties on imports and exports and charges having equivalent effect.
- Quantitative restrictions on imports and exports and measures having equivalent effect.
- Anti-dumping/countervailing measurements.
- Safeguards and monitoring measurements.
- Origin regime and customs co-operation.
- Customs valuation.
- Standards and technical regulations, sanitary and phytosanitary legislation, mutual recognition of conformity assessment, certification.
- General exceptions justified on grounds of public morality, public order or public security, protection of life or health of humans, animals or plants, protection of industrial property, intellectual and commercial.
- Restrictions in case of difficulties in the balance of payments.

Mexico and the European Union successfully ended negotiations on an updated trade agreement on 28 April 2020, pending approval by both sides.

== See also ==
- Mexico–European Union relations
- European Union free trade agreements
