= Jon Benjamin (diplomat) =

British diplomat

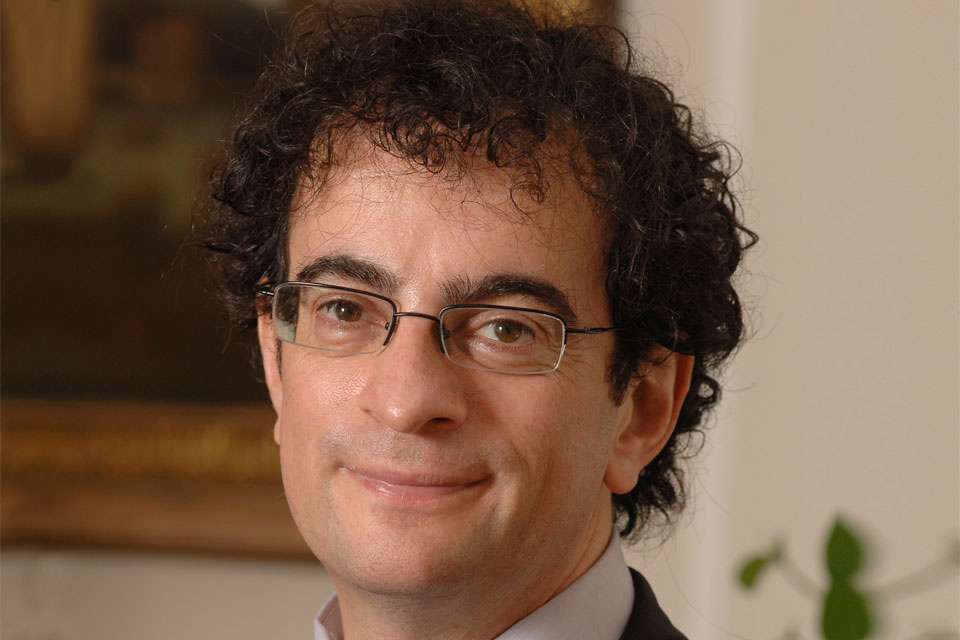
Benjamin while serving as Ambassador to Chile in 2013

Jonathan "Jon" Benjamin (born 19 January 1963) is a former British diplomat. He joined the United Kingdom's diplomatic service in 1986.

He studied German, Swedish and international relations at the University of Surrey.

During his career, he has served as consul general in New York City and has represented UK interests in Indonesia and Turkey. He was Ambassador to Chile in 2009–2014 and High Commissioner to Ghana and ambassador to several neighbouring countries in 2014–2017. He was later the director of the Diplomatic Academy in London. His other roles in the Foreign, Commonwealth and Development Office have included appointments as the Head of the Human Rights Policy Department (2002– 2005), the Deputy Head of the Drugs and International Crime Department (2000–2002) and the Head of the Zimbabwe Emergency Unit (2000).

He was appointed Ambassador of the United Kingdom to Mexico in 2021, replacing Corin Robertson. In May 2024, he was removed from that position when a video emerged of him pointing an assault rifle at an embassy employee while on a tour of the Mexican states of Sinaloa and Durango.
