= Noble baronets of Ardmore and Ardardan Noble (1902) =

The Noble baronetcy, of Ardmore and Ardardan Noble in Cardross in the County of Dunbarton, was created in the Baronetage of the United Kingdom on 24 July 1902 for the Scottish physicist and businessman Andrew Noble. The 2nd Baronet was High Sheriff of Northumberland in 1918.

== Noble baronets, of Ardmore and Ardardan Noble (1902) ==
- Sir Andrew Noble, 1st Baronet (1831–1915)
- Sir George John William Noble, 2nd Baronet (1859–1937)
- Sir Saxton William Armstrong Noble, 3rd Baronet (1863–1942)
- Sir Humphrey Brunel Noble, 4th Baronet (1892–1968)
- Sir Marc Brunel Noble, 5th Baronet (1927–1991) Sheriff of Kent, 1985
- Sir David Brunel Noble, 6th Baronet (born 1961)

The heir apparent is the present holder's son Roderick Lancaster Brunel Noble (born 1988).

Coat of arms of Noble baronets of Ardmore and Ardardan Noble
Crest A dexter hand couped holding a dagger all Proper. Escutcheon Argent three bay leaves slipped Proper. Supporters Two wild men wreathed and cinctured with bay leaves each supporting with the exterior hand a holly tree eradicated and resting the exterior foot on the roots thereof all Proper. Motto Virtute Et Valore

== Notes ==
Baronetage of the United Kingdom
Preceded by Muntz baronets	Noble baronets of Ardmore and Ardardan Noble; 24 July 1902	Succeeded by Parry baronets
