= Mexico–United Kingdom relations =

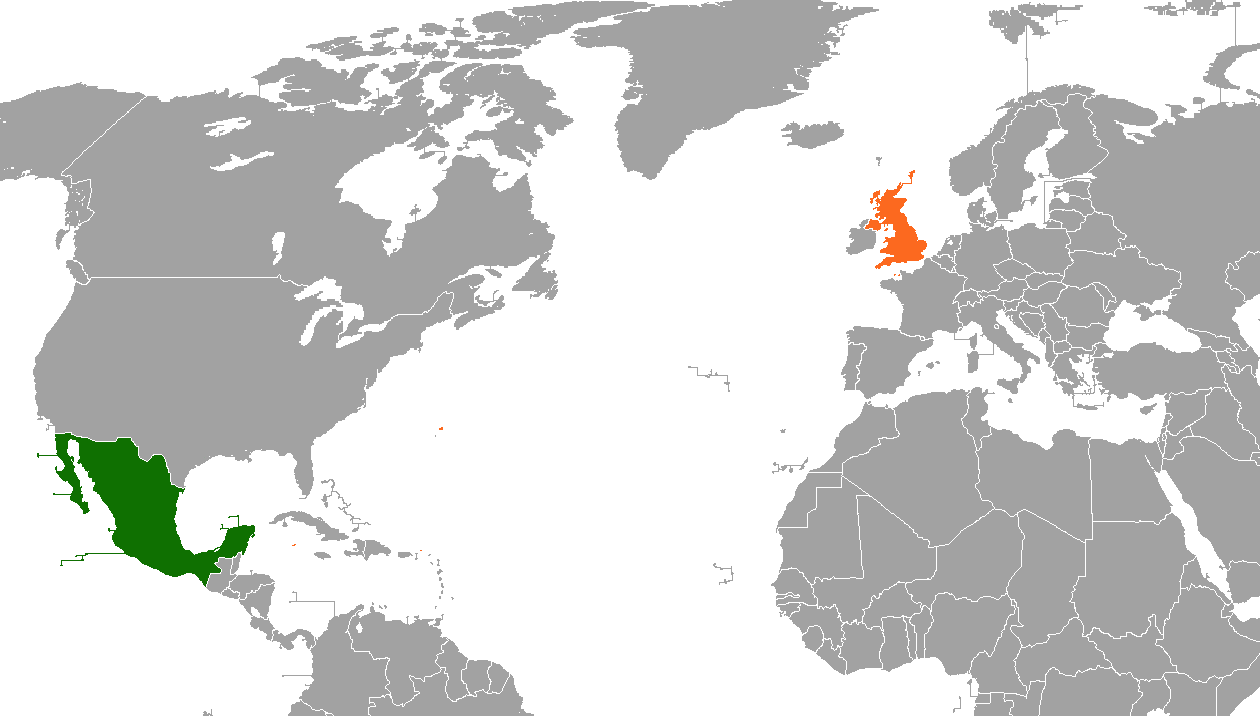

- Mexico: United Kingdom

Diplomatic mission
- Embassy of Mexico, London: British Embassy, Mexico City

Envoy
- Ambassador Josefa González Blanco Ortiz Mena: Ambassador vacant. (Note: Ambassador Jon Benjamin was relieved of his post earlier in 2024. Deputy Head of Mission Rachel Brazier appears on the embassy's website as chargée d'affaires.)

The nations of Mexico and the United Kingdom formally established diplomatic relations in 1826. However, diplomatic relations were severed in 1861 after the president of Mexico Benito Juárez suspended payments on its foreign debt to the U.K. Diplomatic relations were re-established in 1864 when the U.K. recognized Emperor Maximilian I of Mexico. After the death of the Emperor and the restoration of democracy in Mexico in 1867, relations were once again severed between both nations.

In 1884, diplomatic relations were restored under the Presidency of Porfirio Díaz. However, in 1938 relations were once again suspended when President Lázaro Cárdenas ordered the expropriation of all oil companies in Mexico. Diplomatic relations were re-established during World War II in 1941 and have continued unabated since.

Both nations are members of the G20, the Organisation for Economic Co-operation and Development and the United Nations.

== History ==
After Mexico achieved its independence in September 1821, Britain was the first European great power to recognize Mexican sovereignty. Soon afterwards, Emperor Agustín de Iturbide sent a diplomatic envoy to London to establish diplomatic communications between the two nations and both nations formally established diplomatic relations on 26 December 1826 through the signing of the Treaty of Friendship, Navigation and Commerce, which was later ratified in 1837. The British established a network of merchant houses in the major cities. According to historian Hilarie J. Heath, the results were bleak:

Trade was stagnant, imports did not pay, contraband drove prices down, debts private and public went unpaid, merchants suffered all manner of injustices and operated at the mercy of weak and corruptible governments, commercial houses skirted bankruptcy.

In November 1838, Mexico was involved in a brief war with France known as the Pastry War. Britain supported Mexico and intervened to find a diplomatic solution to end the war. In March 1839, Mexico and France ended their war when Mexico acquiesced to the French demands.

In 1861, President Benito Juárez suspended Mexico's interest payments to its creditors in France, Spain, and Britain. This act angered the three nations and in October 1861 the Convention of London was signed by the three nations to send joint navy ships to Mexico as a show of force to demand repayment by the Mexican government. In December 1861 the "triple-alliance" took the port of Veracruz and nearby towns. After a few months, both the Spanish and British government became evidently aware that Emperor Napoleon III of France was planning to initiate regime change in Mexico in order to expand its empire and take advantage of the fact that the United States was involved in its civil war (1861–65) and was not able to implement the Monroe Doctrine. The U.S. did not recognize the regime propped up by French troops. In early 1862, Britain and Spain pulled its forces from Mexico. This French invasion would later be known as the Second French intervention in Mexico. In 1864, France installed a puppet emperor in Mexico thus creating the Second Mexican Empire which lasted until 1867 with the execution of Emperor Maximilian I of Mexico. Britain had recognized his government, despite President Juárez never leaving the country. It nearly took 20 years for diplomatic relations to be restored, which was accomplished during the tenure of President Porfirio Díaz. Díaz was a liberal Army general who had defended Mexico against the foreign invasion.

After 1880, the British turned their attention in Mexico primarily to investments in railways and mines, sending both money and engineers and skilled mechanics. The British invested £7.4 million in railways during the 1880s, a figure that jumped to £53.4 million in the 1910s. The decade-total of new investment in mining went from £1.3 million in 1880s to £11.6 million in 1910s. Investments in land and other properties rose from near zero in 1880s to £19.7 million in 1910s. The totals reached £135 million, almost as much as the United States. In 1900, there were 2,800 British citizens living in Mexico, a relatively small number in contrast to the 15,000 Americans, 16,000 Spaniards, 4,000 French, and 2,600 Germans. The British were famed for their sophisticated clubs, and their elaborate sports programs: association football became a highly popular sport across Mexico; while cricket found no interest amongst the Mexican populace.

During World War I (1914–1918), Mexico was neutral while involved in its own civil war (1910–1920). In 1917 British intelligence intercepted the Zimmermann Telegram, and gave it to the United States government. Zimmermann was the German Foreign Minister who tried to induce Mexico to join the war against the United States in the hope of diverting American attention away from Europe. Mexico ignored the offer since it realized that its weak military would be quickly overwhelmed by the Americans.

In March 1938, President Lázaro Cárdenas expropriated all oil reserves, facilities, and foreign oil companies in Mexico. The British government, alongside the United States government, demanded compensation from the expropriation which the Mexican government refused to pay. As a result, diplomatic relations between the two nations were severed. Although relations were restored in 1942, the British government held out until 1947 in regards to demanding payment and was duly recompensated for the expropriation.

In May 1942, Mexico declared war on the Axis powers during World War II, thus officially entering on the side of the Allies. As a result of this, diplomatic relations between Mexico and the UK were re-established. Mexico was one of only two Latin American countries to send soldiers abroad to fight in World War II (the second country being Brazil). In 1944, both nations elevated their diplomatic representations to the level of embassies, and Sir Charles Bateman became the first British ambassador in Mexico and José Maximiliano Alfonso de Rosenzweig Díaz became the first Mexican ambassador to the United Kingdom. After the war, bilateral relations between the two nations normalized and trade re-commenced. In 1966, the first direct flights between Mexico City and London were inaugurated.

In 1973, President Luis Echeverría became the first Mexican head-of-State to visit the U.K. In 1975, Queen Elizabeth II paid her first State visit to Mexico. The Queen would visit for a second time in 1983. In 1981, Prime Minister Margaret Thatcher became the first British head-of-Government to visit Mexico to attend the North–South Summit in Cancún.

Mexico remained neutral during the Falklands War (April–June 1982); however, it was well known that the Mexican government did not support the military junta in Argentina at the time and secretly supported the UK.

=== Relations in the 21st century ===
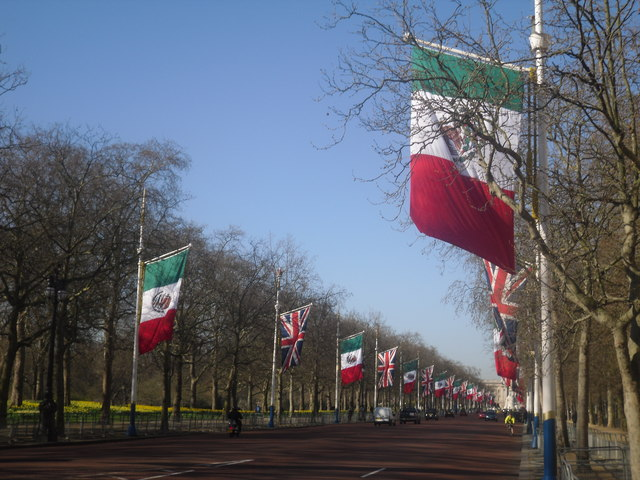
U.K. and Mexican flags lining up along The Mall in London for the State Visit for President Felipe Calderón to the U.K.; March 2009.

==== Dual Year ====
The Year of Mexico in the United Kingdom and the Year of the United Kingdom in Mexico, which took place in 2015, was a year of extensive, diverse and stimulating exchanges between Mexican and British people in terms of art, culture, science, the academic sector, business and tourism. Initially, it was to be a solely cultural project agreed between the chairman of the National Council for Culture and the Arts of Mexico, Rafael Tovar y de Teresa, and the Minister for Culture, Communications and Creative Industries of the United Kingdom, Edward Vaizey, on 4 July 2013. Subsequently, the ministries of foreign affairs of both countries decided to expand the scope of the Dual Year to other areas.

The many cultural events that took place in the United Kingdom included exhibitions of artists such as the British-born Mexican artist Leonora Carrington and Carlos Amorales; a folkloric Mexican dance spectacle by the Ballet Folklórico de México; a Lucha libre show at the Royal Albert Hall, as well as many seminars and concerts. Mexico was the guest of honour at the 2015 London Book Fair.

In Mexico, a special drama series, Los británicos ("The British"), a production of the BBC and British Council, aired on Canal 22 in February–April. Art exhibitions include artists such as Michael Landy, Stephen Willats and Simon Starling. The UK was the guest of honour at the Feria de las Culturas Amigas held in Mexico City and the Guadalajara International Book Fair.

In March 2015, President Enrique Peña Nieto, accompanied by the First Lady, Angélica Rivera, paid a State visit to the United Kingdom.

==== Present status ====
In September 2022, Mexican Foreign Secretary Marcelo Ebrard flew to London to represent Mexico and attend the State funeral of Queen Elizabeth II. In 2023, both nations celebrated 200 years of friendship.

In May 2024, it was revealed that the British ambassador, Jon Benjamin, had been removed from his position earlier in the year when a video emerged of him pointing an apparently loaded machine gun at embassy employees while on tour of the Mexican states of Sinaloa and Durango.

== High-level visits ==
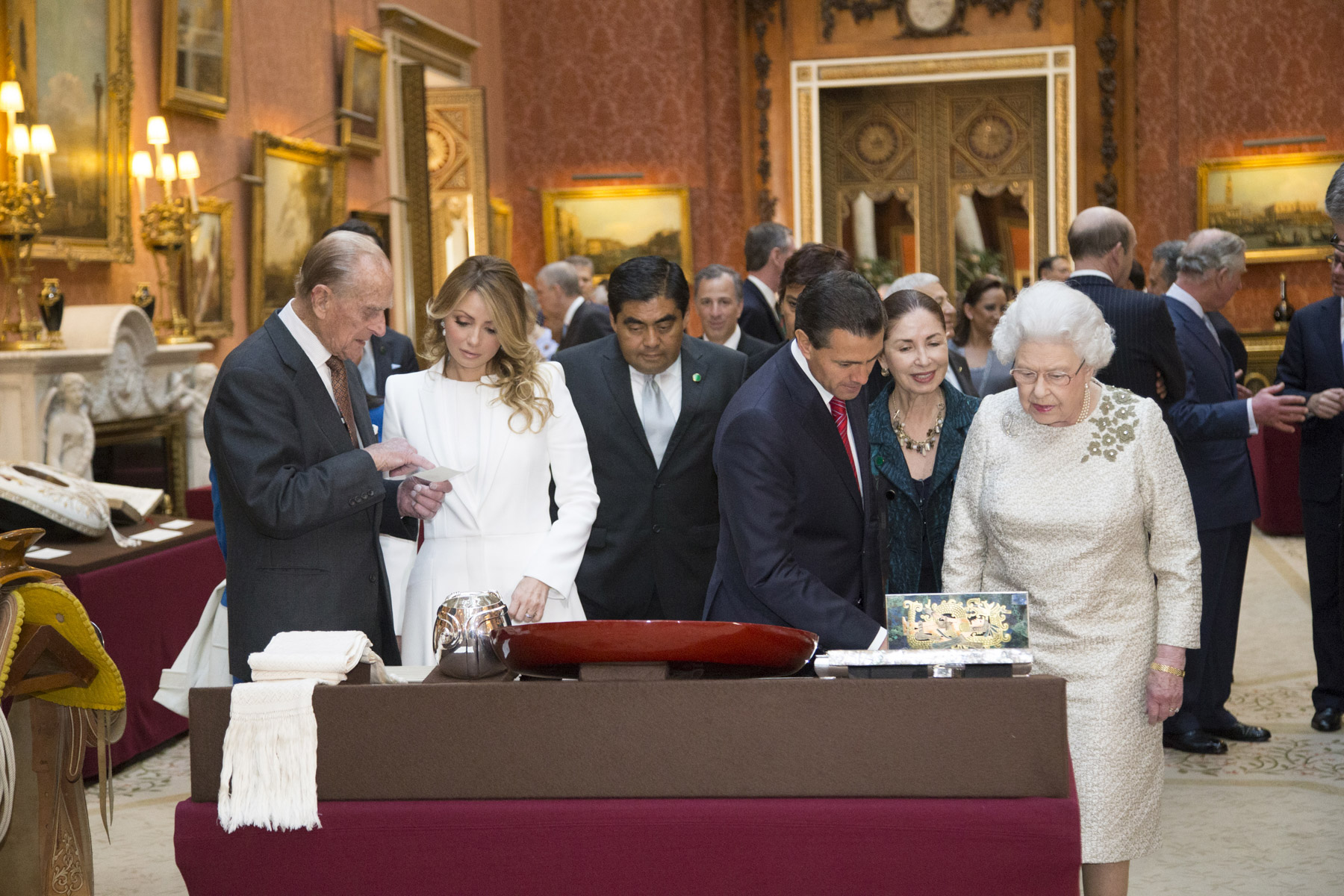
Queen Elizabeth II and President Enrique Peña Nieto in Buckingham Palace, London; March 2015.

High-level visits from Mexico to the United Kingdom

- President Luis Echeverría (1973)
- President Miguel de la Madrid Hurtado (1985)
- President Carlos Salinas de Gortari (1990, 1992)
- President Ernesto Zedillo (1996, 1998)
- President Vicente Fox (2002, 2005)
- President Felipe Calderón (2007, 2009)
- President Enrique Peña Nieto (2013, 2015)

High-level visits from the United Kingdom to Mexico

- Queen Elizabeth II (1975, 1983)
- Prime Minister Margaret Thatcher (1981)
- Charles, Prince of Wales (1966, 1970, 1993, 2002, 2014)
- Prime Minister Tony Blair (2002)
- Prime Minister David Cameron (2012)

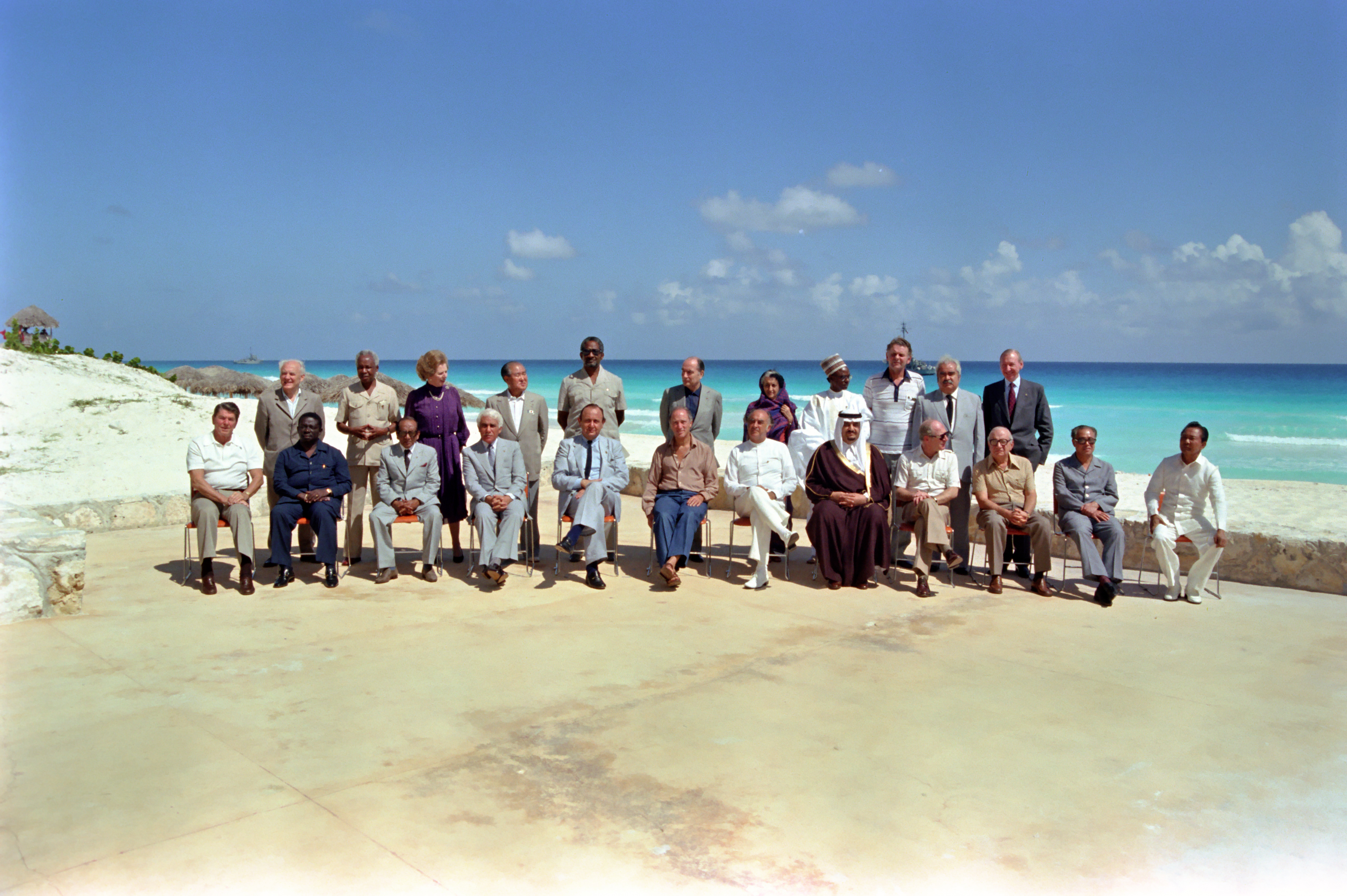
President José López Portillo and Prime Minister Margaret Thatcher attending the North–South Summit in Cancún, 1981.

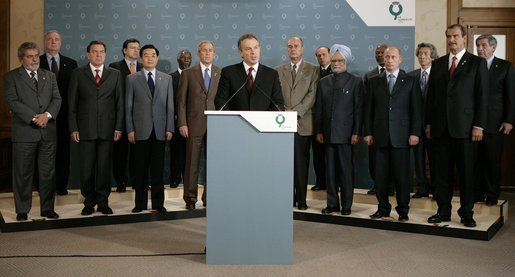
Prime Minister Tony Blair and President Vicente Fox in Auchterarder, Scotland; July 2005.

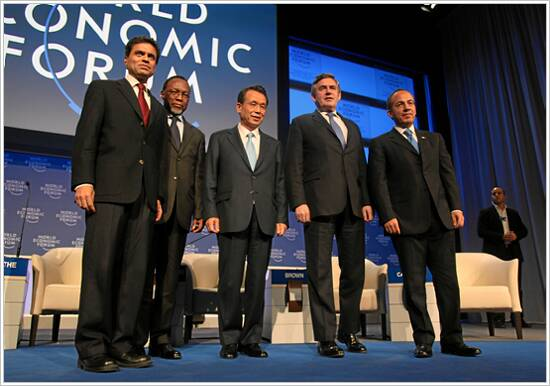
Prime Minister Gordon Brown and President Felipe Calderón in Davos, 2009.

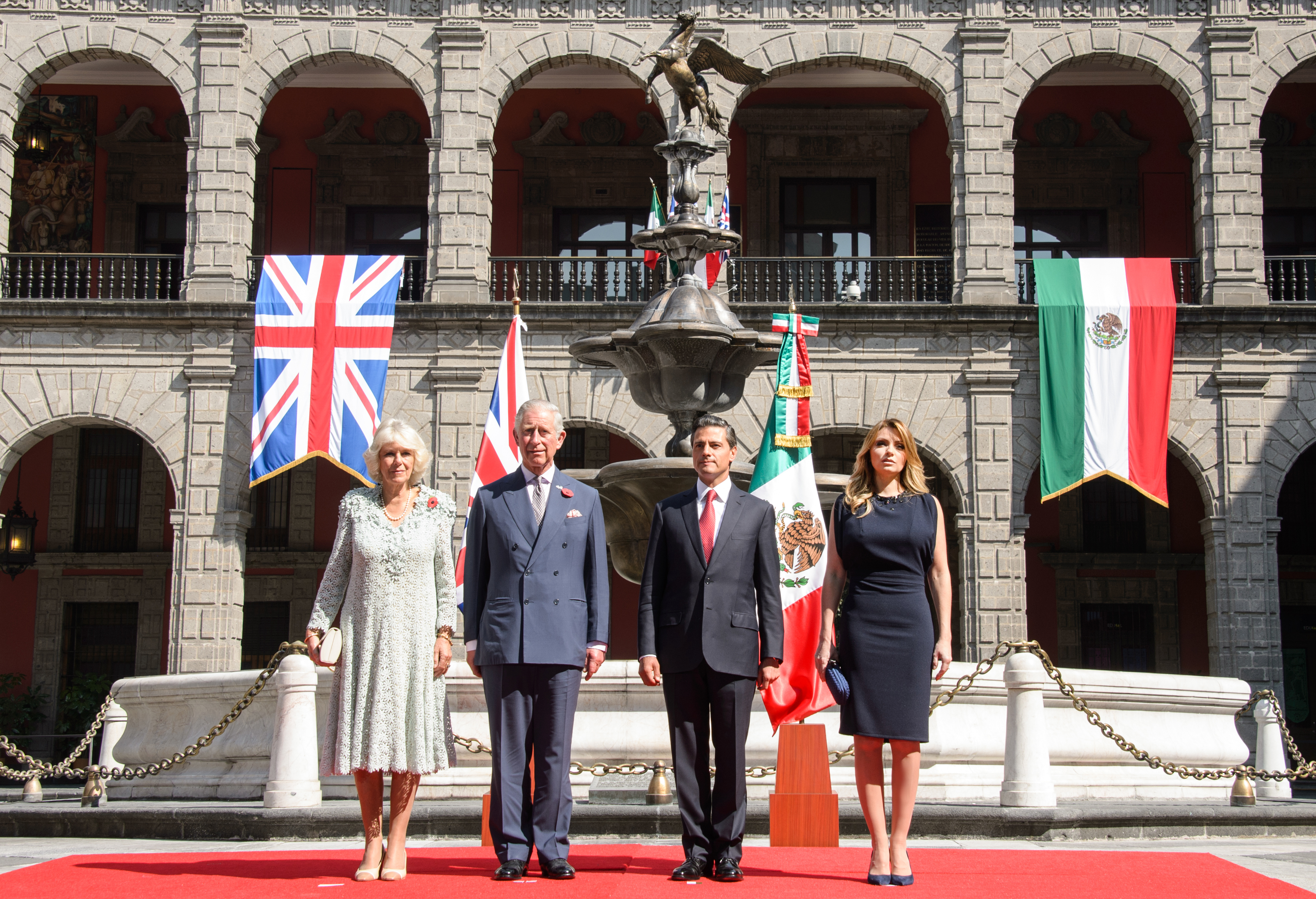
Then Prince Charles and Duchess Camilla with President Peña Nieto and First Lady Angelica Rivera in Mexico City; November 2014.

== Bilateral agreements ==
Both nations have signed several bilateral agreements such as an Extradition Treaty (1886); Agreement for the Transmission of Diplomatic Pouches (1946); Agreement for Consular Relations (1954); Agreement of Scientific and Technical Cooperation (1975); Agreement of Cultural Cooperation (1975); Agreement of Air Transportation (1988); Agreement of Cooperation in the Fight Against the Illicit Traffic and Abuse of Narcotic Drugs and Psychotropic Substances (1990); Agreement to Avoid Double Taxation and Prevent Tax Evasion in Taxes on Income and Capital Gains (1994); Agreement of Mutual Assistance in the Investigation, Assurance and Confiscation of Criminal Products and Instruments different from those of the Traffic of Narcotic Drugs (1996); Treaty on the Execution of Criminal Sentences (2004); Agreement for the Promotion and Reciprocal Protection of Investments (2006); Agreement on Mutual Recognition of Studies, Degrees, Diplomas and Academic Degrees of Higher Education between both nations (2015); Agreement on the Mutual Recognition and Protection of the Designations of Spirit Drinks (2020); and a Trade Continuity Agreement (2020).

== Transportation ==
There are direct flights between both nations, operated by Aeroméxico, British Airways and TUI Airways.

== Trade ==
In 1997, Mexico signed a Free Trade Agreement with the European Union, of which the United Kingdom was a member until 2020. Since the implementation of the free trade agreement in 2000, trade between the two nations has increased dramatically. In 2023, two-way trade between Mexico and the UK reached over US$5.6 billion. Mexico's main exports to the UK include: turbojets, turbopropellers and other gas turbines; telephones and mobile phones, parts and accessories for motor vehicles, tubes and pipes of iron or steel, minerals, medical instruments, coffee, fruit, honey, fish, and alcohol. The U.K.'s main exports to Mexico include: machinery and mechanical appliances, motor cars and other vehicles, medical instruments, chemical based products, ferroalloys, iron, steel, platinum, and clothing articles.

From 28 July 2014 until 30 December 2020, trade between Mexico and the UK was governed by the European Union–Mexico Free Trade Agreement, while the United Kingdom was a member of the European Union.

Following the withdrawal of the United Kingdom from the European Union, the UK and Mexico signed the Mexico–United Kingdom Trade Continuity Agreement on 15 December 2020. The Mexico–United Kingdom Trade Continuity Agreement is a continuity trade agreement, based on the EU free trade agreement, which entered into force on 1 January 2021. Trade value between Mexico and the United Kingdom was worth £5,868 million in 2022. Additionally the two countries are negotiating a Free Trade Agreement.

In July 2023, the United Kingdom signed the agreement to accede to the Comprehensive and Progressive Agreement for Trans-Pacific Partnership, a trade bloc of which Mexico is a founding member.

== Cultural relations ==
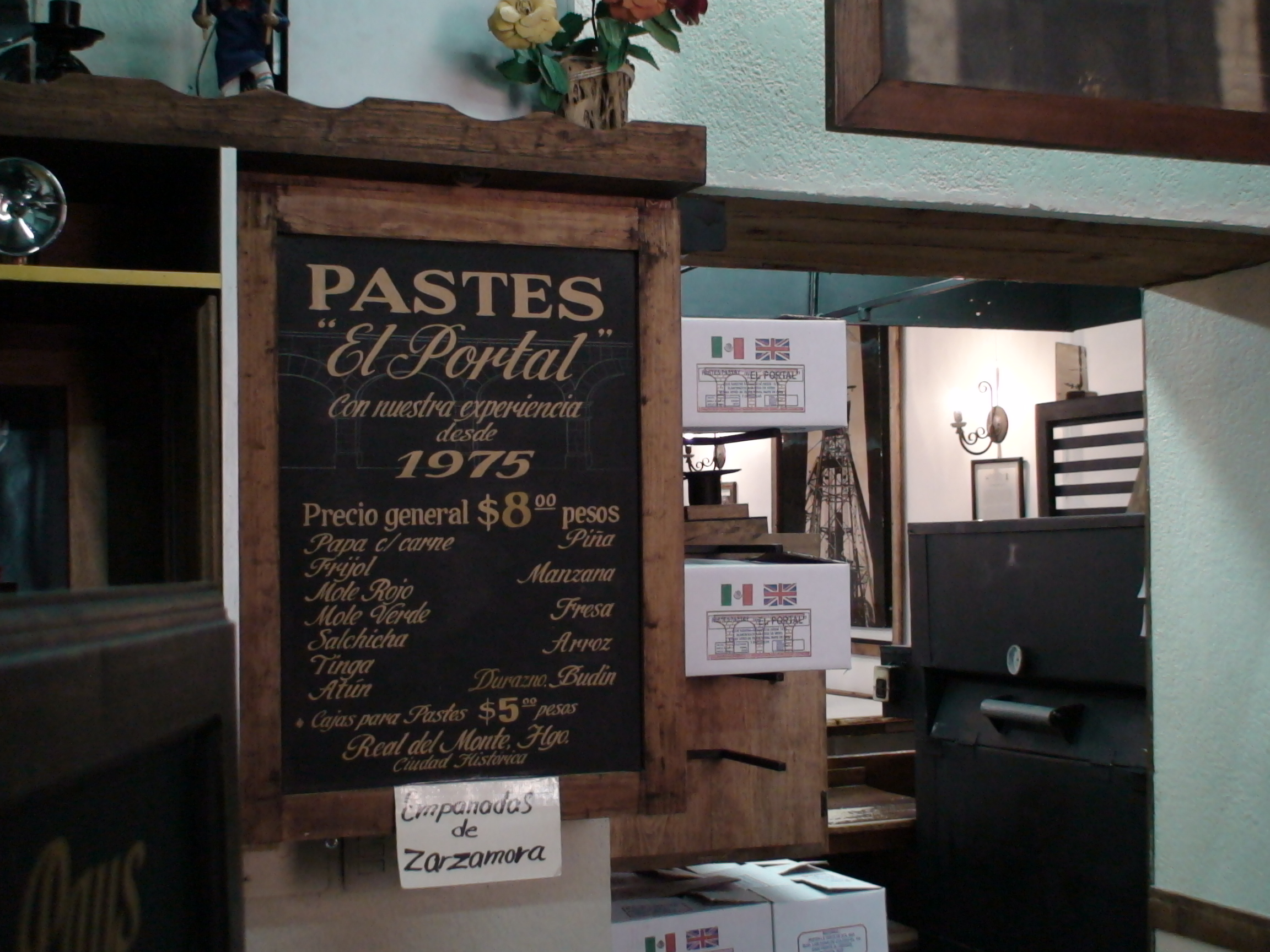
Sign in El Portal pastes shop in Real del Monte.

=== Cuisine ===
The paste is a pastry with Cornish roots. Introduced by miners from Cornwall who were contracted in the towns of Real del Monte and Pachuca in Hidalgo. The Cornish miners may have also introduced the turnip to Mexico.

=== Sports ===
The Cornish introduced institutionalized football to Mexico. A plaque was placed at the site of the first game in Real del Monte. The English also introduced other popular sports such as rugby union, tennis, cricket, polo, and chess. However, cricket lost popularity during World War I, when British expatriates had to leave Mexico to fight. Football clubs founded by Britons included the British Club, Rovers FC Mexico and Reforma Athletic Club. The most successful club founded by Britons is C.F. Pachuca.

== Drug trafficking ==
It has been reported that Mexican drug cartels have been using the port city of Liverpool for smuggling cocaine into Britain and Europe. In 2012, it was reported that the Sinaloa Cartel had drug distribution networks in England. In 2013, Scotland Yard broke a cocaine importation ring involving corrupt British Airways cargo workers at Heathrow Airport importing cocaine from Mexico City.

In 2017, it was reported that the Sinaloa Cartel had formed a pact with a Romanian crime syndicate who had control over transportation, which would allow the cartel to operate in Britain. A spokesperson for the National Crime Agency said "intelligence indicates that the Romanian OCG [organised crime group] are still being supplied by a Mexican OCG linked to the Sinaloa cartel. It is assessed that this network of OCGs will continue to supply large volumes of class A drugs into the UK."

In January 2026, criminals were convicted over a plan for organised crime groups to use UK airports to collect Mexican cocaine. In May 2024, 300kg of high purity cocaine with a street value of around £24 million was smuggled into Manchester Airport.

== Resident diplomatic missions ==
of Mexico in the United Kingdom

- London (Embassy)

of the United Kingdom in Mexico

- Mexico City (Embassy)
- Cancún (Consulate-General)

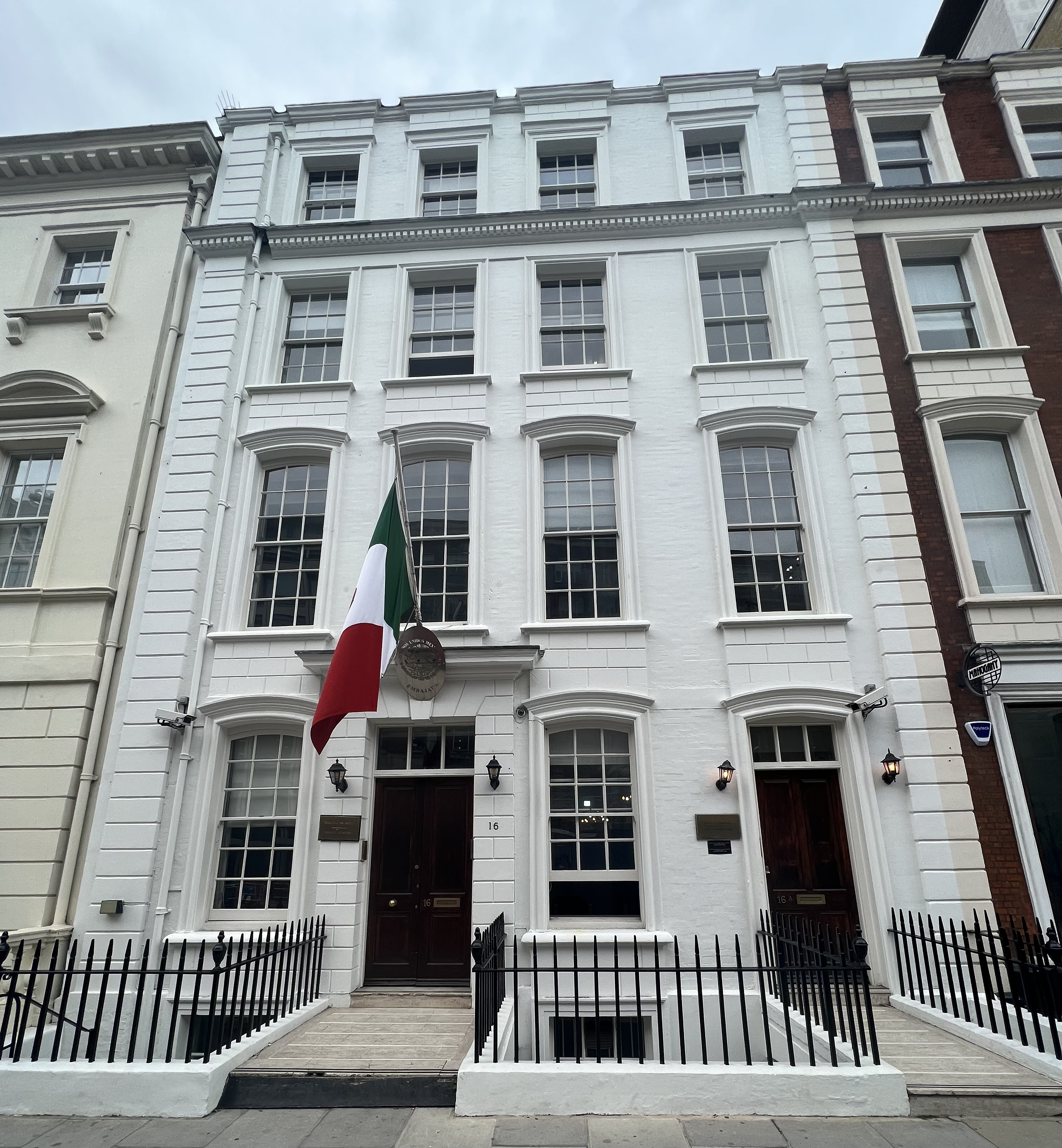
Embassy of Mexico in London

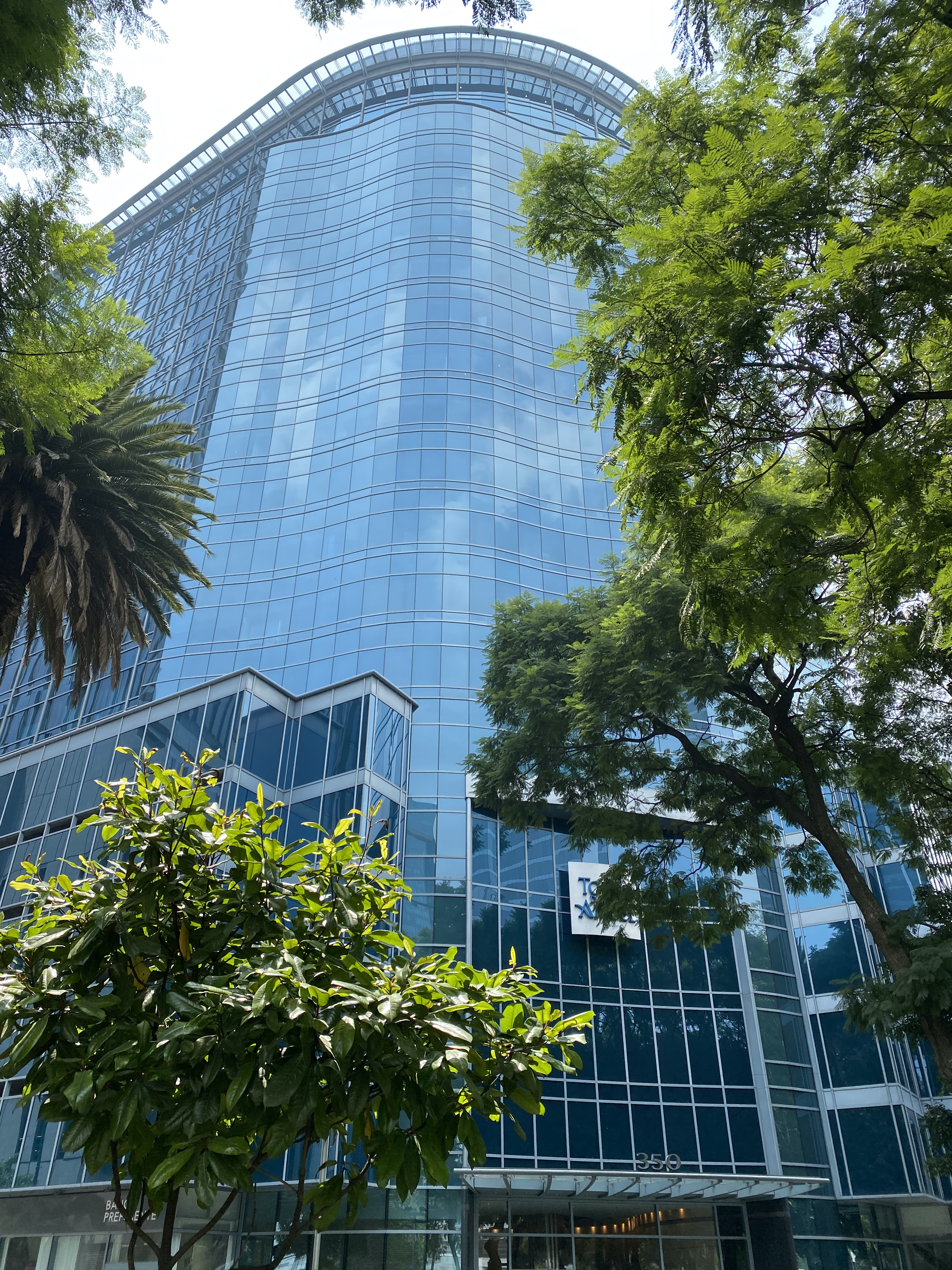
Building hosting the Embassy of the United Kingdom in Mexico City

== See also ==
- Foreign relations of Mexico
- Foreign relations of the United Kingdom
- Accession of the United Kingdom to CPTPP
- Britons in Mexico
- Cornish diaspora
- Mexicans in the United Kingdom
- Mexico–United Kingdom Free Trade Agreement
