= William Pury =

William Pury (by 1489 – 1537 or later), of New Windsor, Berkshire, was an English Member of Parliament (MP).

He was a Member of the Parliament of England for New Windsor in 1523. He was Mayor of Windsor from 1518 to 1519, and from 1522 to 1523.

Parliament of England
Preceded by unknown unknown	Member of Parliament for New Windsor; 1523; With: John Welles)	Succeeded by John Welles; Thomas Rider
