= Christopher Wren the Younger =

English politician, Son of Sir Christopher Wren (1675–1747)

MP for Windsor
- In office 1713–1715

Personal details
- Born: February 1675
- Died: 24 August 1747 (aged 72)
- Spouse(s): Mary Musard Constance Middleton (died 1734)
- Children: Christopher; Stephen
- Parents: Sir Christopher Wren; Faith Coghill
- Education: Eton College
- Alma mater: Pembroke College, Cambridge

Christopher Wren (1675–1747), of Wroxall Abbey, Warwickshire, was a Member of Parliament and the son of the architect Sir Christopher Wren.

== Life ==
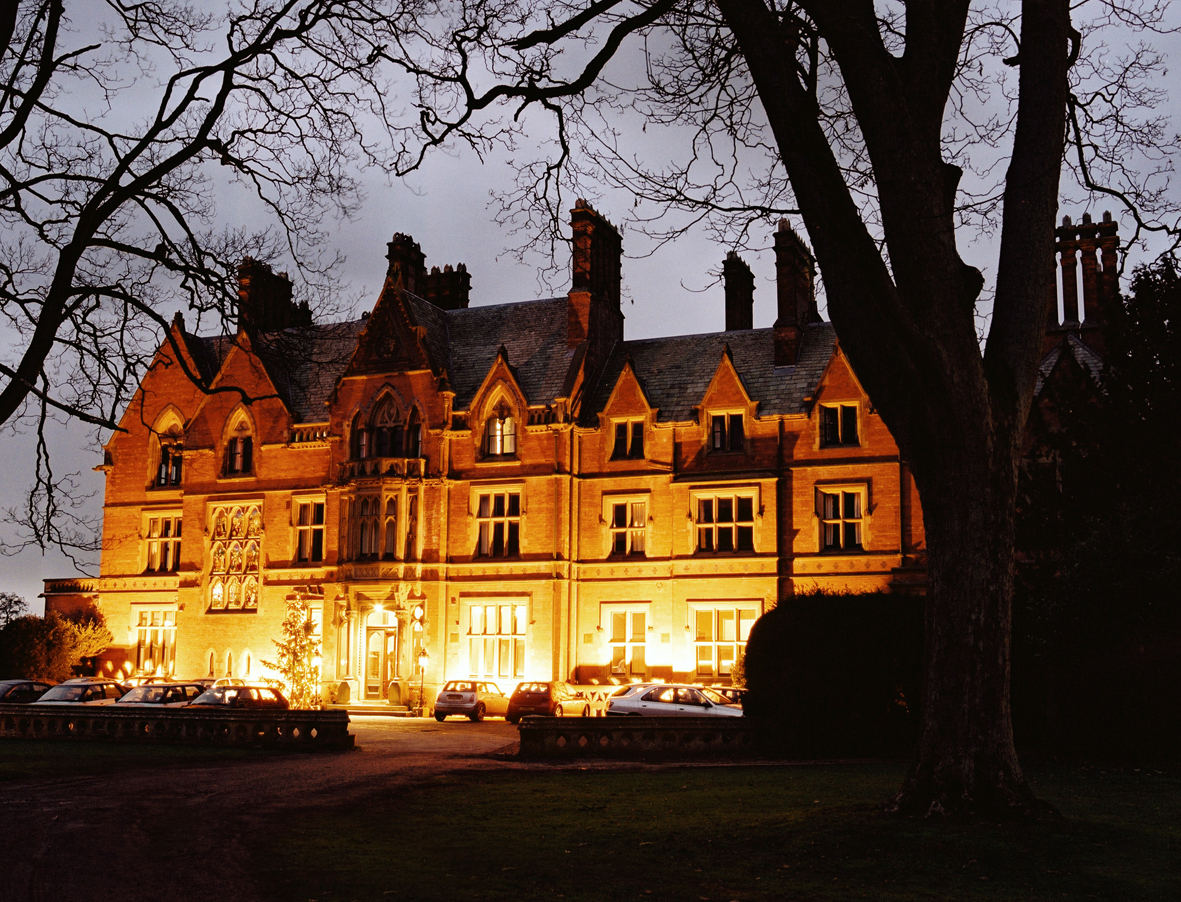
Wroxall Abbey, Warwickshire

Wren was the second but first surviving son of Sir Christopher Wren and his first wife, Faith Coghill, daughter of Sir John Coghill of Bletchingdon in Oxfordshire. He was educated at Eton and Pembroke College, Cambridge, where his father had built the new college chapel, his first completed work. His son entered the college in 1691, but left without a degree. He was elected a Fellow of the Royal Society in 1693. He entered the Middle Temple in 1694. In 1698/9 he travelled in Europe making an architectural tour of France, Italy and Holland with Edward Strong the Younger, whose father was his father's main building contractor. This trip may indicate a friendship over and above a simple working relationship.

On his return, Wren worked for his father as a clerk-of-works. He became Chief Clerk of Works in 1702 (to 1716). In 1708, he laid the last stone of the lantern which surmounts the dome of St Paul's Cathedral in the presence of his father. In 1711, he was appointed a Commissioner to organise the building of 50 new churches.

He represented Windsor in Parliament from 1713 to 1715. Re-elected in 1715, he lost his seat on petition. He also lost his post as Clerk of Works in 1716 and thereafter retired to live as a country squire at the Wroxall Abbey estate in Warwickshire that had been acquired by his father in 1713.

Wren collected documents about the life of his father, which were later published after his own death as the Parentalia by his son Stephen in 1750. His portrait, engraved by Faber, forms the frontispiece of the Parentalia. Two letters written to him by Sir Christopher while he was still a youth were printed in Miss Phillimore's Life (pp. 282, 302), that show their relationship was of an affectionate character. The younger Christopher was also a numismatist of some repute (Hearne, Collections, ed. Doble, ii. 264), and he published Numismatum Antiquorum Sylloge (London, 4to) in 1708.

Wren died in London on 24 August 1747. His first wife was Mary, daughter of Philip Musard, jeweller of Queen Anne. His second wife, Constance, daughter of Sir Thomas Middleton, and widow of Sir Roger Burgoyne, Bt., died on 23 May 1734. He left two surviving sons, Christopher (born 1710), who inherited Wroxall Abbey, and Stephen (born 1722).

== Sources ==
- Francis Cranmer Penrose, "Christopher Wren (1675–1747)", Dictionary of National Biography, 1885–1900, Volume 63
- D. Hayton, E. Cruickshanks, S. Handley (editors), "WREN, Christopher (1675-1747), of St. James’s Street, Westminster, Mdx. and Wroxall, Warws.", The History of Parliament: the House of Commons 1690-1715, at historyofparliamentonline.org, retrieved 28 August 2012

Parliament of Great Britain
Preceded by Charles Aldworth; Richard Topham	Member of Parliament for New Windsor; 1713–1715; With: Charles Aldworth; Robert Gayer	Succeeded by Sir Henry Ashurst, Bt; Samuel Travers

This article incorporates text from a publication now in the public domain: "Wren, Christopher (1632-1723)". Dictionary of National Biography. London: Smith, Elder & Co. 1885–1900.
