= Thomas Graves, 2nd Baron Graves =

Irish-British politician (1775–1830)

Thomas North Graves, 2nd Baron Graves (28 May 1775 – 7 February 1830) was a British peer and Member of Parliament.

== Biography ==
Graves was the son of Admiral Thomas Graves, 1st Baron Graves. He succeeded his father as second Baron Graves in 1802, but as this was an Irish peerage it did not entitle him to an automatic seat in the House of Lords. He was instead elected to the House of Commons for Okehampton in 1812, a seat he held until 1818, and then represented Windsor from 1819 to 1820 and Milborne Port from 1820 to 1827, when he retired from the Commons to become one of His Majesty's Commissioners of Revenue of Excise. He was also a Lord of the Bedchamber and Comptroller of the Household to His Royal Highness Ernest Augustus, 1st Duke of Cumberland and Teviotdale.

== Personal life ==
Lord Graves married Lady Mary Paget (1783–1835), daughter of Henry Bayly Paget, 1st Earl of Uxbridge, in 1803. They had twelve children, five sons and seven daughters:

- William Graves, 3rd Baron Graves (1804–1870)
- Hon. Jane Anne Graves (4 January 1805 – 14 September 1881), married Capt. James William Cuthbert (1805–1874) on 15 December 1829
- Hon. Caroline North Graves (18 April 1807 – 27 October 1861), married Maj-Gen. Hugh Percy Davison (1788–1849), on 18 January 1844
- Hon. Louisa Elizabeth Graves (June 1808 – 30 June 1868), married Charles Fieschi Heneage on 28 August 1827 and had issue, including Admiral Sir Algernon Charles Fieschi Heneage.
- Hon. Mary Elizabeth Charlotte (30 November 1810 – 25 December 1827)
- Hon. Augusta Champagne Graves (May 1812 – 16 October 1844), married Hon. Rev. William Towry Law, son of Edward Law, 1st Baron Ellenborough, on 15 March 1831 and had issue
- Hon. Hester Charlotte Graves (4 January 1814 – 30 January 1880), married Edward Isaac Hobhouse, son of Benjamin Hobhouse, on 4 January 1832 and had issue
- Lt Hon. George Augustus Frederick Clarence Graves (17 February 1816 – 19 November 1842)
- Hon. Isabella Letitia Graves (11 May 1817 – 26 October 1870), married Stephen Roland Woulfe, son of Stephen Woulfe, on 9 June 1853
- Hon. Henry Richard Graves (1818–1882)
- Capt. Hon. Adolphus Edward Paget Graves (26 January 1821 – 1 September 1891), Page of Honour, married Caroline Glubb Wriford in 1858 and had issue
- Hon. Paget Trefusis Graves (6 September 1825 – 26 June 1826)

He committed suicide in February 1830, aged 54, after reports that his wife was having an affair with the Duke of Cumberland. He was succeeded in the barony by his eldest son William. Lady Graves died in 1835.

== Arms ==
Coat of arms of Thomas Graves, 2nd Baron Graves
Crest A demi-eagle displayed and erased Or encircled round the body and below the wings by a ducal coronet Argent. Escutcheon Gules an eagle displayed Or ducally crowned Argent. On a canton of the last an anchor Proper. Supporters Two royal vultures wings close Proper. Motto Aquila Non Captat Muscas

== Notes ==
Parliament of the United Kingdom
Preceded by Gwyllym Lloyd Wardle; Albany Savile	Member of Parliament for Okehampton; 1812–1818; With: Albany Savile	Succeeded by Albany Savile; Christopher Savile
Preceded by Edward Disbrowe; John Ramsbottom	Member of Parliament for Windsor; 1819–1820; With: John Ramsbottom	Succeeded by John Ramsbottom; Sir Herbert Taylor
Preceded by Sir Edward Paget; Robert Matthew Casberd	Member of Parliament for Milborne Port; 1820–1827; With: Berkeley Thomas Paget 1820–1826; Arthur Chichester 1826–1827	Succeeded by Arthur Chichester; John Henry North
Peerage of Ireland
Preceded by Thomas Graves	Baron Graves; 1802–1830	Succeeded by William Thomas Graves
