= John Ramsbottom =

John Ramsbottom may refer to:

- John Ramsbottom (engineer) (1814–1897), English mechanical engineer who created many inventions for railways
- John Ramsbottom (mycologist) (1885–1974), British mycologist
- John Ramsbottom (MP), British Member of Parliament for Windsor 1810–1845 (known as John Ramsbottom, junior c.1810s)
