= Mayor of Windsor =

Mayor of Windsor may refer to:

- Mayor of Windsor, England
- Mayor of Windsor, Ontario
