= John Elley =

British Army general

Lieutenant-General Sir John Elley KCB KCH
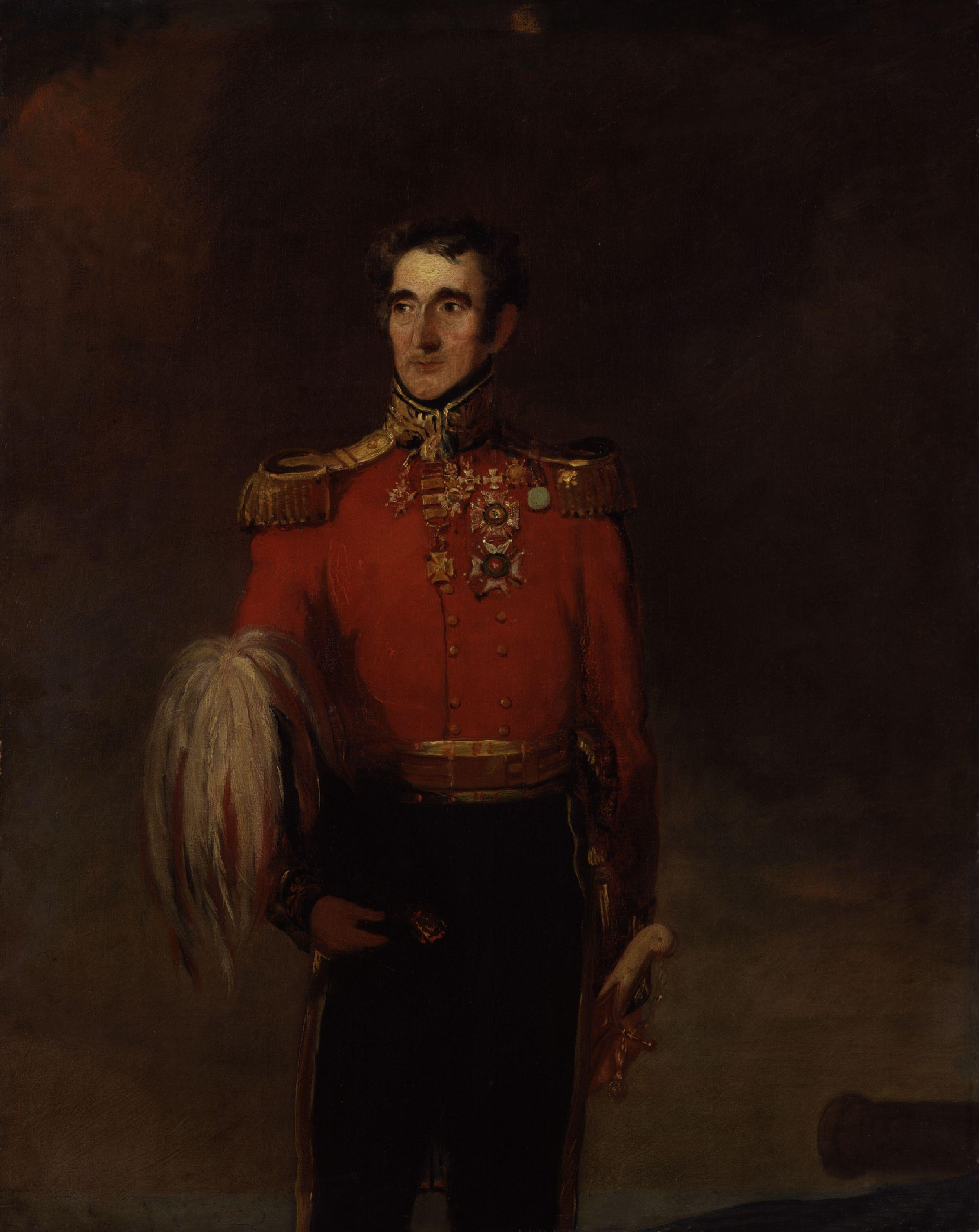
- Portrait by William Salter, 1836
- Born: 9 January 1764; London, England
- Died: 23 January 1839 (aged 75); Cholderton Lodge, East Cholderton, Hampshire, England
- Burial place: St George's Chapel, Windsor Castle
- Military career
- Allegiance: United Kingdom
- Branch: British Army
- Service years: 1789–1839
- Rank: Lieutenant-General
- Unit: Royal Regiment of Horse Guards
- Conflicts: French Revolutionary Wars; Napoleonic Wars
- Other work: Member of Parliament for Windsor

Lieutenant-General Sir John Elley KCB KCH (9 January 1764 – 23 January 1839) was a British soldier who joined the cavalry as a private and rose to general officer rank. He fought with distinction during the French Revolutionary and Napoleonic Wars, and later served as the last Governor of Galway and as Member of Parliament for Windsor.

== Early life ==
Information about Elley is scarce, perhaps partly because of his humble origins. He was born in London in 1764. His father ran an eating-house at Furnival's Inn, Holborn. Apprenticed to Mr. John Gelderd, a tannery owner of the village of Meanwood near Leeds, West Yorkshire, he became engaged to his master's daughter Anne. After her untimely death, he enlisted in 1789 as a trooper in the Royal Regiment of Horse Guards and saw service in the Flanders Campaign (1793–1795).

== Army career ==
Elley made his first step out of the ranks by becoming a cornet in his regiment on 14 June 1794. On 30 January 1796, he was promoted to lieutenant, and 11 January 1800 was made a captain-lieutenant. Elley acquired promotion to captain by purchase on 17 March 1801 to Major on 15 December 1804, and to lieutenant-colonel on 11 March 1806.

One famous act of heroism occurred at the 1809 Battle of Talavera. He led the charge, riding a white horse across unknown terrain. A chasm suddenly appeared before him and he was forced to jump it at full gallop. As he wrote in a letter to his sister Mrs Mary Ellis, dated 30 July 1809:

More fire I was never in, nor more perils did I escape. I led on one Squadron to the Charge as a forlorn hope and out of 80 men I had not a dozen left – a very severe List of Killed and Wounded you will see by the Gazette. It will be great Satisfaction to my good old Father to know that I had during the action a very conspicuous share, and in which I had the good Fortune to Succeed to the intense Satisfaction of the General Officers ... The battle lasted two days, the ground on which the battle was fought was clothed with corn, long grass and heath. The fire of the artillery was excessive and set fire to the corn and grass, the consequence was a number of the wounded were literally roasted alive.

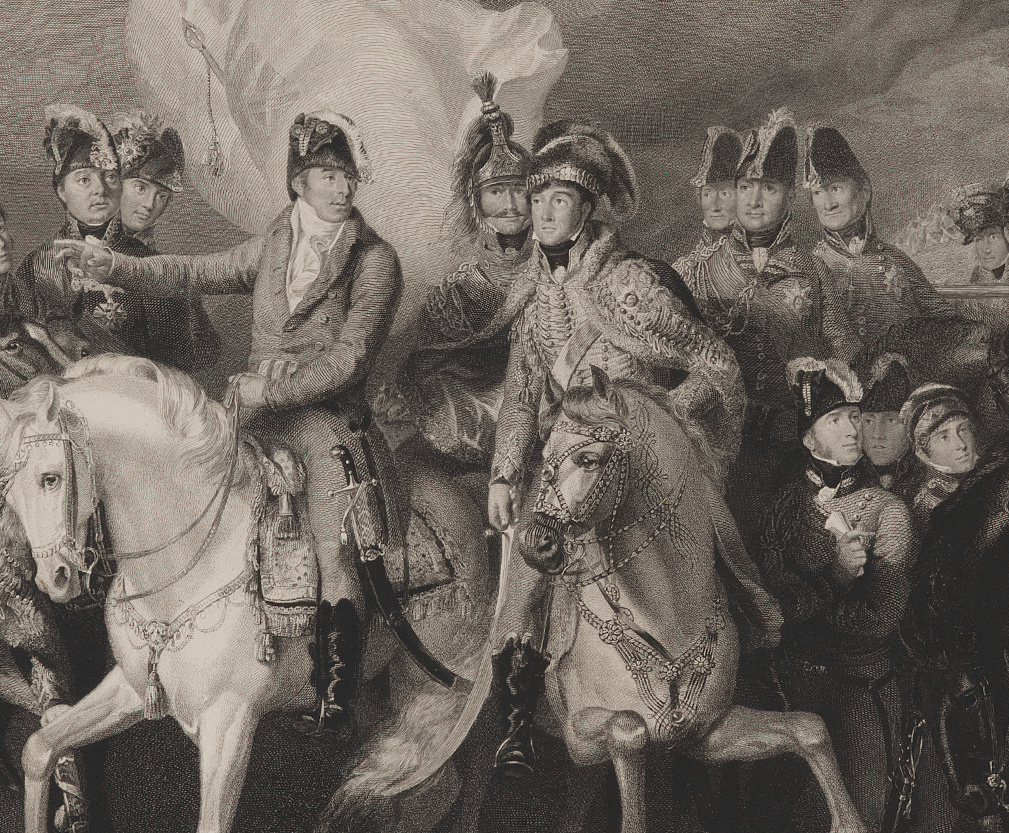
Detail from an engraving by Thomas Heaphy, at the National Portrait Gallery, showing Sir John Elley immediately behind the Duke of Wellington during the Peninsular War.

In his Reminiscences and Recollections, Rees Howell Gronow described several scenes involving Elley, including one from the Battle of Vitoria in 1813:

Sir John Elley, observing this disaster, got together as many of the 14th and 16th Dragoons as he could, and charged at the head of them through the enemy; thereby saving many of the fine fellows who were dispersed and unable to act. In the charge he was knocked down, together with his horse, the fall breaking his leg; and although continually ridden over by friend and foe in the melee, Elley, nothing daunted, cheered on his men to fight for the honour of old England, and at last, catching hold of Sergeant Cooper's stirrup, was dragged to the rear.

A contemporaneous letter from an interlocutor of King George III described George III's preoccupation with pedigree and quoted him as saying of Elley: "Fine man! Fine man! No family! No family! Fine soldier! Fine soldier!".

On 4 January 1815, Elley was named a Knight Commander of the Order of the Bath.

=== Waterloo Campaign ===
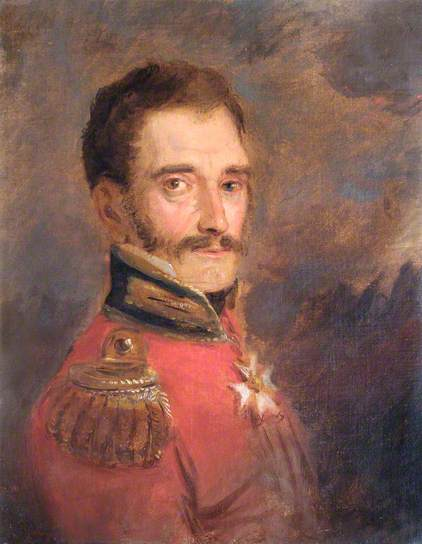
1821 portrait study of Elley by Jan Willem Pieneman for the painting "Battle of Waterloo", held at the Rijksmuseum.

As a colonel in the 1st Regiment of Life Guards, Sir John was appointed Deputy Adjutant-General of Cavalry at the start the Waterloo Campaign. Two days after attending the Duchess of Richmond's Ball, he led the charge of the Life Guards during the holding action at Genappe during the Anglo-allied retreat from Quatre Bras to Waterloo. He was severely wounded during the subsequent battle. Sir Walter Scott, in Paul's Letters to his Kinsfolk, described his feats at the attack on the escarpment of Mont-Saint-Jean, a ridge to the south of the village of Waterloo:

Sir John Elley, who led the charge of the heavy brigade, was himself distinguished for personal prowess. He was at one time surrounded by several of the cuirassiers; but, being a tall and uncommonly powerful man, completely master of his sword and horse, he cut his way out, leaving several of his assailants on the ground, marked with wounds, indicating the unusual strength of the arm which inflicted them. Indeed, had not the ghastly evidence remained on the field, many of the blows dealt upon this occasion would have seemed borrowed from the annals of knight-errantry, for several of the corpses exhibited heads cloven to the chine, or severed from the shoulders.

On 2 August 1815, Sir John was made a Knight of the Order of Maria Theresa by the Emperor of Austria, and on 21 August 1815 he was awarded the Order of St. George by the Emperor of Russia.

Lieutenant-General Sir Harry Smith remembered Sir John as his mentor in this extract from his autobiography from 1818:

The celebrated Cavalry officer, Sir John Elley, a very tall, bony, and manly figure of a man, with grim-visaged war depicted in his countenance, with whiskers, moustaches, etc. like a French Pioneer, came over to Dover during the time of our occupation of France. He was walking on the path, with his celebrated sword belted under his surtout. As the hooking up of the sword gave the coat-flap the appearance of having something large concealed under it, a lower order of Custom officer ran after him, rudely calling, "I say, you officer, you! stop, stop, I say! What's that under your coat?" Sir John turned round, and drawing his weapon of defence in many a bloody fight, to the astonishment of the John Bulls, roared out through his moustache in a voice of thunder, "That which I will run through your d—d guts, if you are impertinent to me!

=== Post-war ===
Sent to Ireland following the war, Elley was promoted to major-general in August 1819 and was made a Knight of the Royal Guelphic Order that same year.

He was appointed the Commander of Connaught, and then Governor of Galway from 1826 – this position was not filled after his death. On 23 November 1829, he was appointed colonel of the 17th Lancers (Woolwich Depot), replacing Lord Edward Somerset.

At the state funeral of George IV on 15 July 1830, Elley was one of the group of senior Army and Navy officers who supported the canopy of purple velvet over the body as it was taken to St George's Chapel, Windsor Castle, for the funeral service.

He was promoted to lieutenant-general on 10 January 1837.

One of his portraits, held by the National Portrait Gallery, was painted about 1837 as a study for the famous William Salter painting Waterloo Banquet at Apsley House, 1836, which depicts a commemorative banquet held by the Duke of Wellington at his London home on the anniversary of the battle.

== Member of Parliament ==
He was elected Member of Parliament for Windsor as part of Robert Peel's Tory party in January 1835. In 1836 the Eton & Windsor Gazette complained of the undue influence of the Castle on elections for that seat:

It is well known in this Borough there are a number of Electors who hold situations in the Royal Establishment, but who reside in the town. At the election of Members of Parliament those men – footmen, pages, and other – have been generally rendered subservient to Tory purposes. They are men who are permitted to have no opinion of their own, but are commanded by some one or other of their superiors in the Establishment of Their Majesties, to vote in a certain way. This it was that occasioned the return of Sir John Elley at the last election, who is frequently a guest at the Castle, and who of course obtains the influence of the many Tory hangers-on of the Court.

== Death and legacy ==
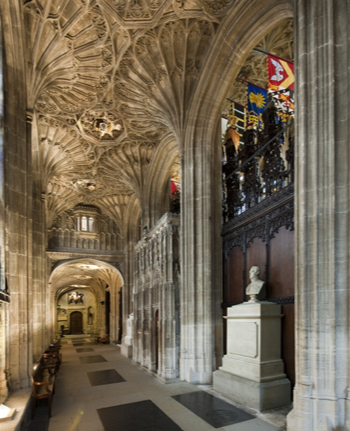
Tomb of Sir John Elley (lower right) in the north quire aisle of St. George's Chapel, Windsor Castle.

Sir John Elley died on 23 January 1839 at Cholderton Lodge at East Cholderton, part of Amport in Hampshire and was buried at St George's Chapel, Windsor Castle, not far from another of his properties at Burghfield Hill. His tomb, in the north quire aisle, includes a bust in white marble and an inscription that reads in part, "Unaided by dignity of birth, or the influence of fortune, he raised himself to the highest rank in the British Army by distinguished conduct in the field."

Though unmarried, Sir John was believed to have fathered at least one illegitimate son, who, legend has it, emigrated to Van Diemen's Land (Tasmania).

In his will, dated 6 April 1838, Sir John left nothing to any member of his family. However, an Isabella Elizabeth Elley, daughter of the Reverend William Gifford Cookesley, of Eton College, was to receive a legacy of £300. The main beneficiary of the will was Sir John's housekeeper, Jane Carter. She was to receive a sizable portion of the contents of his home, a legacy of £2,000 and £300 a year for life. The Officers Mess of the Horse Guards was to receive a legacy of £300 for the purchase of plate. Various charities also benefited. When certain legacies proved void, the executor of Sir John's estate sued for direction in Hopkinson v. Ellis, as a result of which, in 1846, a portion of the estate passed to the children of Sir John's late sister, Mrs Ellis.

Parliament of the United Kingdom
Preceded by John Ramsbottom; John Edmund de Beauvoir	Member of Parliament for Windsor; 1835–1837; With: John Ramsbottom	Succeeded by John Ramsbottom; Robert Gordon
Military offices
Preceded by Peter Daly	Governor of Galway; 1826–1839	Office abolished
Preceded by Lord Edward Somerset	Colonel of the 17th Regiment of (Light) Dragoons (Lancers); 1829–1839	Succeeded by Sir Joseph Straton
