= John Berkeley, 4th Viscount Fitzhardinge =

English courtier, treasury official, army officer and politician

John Berkeley, 4th Viscount Fitzhardinge of Bruton, Somerset (1650 – 19 December 1712) was an English courtier, treasury official, army officer and politician who sat in the English and British House of Commons from 1690 to 1710.

== Early life ==
Berkeley was the second surviving son of Charles Berkeley, 2nd Viscount Fitzhardinge and his wife Penelope Godolphin, daughter of Sir William Godolphin, MP, of Godolphin, Cornwall. His father and brothers were active in the Royal service after the Restoration, and Berkeley himself was a Page of Honour to King Charles II from 1668 to 1672. His brother Charles was granted the Irish peerage of Lord Fitzhardinge, which passed to his father and thence to John's elder brother Maurice.

== Career ==
Berkeley joined the Army in 1673 as an ensign in Lord Le Power's Foot. He became a captain in the 1st Foot Guards in 1675 and a lieutenant-colonel in Colonel Edward Villiers’ Foot in 1678. He was Master of Horse to Princess Anne from 1685 to 1702. He fought at the Battle of Sedgemoor in 1685 and was made colonel of his own regiment of Dragoons (later the 4th Queen's Own Hussars) from 1685 to 1688 and from 1688 to 1693. He was promoted brigadier-general in 1690. He sometime married Barbara, the daughter of Sir Edward Villiers, Knight Marshal of the Royal Household.

In 1690 Berkeley inherited the Irish peerage from his brother Maurice. After inheriting the family seat at Bruton, Somerset he was made Custos Rotulorum of Somerset from 1690 to his death. He was returned as Member of Parliament for Hindon at a by-election on 20 April 1691. He was appointed to two committees dealing with expenditure on the army in November 1691, and was nominated a member of a conference committee on the mutiny bill in February 1692. After two years as Governor of Kinsale from 1692 to 1693, he was appointed Teller of the Receipt of the Exchequer for life in 1694. At the 1695 English general election he was returned unopposed as MP for Windsor as a Court supporter. He signed the Association in February, and voted for fixing the price of guineas at 22 shillings in March 1696. At the 1698 English general election, he was returned again as MP for Windsor. He voted against the third reading of the disbanding bill on 31 January 1699. He was returned unopposed at the two general elections of 1701 and at the 1702 English general election. In 1702, he was appointed Treasurer of the Chamber to Queen Anne and in 1703 his wife was granted a pension of £600 p.a, having been governess to the late Duke of Gloucester. He was returned unopposed at the 1705 English general election and voted for the Court candidate for Speaker on 25 October 1705. He supported the Court on the 'place clause' in the regency bill in February 1706. At the 1708 British general election he was returned unopposed as a Whig for Windsor. He voted for the naturalization of the Palatines in 1709 and for the impeachment of Dr Sacheverell in 1710. He retired at the 1710 British general election. The Queen let him keep his posts in the Exchequer and household.

== Death and legacy ==
Fitzharding died, with the title, at Windsor of palsy on 19 December 1712 and was buried in Westminster Abbey. By his wife he had two daughters:

- Hon. Frances Berkeley, married Sir Thomas Clarges, 2nd Bt. before 1721. They had two children and was an ancestor of the third and final baronets.
- Hon. Mary Berkeley (bef. 1671 – 3 June 1741), married Walter Chetwynd, 1st Viscount Chetwynd of Bearhaven on 27 May 1703 in St. Martin-in-the-Fields in Westminster. She was a maid of honor to Queen Anne. No issue.

Without a male heir, his title became extinct.

Parliament of England
Preceded by Robert Hyde; Thomas Chafin	Member of Parliament for Hindon; 1691–1695; With: Robert Hyde	Succeeded by Robert Hyde; Sir Charles Morley
Preceded by Sir Charles Porter; Sir William Scawen	Member of Parliament for New Windsor; 1695–1707; With: Sir William Scawen1695-1698; Richard Topham1698-1707	Succeeded by Parliament of Great Britain
Parliament of Great Britain
Preceded by Parliament of England	Member of Parliament for New Windsor; 1707–1710; With: Richard Topham	Succeeded by William Paul; Richard Topham
Honorary titles
Preceded by The Viscount Fitzhardinge	Custos Rotulorum of Somerset; 1690–1712	Succeeded by The Earl Poulett
Peerage of Ireland
Preceded by Maurice Berkeley	Viscount Fitzhardinge; 1690–1712	Extinct
