= John Edmund de Beauvoir =

British Radical politician

Sir John Edmund de Beauvoir Bt

Member of Parliament for Windsor
- In office 7 January 1835 – 6 April 1835 Serving with John Ramsbottom
- Preceded by: Samuel Pechell; John Ramsbottom
- Succeeded by: John Ramsbottom; John Elley

Personal details
- Born: John Edmund Browne; 10 December 1794
- Died: 29 April 1869 (aged 74)
- Party: Radical
- Spouse(s): Laetitia Mann (m. 1867) Mary Wright (m. 1825; died 1831)

Sir John Edmund de Beauvoir, 2nd Baronet (10 December 1794 – 29 April 1869), known as John Edmund Browne until 14 October 1826, was a British Radical politician.

He was the son of Sir John Edmond Browne, 1st Baronet and Margaret Lorinan. Between 1825 and 1826, he married Mary Wright, daughter of Richard Wright, but after he death in 1831, he remarried to Laetitia Mann, daughter of Reverend Charles Mann and Susanna MacDougal on 16 March 1867. He was appointed a Knight on 9 March 1827, and succeeded as 2nd Baronet Browne of Palmerstown on 5 September 1835, upon his father's death.

De Beauvoir was elected Radical Member of Parliament for Windsor at the 1835 general election but was unseated four months later. While he attempted to regain the seat at the 1837 and 1841 general elections, he was unsuccessful.

He was also an officer in the 26th (Cameronian) Regiment of Foot.

Parliament of the United Kingdom
Preceded by Samuel Pechell; John Ramsbottom	Member of Parliament for Windsor; Jan. 1835–Apr. 1835; With: John Ramsbottom	Succeeded by John Ramsbottom; John Elley
Baronetage of Great Britain
Preceded by John Edmond Browne	Baronet (of Palmerston); 1835 – 1869	Succeeded by Charles Manley Browne
