= Disbrowe =

Disbrowe is a surname. Notable people with the surname include:

- Edward Disbrowe (1754–1818), English soldier and politician
- Edward Cromwell Disbrowe (1790–1851), British politician and diplomat, son of Edward
