= Richard Harrison (Royalist) =

English politician (1583–1655)

Sir Richard Harrison (31 August 1583 – 5 May 1655) was an English politician who sat in the House of Commons variously between 1621 and 1640. He supported the Royalist side in the English Civil War.

Harrison was the son of Richard Harrison of Hurst in Berkshire and his wife Elizabeth, daughter of Thomas Anton of Stratfield Saye in Hampshire, the Clerk of the Court of Wards and Liveries. His father died in 1587 and his mother remarried to Robert Marsh of Edmonton in Middlesex and Finchampstead in Berkshire. Harrison matriculated at St Mary Hall, Oxford on 1 July 1603 aged 19. He inherited the estates of Hurst and East Court at Finchampstead from a grand uncle Richard Warde (the son of Richard Warde Senior MP). He was knighted on 31 August 1621.

In 1621 Harrison was elected Member of Parliament (MP) for Wootton Bassett. He was elected MP for Berkshire in 1624 and again in 1628 and sat until 1629 when King Charles decided to rule without parliament for eleven years. Harrison lived at his manor-house at Hurst, and was a friend of Archbishop Laud, who referred to him in his diary in 1625 and 1626 when Laud visited Sir Francis Windebank at Haines Hill in Hurst. He is said to have been created a baronet but the patent was lost. He was High Sheriff of Berkshire in 1636.

In April 1640, Harrison was elected MP for Windsor in the Short Parliament. In the civil war, his son Richard fought on the Royalist side and the family suffered in the royal cause.

Harrison married Frances, the daughter of George Garrard, of Dorney in Buckinghamshire, and his wife, Margaret Dacres. They had two sons and three daughters.

Harrison died at the age of 72 and was buried in Hurst parish church.

Parliament of England
Preceded by Sir William Willoughby; Edward Hungerford	Member of Parliament for Wootton Bassett; 1621–1622; With: John Wrenham	Succeeded by Sir Roland Egerton, 1st Baronet; John Bankes
Preceded by Sir Richard Lovelace; Sir Robert Knollys	Member of Parliament for Berkshire; 1624; With: Edmund Dunch	Succeeded by Sir Francis Knollys; Edmund Dunch
Preceded by John Fettiplace; Edmund Dunch	Member of Parliament for Berkshire; 1628–1629; With: John Fettiplace	Parliament suspended until 1640
Vacant Parliament suspended since 1629	Member of Parliament for Windsor; 1640; With: Sir Arthur Ingram	Succeeded by Cornelius Holland; William Taylor
