= Annesley Somerville =

Annesley Ashworth Somerville (16 November 1858 – 15 May 1942) was a schoolteacher turned politician. He taught for forty years before turning to politics, then for twenty years served as a Conservative Party politician in the United Kingdom.

Somerville was born at Ballincollig in County Cork in Ireland and studied mathematics at Queen's College, Cork (BA 1875), and at Trinity College, Cambridge (BA 1880), where he was also a Mathematical Scholar. He then became a schoolmaster, first at Wellington College and then at Eton College.

He was elected as member of parliament (MP) for Windsor at the 1922 general election, and served until he died in office in 1942.

Parliament of the United Kingdom
Preceded by Ernest Gardner	Member of Parliament for Windsor; 1922–1942	Succeeded by Charles Mott-Radclyffe
