= Charles Edwards (Liberal politician) =

British politician (1825–1889)

Member of Parliament for Windsor
- In office 9 May 1866 – 17 November 1868 Serving with Roger Eykyn
- Preceded by: Henry Hoare; Henry Labouchère
- Succeeded by: Roger Eykyn

Personal details
- Born: 1825
- Died: 22 February 1889 (aged 63)
- Party: Liberal

Charles Edwards (1825 – 22 February 1889) was a British Liberal Party politician.

Edwards inherited the Dolserau Hall estate in 1858. He was a Justice of the peace of Merionethshire, and the High Sheriff in 1871.

== Political career ==
Edwards was elected MP for Windsor at a by-election in 1866—caused by Henry Hoare and Henry Labouchère being unseated when the 1865 general election was declared void on petition, due to bribery via election agents—and held the seat until 1868 when he did not seek re-election.

In 1879, he stood as the Liberal Party candidate in the 1879 Canterbury by-election. He lost narrowly to the Conservative candidate. After the election, it emerged that Edwards had spent about £140 (equivalent to £14,408 in 2025) on buying votes during the campaign. Although Edwards disclaimed knowledge of this and blamed his campaign manager, he did admit that the money was spent on bribery and he had personally repaid the amount to his manager.

In 1880, he stood again in Canterbury in the general election, and again narrowly lost the seat.

Parliament of the United Kingdom
Preceded by Henry Hoare; Henry Labouchère	Member of Parliament for Windsor; 1866–1868; With: Roger Eykyn	Succeeded by Roger Eykyn
