= Isabella Letitia Woulfe =

Irish-British writer (1817–1870)

- Born: Isabella Letitia Graves; 11 May 1817
- Died: 26 October 1870 (aged 53)
- Occupation: Writer
- Notable work: Guy Vernon
- Father: Thomas Graves, 2nd Baron Graves
- Relatives: Stephen Woulfe (father-in-law)

Isabella Letitia Woulfe (11 May 1817 – 26 October 1870) was an Irish-British writer.

== Early life ==
Woulfe was born on 11 May 1817, one of twelve children of Thomas Graves, 2nd Baron Graves and Mary Paget, daughter of Henry Paget, 1st Earl of Uxbridge. The peerage was Irish but Graves was also a member of Parliament in Britain and so although not entitled to sit in the House of Lords he was in the House of Commons. Scandal rocked the family when Graves committed suicide, supposedly because his wife was having an affair with the Duke of Cumberland although his wife had been living apart from her husband for some time. Woulfe was 12 when her father died. Lady Mary died when Graves was just 17.

== Career ==
In 1844, Woulfe became a Roman Catholic. She married the only son of Stephen Woulfe, Stephen Roland Woulfe on 9 June 1853, an eminent Irish catholic. They had no children. During their marriage her husband was both magistrate and high sheriff for County Clare. He lived locally at Tiermaclane.

Shortly before her death, Woulfe completed a sensation novel, Guy Vernon, including gypsies, scandals and two cases of bigamy. The reviews for the novel were given in 1869. The reviews were generally positive, suggesting that for a first novel from the author it was an excellent start. She died on 26 October 1870, aged 53.

== Works ==
- Guy Vernon. 3 vols. London: Hurst and Blackett, 1870.
