= Charles Mott-Radclyffe =

English politician (1911–1992)

Sir Charles Edward Mott-Radclyffe (25 December 1911 – 25 November 1992) was a Conservative Party politician in the United Kingdom.

He was the only son of Lt-Col Charles Edward Radclyffe DSO and Theresa Caroline Mott. Several generations of the Mott family had resided at Barningham Hall in North Barningham, Norfolk.

Mott-Radclyffe was educated at Eton College and Balliol College, Oxford and then joined the Diplomatic corps. He was elected as Member of Parliament (MP) for Windsor at a by-election in 1942 (where he faced a strong challenge from the Independent candidate William Douglas-Home), and served until he retired from the House of Commons at the 1970 general election.

He was knighted in 1957. He published a memoir in 1975 called Foreign Body in the Eye.

== Personal life ==
He lived on his family's Norfolk estate of Barningham Hall. He was married to Diana Gibbs from 1940 until her death in 1955. A year later he married Stella Constance Harrison, who died in 2011.

In June 2013, his eldest daughter, Theresa Caroline Courtauld died of a brain haemorrhage. She left behind two children and three grandchildren. She is buried next to her father at St Mary's, Barningham.

Parliament of the United Kingdom
Preceded by Annesley Somerville	Member of Parliament for Windsor; 1942–1970	Succeeded by Alan Glyn
