= East Cholderton =

Hamlet in Hampshire, England

Coordinates: 51.203576°N 1.573517°W

- Location within Hampshire
- OS grid reference: SU2989245016
- District: Test Valley
- Shire county: Hampshire
- Region: South East
- Country: England
- Sovereign state: United Kingdom
- Post town: ANDOVER
- Postcode district: SP11
- Dialling code: 01264
- Police: Hampshire and Isle of Wight
- Fire: Hampshire and Isle of Wight
- Ambulance: South Central
- UK Parliament: North West Hampshire

East Cholderton is a hamlet in the civil parish of Amport in the Test Valley district of Hampshire, England. Its nearest town is Andover which lies approximately 4.5 miles (6.7 km) east from the village, just off the A303 road.

== Notable residents ==
Lieutenant-General Sir John Elley MP KCB KCH KMT and KSG (1764 - 1839), a cavalry officer who fought with distinction in the Napoleonic Wars, lived and died at Cholderton Lodge.
