= Henry Richard Graves =

English painter

Henry Richard Graves (1818–1882) was an English portrait painter.

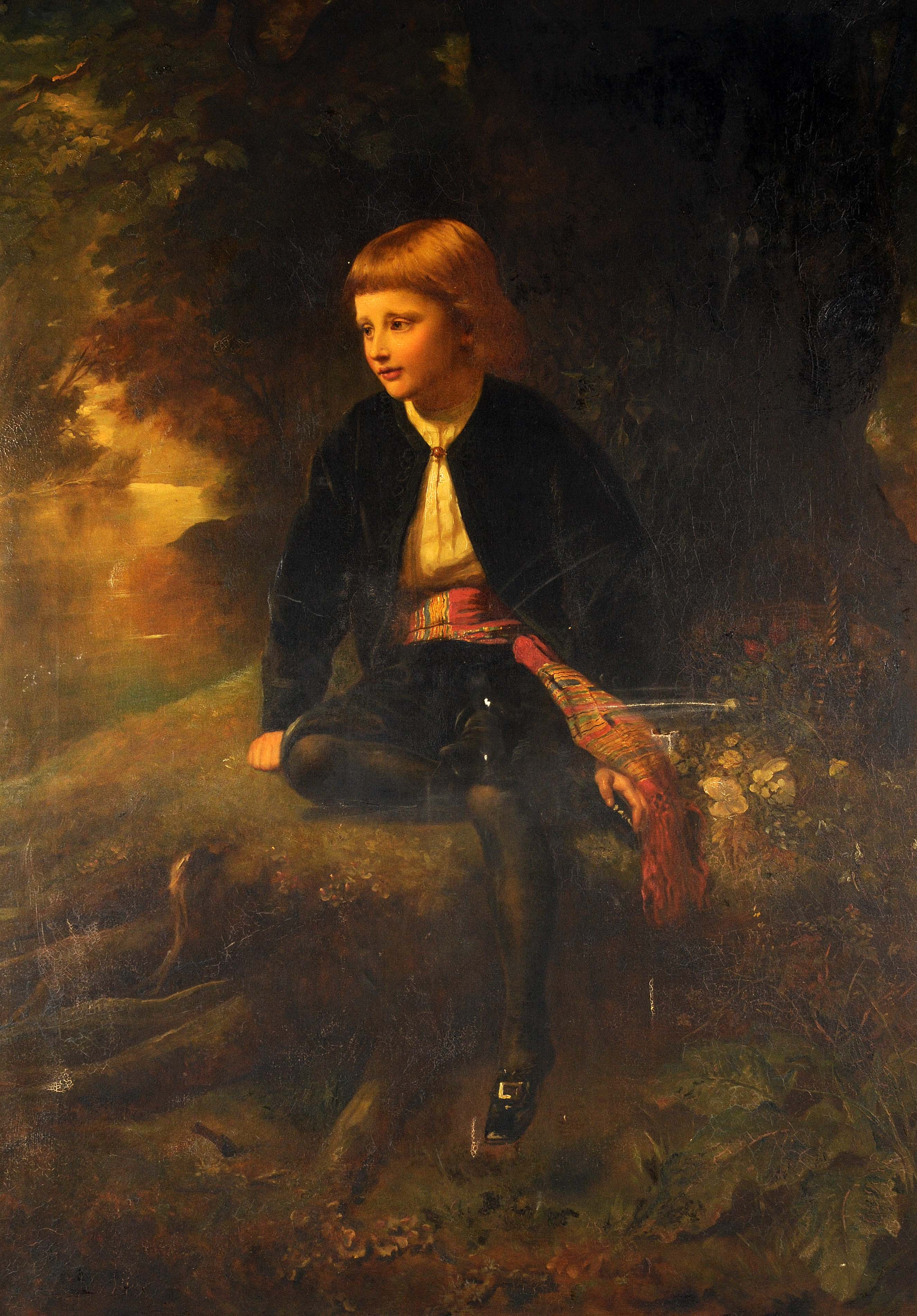
Portrait of Lawrence Challoner Garratt (1874), by Henry Richard Graves

Graves was the second son of Thomas Graves, 2nd Baron Graves, and worked as a clerk for the India Board in London. From 1847 he was a portrait painter in London, exhibiting 71 works at the Royal Academy.

Graves married Henrietta Wellesley in 1843 and had a large family.
