= 1942 Windsor by-election =

UK parliamentary by-election

The 1942 Windsor by-election, was a by-election held for the UK House of Commons constituency of Windsor in Berkshire on 30 June 1942. The by-election was won by the Conservative candidate Charles Mott-Radclyffe.

== Vacancy ==
The Conservative MP Annesley Somerville had died on 15 May 1942, aged 84. He had held the seat since the 1922 general election and had been returned unopposed in 1931 and 1935.

== Candidates ==
The Conservative candidate was 30-year-old Charles Mott-Radclyffe, who had not previously contested a parliamentary election.

During the Second World War, the political parties in the Coalition Government had agreed not to contest by-elections when a vacancy arose in any of the seats held by the other coalition parties. However, many by-elections were contested by independent or minor party candidates, and in Windsor William Douglas Home, the younger brother of the future Prime Minister Alec Douglas-Home, stood as an "Independent Progressive" candidate, opposing Winston Churchill's war aim of an unconditional surrender by Germany. Douglas-Home, a Second lieutenant in the Royal Armoured Corps, had previously contested the Glasgow Cathcart by-election in April 1942. He had supported appeasement in the 1930s.

Both candidates were in the army and had been schoolfriends at Eton.

== Result ==
On a low turnout, Mott-Radclyffe held the seat for the Conservatives, but with a majority of only 17%, a surprisingly good result for Douglas-Home. Mott-Radclyffe served as Windsor's MP until he retired from the House of Commons at the 1970 general election

Douglas-Home went on to contest the Clay Cross by-election in April 1944, where he came a poor third, and was later imprisoned for a year with hard labour after being court-martialled for refusing to fight in the attack on Le Havre after the allied forces had refused a German request to suspend hostilities to allow civilian evacuation.

Coincidentally, both candidates died in the same year, 1992, exactly 50 years after the by-election.

By-Election 30 June 1942: Windsor
Party	Candidate	Votes	%	±%
Conservative	Charles Mott-Radclyffe	9,557	58.37	N/A
Independent Progressive	William Douglas Home	6,817	41.63	New
Majority		2,740	16.74	N/A
Turnout		16,374	27.88	N/A
Conservative hold		Swing	N/A	
Registered electors		58,726		

== Previous result ==
General election 1935: Windsor
Party	Candidate	Votes	%	±%
Conservative	Annesley Somerville	Unopposed	N/A	N/A
Conservative hold				

== See also ==
- Windsor (UK Parliament constituency)
- Windsor, Berkshire
- List of United Kingdom by-elections (1931–1950)
