= Richard Warde =

16th-century politician

Sir Richard Warde (died 1578) was an English politician and royal official.

Richard was the son of Thomas Warde, the Porter, Controller of the Works and Keeper of the Armoury at Windsor Castle, by his wife, Maud, the daughter of Thomas Moore of Bourton in Buckinghamshire. In 1571, during the reign of Elizabeth I of England, he was elected the Member of Parliament for Berkshire, due to the support of Henry Norris, 1st Baron Norreys. He was also MP for Windsor a number of times, as well as being Cofferer of the Royal Household and Clerk of the Green Cloth. Like his father, he was Keeper of Cranbourne Lodge. He married Colubria, the daughter of William Flambert of Chertsey in Surrey, by whom he had seventeen children. They lived together at Hurst House in Berkshire. Sir Richard died on 11 February 1578 and is remembered by a memorial brass in Hurst Church. He was the great grandfather of Richard Harrison MP.
