= Sir Francis Barry, 1st Baronet =

British politician (1825–1907)

Barry in 1895.

Sir Francis Tress Barry, 1st Baronet, DL (8 June 1825 – 28 February 1907) was an English businessman who made his fortune from a copper mine in Portugal. Late in his life he became a Conservative Party politician, and sat in the Commons from 1890 to 1906.

== Early life ==
Barry was born on 8 June 1825, the eldest son of Charles Barry (1790–1866), of Orpington, Kent, a London ship broker and wharfinger, and his wife Harriet, daughter of Robert Ades, of Brede Place, Sussex. The Barry family owned the manor of Hampton Gay from 1544 to its sale in 1682, when the family settled in London and became merchants. Barry was educated in London at Camberwell Collegiate School. In 1851 he married Sarah Douglas, the daughter of Arthur Herron, of Northiam in Sussex. The couple had four sons and two daughters, and celebrated their golden wedding in 1901.

== Career ==
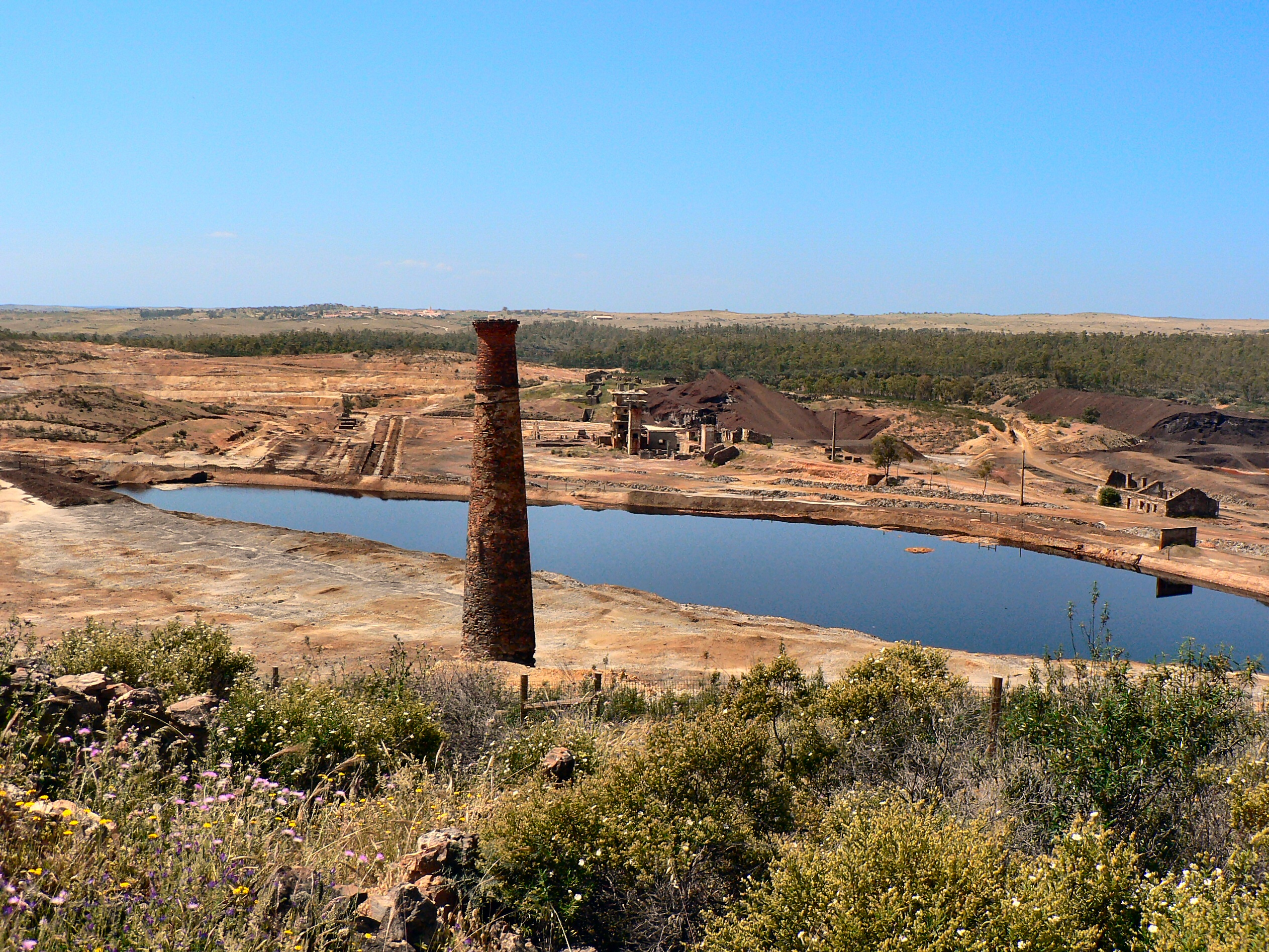
The Sao Domingos Mine in Portugal, owned by Barry's company Mason & Barry

Leaving school at the age of 16, Barry went to Spain to work in a business in Bilbao. He became the British vice-consul for the Biscay province in 1846, and the following year he served as temporary consul for the Biscay, Santander and Guipúzcoa provinces.

In the 1850s he was offered the post of consul in Madrid, but turned down the job to concentrate in his business interests. He returned to England, where he joined with his brother-in-law James Mason to take a 50-year lease on the Sao Domingos copper mine in Portugal. They switched production technique to opencast mining, and made large profits.

In 1863 was awarded the Order of Christ by King Luís I of Portugal, was promoted to Commander of that order in 1868, and ennobled as Baron de Barry in 1873. He also received the Cross of Naval Merit from the King of Spain.

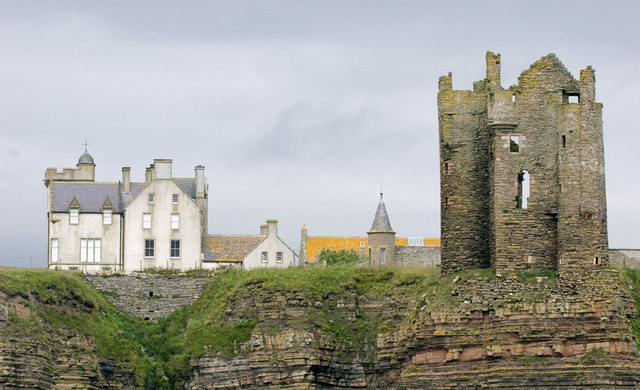
Barry's Scottish residence was Keiss Castle in Caithness

In 1872 he purchased a country estate: St Leonard's Hill near Windsor, Berkshire, which he used to lend to the Prince of Wales during Royal Ascot. He also owned Keiss Castle in Scotland, where he served as a Deputy Lieutenant of Caithness.

In around 1900 he excavated Nybster Broch, an Iron Age drystone structure, first excavated by Rev James Maxwell Joass in 1895. The site has been designated a scheduled monument.

== Politics ==
On 2 April 1890, Barry was elected at a by-election as the Member of Parliament (MP) for Windsor. He was made a baronet in 1899, and held the seat until he stood down from Parliament at the 1906 general election, when his nephew James Francis Mason was elected to succeed him.

He was also an Alderman of Berkshire County Council.

== Death ==
Barry died on 28 February 1907, at the age of 81, at his home St Leonard's Place. His estate was valued at probate at £640,270.

Parliament of the United Kingdom
Preceded by Robert Richardson-Gardner	Member of Parliament for Windsor; 1890–1906	Succeeded by James Mason
Baronetage of the United Kingdom
New creation	Baronet (of St Leonard's Hill and Keiss Castle); 1899–1907	Succeeded by Edward Arthur Barry
