= Richard Ramsbottom =

Richard Ramsbottom (1749–1813) was a British Tory politician, MP for New Windsor from 1806 until 1810, when he was succeeded by his nephew, John Ramsbottom.

He lived at Clewer Cottage, near Windsor, Berkshire.
