= Roger Eykyn (politician) =

British Liberal MP (1830-1896)

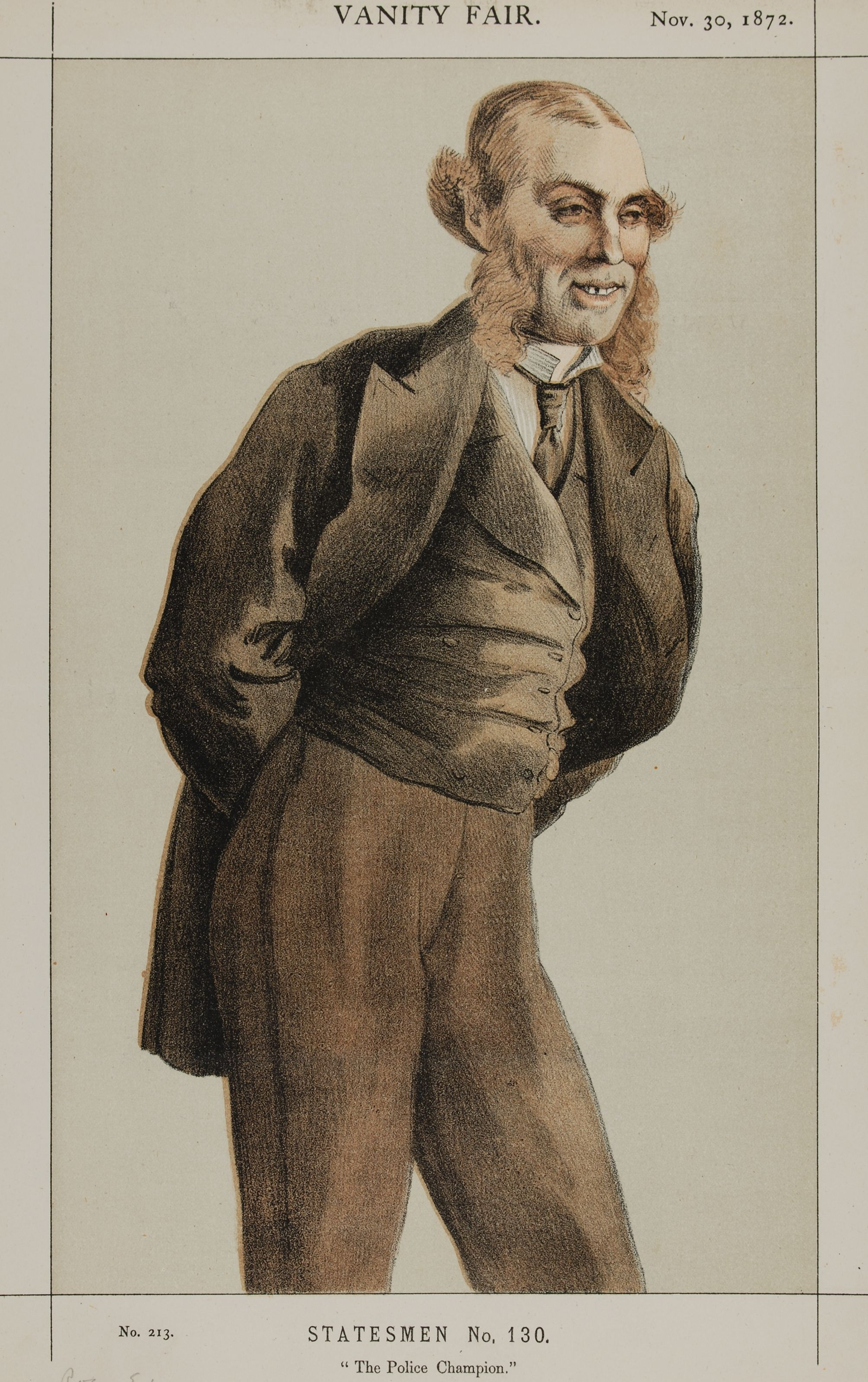
- Vanity Fair caricature of Eykyn by James Tissot

Member of Parliament for Windsor
- In office 1866–1874

Personal details
- Born: 21 October 1830
- Died: 14 November 1896 (aged 66)
- Spouses: Maria Prinald Schlotel; Mary Caroline Mostyn
- Parent(s): Richard Eykyn; Susanna Starr
- Occupation: Politician

Roger Eykyn (21 October 1830 – 14 November 1896) was an English Liberal Party politician who sat in the House of Commons from 1866 to 1874.

== Early life ==
Robert Eykyn was born on 21 October 1830. He was the son of Richard Eykyn of Crouch End, Middlesex, and Ackleton, Shropshire and his wife Susanna Starr, daughter of Sir William Starr, of Canterbury, Kent.

== Political career ==
Eykyn was a J.P. for Berkshire, and a cornet in the Royal Buckinghamshire Yeomanry Lancers. By 1877 he was a Captain in the Berkshire Yeomanry and resigned his commission on 7 April 1877.

In 1866 Eykyn was elected at a by-election as a member of parliament (MP) for Windsor after the return of the previous general election was declared void. He held the seat until his defeat at the 1874 general election.

== Personal life ==
Eykym married firstly Maria Prinald Schlotel (daughter of George Schlotel of Essex Lodge, Streatham, Surrey). She died in October 1866 and he married secondly in 1868, the Hon. Mary Caroline Mostyn (daughter of the 6th Baron Vaux of Harrowden).

== Death ==
Eykyn died at the age of 66.

Parliament of the United Kingdom
Preceded by Henry Labouchère; Sir Henry Ainslie Hoare, Bt	Member of Parliament for Windsor; 1866 – 1874; With: Charles Edwards to 1868	Succeeded by Robert Richardson-Gardner
