= Robert Richardson-Gardner =

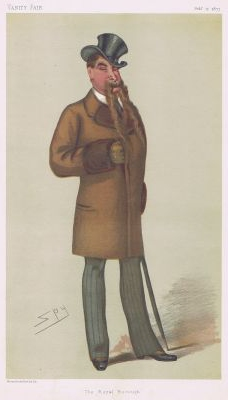
"The Royal Borough" Richardson-Gardner as caricatured by Spy (Leslie Ward) in Vanity Fair, February 1877

Robert Richardson-Gardner (15 June 1827 – 4 January 1898) was a British barrister, militia officer and Conservative politician who sat in the House of Commons from 1874 to 1890. He was also a Fellow of the Society of Antiquaries of London.

== Biography ==
Richardson-Gardner was born in Swansea, Glamorgan, the son of John and Elizabeth Richardson, and was called to the bar at the Middle Temple in 1853, although he did not practice as a barrister. His father and several of his brothers were shipowners and dock proprietors in Swansea, although the family originated in Northumberland.

He married Maria Louisa Gardner in 1854, only daughter and heiress of Henry Gardner, a wealthy brewer who, with his brothers, had owned the Cannon Brewery in St John Street, Clerkenwell, London. The couple adopted the surname Richardson-Gardner in 1865 by royal licence. In 1859 he was appointed Captain-Commandant of the newly formed 8th Hampshire Rifle Volunteers and in 1865 he was appointed Honorary Colonel of the 6th Tower Hamlets Rifle Volunteer Corps, a position he held until around 1872. Also in 1865 he was appointed a Deputy Lieutenant of Tower Hamlets.

At the 1868 general election, Richardson-Gardner stood unsuccessfully for Windsor. However he was elected Member of Parliament for the seat at the 1874 general election. On both occasions the unsuccessful candidate petitioned without success to have the result overthrown, citing bribery and corruption. He attended parliament infrequently and made one contribution during his time in the House of Commons. Shortly after his election he purchased an estate at Cowley Manor, Cheltenham, which he sold in 1882 and later lived at Ensbury Manor, Kinson, Dorset. Richardson-Gardner resigned his seat in 1890, after the death of his wife the previous year at Chateau Louis XIII, their spectacular home in Cannes, France. In 1892 he married the young actress, Rosalie Lilian Aurora Bernard, who unsuccessfully petitioned him for a divorce on the grounds of cruelty and adultery in 1894.

Richardson-Gardner also lived at 34 Grosvenor Square, 32 Park Lane, and 4 Ladbroke Square, all in London. He died at the Grand Hotel, Monte Carlo in 1898, aged 70.

Parliament of the United Kingdom
Preceded by Roger Eykyn	Member of Parliament for Windsor; 1874 – 1890	Succeeded by Francis Tress Barry
