= James Mason (British politician) =

British politician

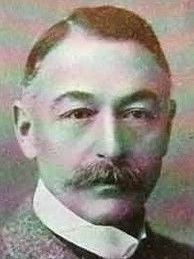

Member of Parliament for Windsor
- In office 12 January 1906 – 14 December 1918
- Preceded by: Francis Barry
- Succeeded by: Borough constituency abolished

Personal details
- Born: James Francis Mason; 28 August 1861
- Died: 2 April 1929 (aged 67)
- Resting place: St Mary's Church, North Leigh
- Party: Conservative

James Francis Mason (28 August 1861 – 2 April 1929) was a British Conservative politician who was the Member of Parliament for Windsor in Berkshire from 1906 to 1918.

Mason was the Unionist candidate in the 1919 Leyton West by-election.

Parliament of the United Kingdom
Preceded by Francis Barry	Member of Parliament for Windsor (Borough constituency); 1906–1918	Succeeded by Ernest Gardner as MP for Windsor (County constituency)
