= Windsor (constituency) =

UK Parliament constituency (1801–1974, 1997 onwards)

Coordinates: 51.44°N 0.60°W

- County constituency for the House of Commons
- Boundaries since 2024
- Boundary of Windsor in South East England
- County: Berkshire; Surrey
- Electorate: 74,338 (2023)
- Major settlements: Ascot, Datchet, Eton, Sunningdale, Windsor, Wraysbury, Virginia Water, Englefield Green

Current constituency
- Created: 1997
- Member of Parliament: Jack Rankin (Conservative)
- Seats: One
- Created from: Windsor & Maidenhead

1918–1974
- Seats: One
- Type of constituency: County constituency
- Replaced by: Windsor & Maidenhead

1424–1918
- Seats: Two until 1868, then one
- Type of constituency: Borough constituency

Windsor (/ˈwɪnzə/) is a constituency (Note: A county constituency (for the purposes of election expenses and type of returning officer).) represented in the House of Commons of the UK Parliament since 2024 by Jack Rankin of the Conservative Party. (Note: As with all constituencies in their modern form, the constituency elects one Member of Parliament (MP) by the first past the post system of election at least every five years, until 1868 the constituency as a parliamentary borough had the right to send two to most Parliaments.) It is in both Berkshire and Surrey.

Windsor has had parliamentary representation for centuries, first sending a member of parliament in 1301. In 1918, the Windsor parliamentary borough was abolished and absorbed into the new Windsor county seat. The constituency was re-created for the 1997 general election after it was abolished following the 1970 general election and replaced by the Windsor and Maidenhead constituency.

Its settlements include Ascot, Datchet, Eton, Sunningdale, Windsor (its namesake), Wraysbury, Virginia Water, as well as Englefield Green.

== Constituency profile ==
The constituency is centred on Windsor Great Park, covering the eponymous town of Windsor and various towns and villages in the Royal Borough of Windsor and Maidenhead and the Borough of Slough in Berkshire, and the Borough of Runnymede in Surrey.

The re-created constituency, from 1997, has continued a trend of large Conservative Party majorities. Post 2023 boundary changes, in local elections in the seat the major opposition party varies, with Labour strong in the Slough wards and Englefield Green, the Liberal Democrats in the town of Windsor itself, and independents in various villages. That said, affluent villages and small towns along the River Thames and around the Great Park have continued to contribute to large Conservative majorities, including Wraysbury and Ascot. In the 2024 general election, Labour came second to the Conservatives due to the changed composition of the seat in the boundary changes.

== History ==
Windsor has had parliamentary representation for centuries, formally known as the Parliamentary Borough of New Windsor, first sending a member in 1301, and continuously from 1424. It elected two members of parliament until 1868, when its representation was reduced to one MP. In 1918, the Parliamentary Borough was abolished and absorbed into the new county seat of Windsor, which also included large parts of the abolished Wokingham constituency.

In 1974, the constituency was abolished and replaced by Windsor and Maidenhead, although there were no changes to the boundaries. In 1997, the constituency was recreated when Windsor and Maidenhead was split into two separate seats.

The early political history of the area was strongly influenced by the monarch and members of his or her family. Windsor Castle has been an important royal residence throughout the history of the constituency.

=== 17th century ===
The pre-1832 franchise of the borough was held by inhabitants paying scot and lot (a local tax). On 2 May 1689 the House of Commons had decided that the electorate should be limited to the members of Windsor Corporation. This was disputed after the next election, in 1690, when the Mayor submitted two returns of different members. The House of Commons reversed the decision of the previous Parliament and confirmed the scot and lot franchise.

=== 18th century ===
There were 278 electors in 1712. Namier and Brooke estimated that, in 1754–1790, there were about 300 electors.

During part of the 18th century the Duke of Cumberland (son of King George II) and the Beauclerk family (descended from King Charles II) had political interests in the borough.

King George III became personally involved in the hotly contested 1780 general election. George encouraged local landowner Peniston Portlock Powney to stand by paying him £2,500 from the King's personal account. The King wished to defeat Admiral Keppel (later Viscount Keppel), an incumbent. The monarch went so far as to canvass tradesmen who dealt with the royal household. After this royal interference in the election, Keppel lost by a narrow 16 votes. Namier and Brooke suggest the Windsor electorate had an independent streak and were difficult to manage.

=== 19th century ===
In 1832 a new property based franchise replaced the scot and lot qualification. Under the new system, there were 507 registered electors in 1832. The borough representatives before the Reform Act 1832 included soldiers and people connected with the Royal Household, such as Sir Richard Hussey Vivian (MP 1826–1831) and Sir Herbert Taylor (MP 1820–1823). The constituency also returned politicians prominent in national politics, like the Duke of Wellington's elder brother the Earl of Mornington in the 1780s and 1790s or the future Prime Minister Edward Stanley (subsequently the Earl of Derby) in the early 1830s).

The Ramsbottom family filled one seat from 1806 until 1845. The borough had been loyal to the King's Pittite/Tory ministers in the late 18th and early 19th centuries, but became more favourable to the Whig interest after John Ramsbottom (MP 1810–1845) was elected.

By the 1860s the monarch had ceased to interfere in local affairs. The borough fell under the patronage of Colonel R. Richardson-Gardner. Richardson-Gardner was a local landowner, who caused some animosity when following the 1868 general election he evicted tenants who did not support him at the polls. This was the last Parliamentary election the Conservatives lost in Windsor.

Despite (or perhaps because of) his methods, Richardson-Gardner was elected to Parliament in 1874.

=== 20th century ===
Successive Conservative MPs, before the First World War, had considerable influence in the constituency; especially when they subscribed generously to local institutions such as a hospital.

The county division created in 1918 combined the town of Windsor, with territory to its west, south and east which had formerly been in the Wokingham division. The incumbent MP for Wokingham up to 1918, Ernest Gardner, was the first representative of the expanded Windsor constituency. The Conservative Party retained the seat continuously until its temporary abolition in 1974, as it has since its recreation in 1997.

== Boundaries and boundary changes ==
Map of 2010–2024 boundaries

=== Before 1868 ===
The parliamentary borough of New Windsor (Note: Sometimes known as New Windsor to distinguish it from the adjoining settlement of Old Windsor which was at the time still in Surrey) was based upon the easternmost town in Berkshire in South East England, which grew up around Windsor Castle and the narrowly defined electorate could also vote for the county representatives. The north boundary of the constituency was on the River Thames, which was then the border between Buckinghamshire which had a seat of the same name and Berkshire, likewise the rest of the borough adjoined the Berkshire county constituency.

=== 1868–1918 ===
The boundaries of the parliamentary borough were extended by the Parliamentary Boundaries Act 1868 (31 & 32 Vict., c. 46) to include the villages of Clewer and Eton (the latter then being in Buckinghamshire, north of the Thames).

Between 1885 and 1918 the seat to the north of the Thames was the Wycombe division of Buckinghamshire and the other neighbouring constituency was the Wokingham division of Berkshire.

=== 1918–1950 ===
The parliamentary borough was abolished by the Representation of the People Act 1918 and replaced by a county division named Windsor. The constituency comprised the local government areas (as they existed in 1918):

- The Municipal Boroughs of New Windsor and Maidenhead;
- the Rural Districts of Cookham, Easthampstead and Windsor; and
- Part of the Rural District of Wokingham.

The new constituency comprised the bulk of the abolished Wokingham division, including Maidenhead and rural areas surrounding Windsor and Maidenhead, but excluding the Municipal Borough of Wokingham itself, and incorporating the abolished Borough, with the exception of Eton, which was added to the Wycombe division of Buckinghamshire.

=== 1950–1974 ===
The constituency was reduced in size by the Representation of the People Act 1948, comprising:

- the Municipal Boroughs of New Windsor and Maidenhead; and
- the Rural Districts of Cookham and Windsor.

The Rural District of Easthampstead (which incorporated Bracknell) and the part of the Rural District of Wokingham were transferred to the re-established constituency of Wokingham.

For the February 1974 general election, the constituency was abolished and renamed Windsor and Maidenhead, with no changes to its boundaries; this area plus Eton, which was transferred from Buckinghamshire, became the Royal Borough of Windsor and Maidenhead established under the Local Government Act 1972.

=== 1997–2010 ===
For the 1997 general election, in order to effect an increase in Berkshire's representation from 7 to 8 MPs in accordance with the Fourth Periodic Review of Westminster Constituencies, the Windsor and Maidenhead constituency was abolished and two separate constituencies of Maidenhead and Windsor were created. The composition of the new constituency was:-

- The Borough of Bracknell Forest wards of Ascot, Cranbourne, and St Mary's;
- The Borough of Slough ward of Foxborough; and
- The Borough of Windsor and Maidenhead wards of Bray, Castle, Clewer North, Clewer South, Datchet, Eton North and South, Eton West, Horton and Wraysbury, Old Windsor, Park, Sunningdale and South Ascot, Sunninghill, and Trinity.

The majority of the electorate in the abolished constituency was included in Maidenhead, whilst Windsor was joined by Eton and Bray. It also included a ward of Slough Borough Council north of the Thames, which was transferred from the Borough Constituency of Slough, and was extended southwards to include a part of the abolished constituency of East Berkshire, including Ascot and Sunningdale.

In 1998 there was a small re-alignment of county boundaries in the north east corner of Berkshire. This transferred to the Borough of Slough a small polling district from Surrey and another from Buckinghamshire to form Colnbrook and Poyle. This new ward (since renamed Colnbrook with Poyle) was added to the Windsor constituency and was effective from the 2001 general election.

=== 2010–2024 ===
Further to the Fifth Periodic Review, the composition of the constituency is:-

- The Borough of Bracknell Forest wards of Ascot, Binfield with Warfield, Warfield Harvest Rise, and Winkfield and Cranbourne;
- The Borough of Slough ward of Colnbrook with Poyle; and
- The Borough of Windsor and Maidenhead wards of Ascot and Cheapside, Castle Without, Clewer East, Clewer North, Clewer South, Datchet, Eton and Castle, Eton Wick, Horton and Wraysbury, Old Windsor, Park, Sunningdale, Sunninghill and South Ascot.

The constituency gained the northern part of the constituency of Bracknell, including Binfield. Bray was transferred to Maidenhead and the Foxborough ward of the Borough of Slough returned to the Borough Constituency thereof.

=== 2024–present ===
Further to the 2023 Periodic Review of Westminster constituencies which became effective for the 2024 general election, the constituency is composed of the following (as they existed on 1 December 2020):

- The Borough of Runnymede wards of: Englefield Green East; Englefield Green West; Virginia Water.
- The Borough of Slough wards of: Colnbrook with Poyle; Foxborough; Langley Kedermister.^{1}
- The Royal Borough of Windsor and Maidenhead wards of: Ascot & Sunninghill; Clewer & Dedworth East; Clewer & Dedworth West; Clewer East; Datchet, Horton & Wraysbury; Eton & Castle; Old Windsor; Sunningdale & Cheapside.

The seat was expanded by adding two Borough of Slough wards from the Slough constituency and the communities of Englefield Green and Virginia Water from the Surrey constituency of Runnymede and Weybridge, thus creating a cross-county boundary seat. To compensate, the Bracknell Forest wards were transferred to Maidenhead, except the Warfield Harvest Ride ward, which went to Bracknell.

^{1} Following a local government boundary review which came into effect in May 2023, the parts in the Borough of Slough will now comprise the following wards from the 2024 general election:

- Colnbrook & Poyle; Langley Foxborough; Langley Marish (most); Langley St Mary's (small part).

== Members of Parliament ==
=== Burgesses in the English Parliament, 1510–1707 ===
As there were sometimes significant gaps between Parliaments held in this period, the dates of first assembly and dissolution are given. Where the name of the member has not yet been ascertained or (in the 16th century) is not recorded in a surviving document, the entry unknown is entered in the table.

The Roman numerals after some names are those used in The House of Commons 1509–1558 and The House of Commons 1558–1603 to distinguish a member from another politician of the same name.

Elected	Assembled	Dissolved	First member	Second member
1510	21 January 1510	23 February 1510	John Welles	William Pury
1512	4 February 1512	4 March 1514	John Welles	Thomas Rider
1515	5 February 1515	22 December 1515	John Welles	Thomas Rider
1523	15 April 1523	13 August 1523	unknown	unknown
1529	3 November 1529	14 April 1536	Thomas Warde	William Simonds
1536	8 June 1536	18 July 1536	unknown	unknown
1539	28 April 1539	24 July 1540	unknown	unknown
1542	16 January 1542	28 March 1544	Richard Warde	William Simonds
1545	23 November 1545	31 January 1547	Thomas Legh	unknown
1547	4 November 1547	15 April 1552	Richard Warde	Edward Weldon
By January 1552	4 November 1547	15 April 1552	Richard Warde	Thomas Little
1553	1 March 1553	31 March 1553	Richard Warde	Richard Amyce
1553	5 October 1553	5 December 1553	Richard Warde	Thomas Good
1554	2 April 1554	3 May 1554	Richard Warde	Thomas Butler II
1554	12 November 1554	16 January 1555	Richard Warde	William Norreys
1555	21 October 1555	9 December 1555	Richard Warde	William Norreys
14 January 1558	20 January 1558	17 November 1558	William Hanley	William Norreys
5 January 1559	23 January 1559	8 May 1559	Thomas Weldon	Roger Amyce
1562 or 1563	11 January 1563	2 January 1567	Richard Gallys	John Gresham
1571	2 April 1571	29 May 1571	John Thomson	Humphrey Michell
12 April 1572	8 May 1572	19 April 1583	Edmund Docwra	Richard Gallys
1576	8 May 1572	19 April 1583	Edmund Docwra	Humphrey Michell
16 November 1584	23 November 1584	14 September 1585	Henry Neville	John Croke III
28 September 1586	13 October 1586	23 March 1587	Henry Neville	George Woodward
10 October 1588	4 February 1589	29 March 1589	Henry Neville	Edward Hake
26 October 1588	4 February 1589	29 March 1589	Edward Neville I	Edward Hake
1593	18 February 1593	10 April 1593	Henry Neville	Edward Neville II
16 October 1597	24 October 1597	9 February 1598	Julius Caesar	John Norreys
1 October 1601	27 October 1601	19 December 1601	Julius Caesar	(Sir) John Norreys
1604	19 March 1604	9 February 1611	Samuel Backhouse	Thomas Durdent died and replaced by Sir Francis Howard
1614	5 April 1614	7 June 1614	Sir Richard Lovelace	Thomas Woodward
1621	16 January 1621	8 February 1622	Sir Charles Howard	Sir Robert Bennet
1624	12 February 1624	27 March 1625	Edmund Sawyer	Thomas Woodward died and replaced by Sir William Hewitt
1625	17 May 1625	12 August 1625	William Russell	Humphrey Newbury
1626	6 February 1626	15 June 1626	William Russell	Humphrey Newbury
1628	17 March 1628	10 March 1629	William Beecher	Thomas Hewett
	No parliament held			
1640	13 April 1640	5 May 1640	Sir Arthur Ingram	Sir Richard Harrison
1640	3 November 1640	5 December 1648	Cornelius Holland	William Taylor; Richard Winwood (1641)
1640	6 December 1648 (Note: Date of Pride's Purge, which converted the Long Parliament into the Rump Parliament)	20 April 1653 (Note: Date when Oliver Cromwell dissolved the Rump Parliament by force.)	Cornelius Holland	William Taylor; Richard Winwood (1641)
1653 (Note: Date when the members of the nominated or Barebones Parliament were selected. The parliamentary borough of Windsor was not represented in this body.)	4 July 1653	12 December 1653	unrepresented	unrepresented
1654 (Note: Date when the members of the First Protectorate Parliament were elected. The parliamentary borough of Windsor was not represented in this body. Windsor formed part of the county constituency of Berkshire for this Parliament.)	3 September 1654	22 January 1655	unrepresented	unrepresented
1656 (Note: Date when the members of the Second Protectorate Parliament were elected. The parliamentary borough of Windsor was not represented in this body. Windsor formed part of the county constituency of Berkshire for this Parliament.)	17 September 1656	4 February 1658	unrepresented	unrepresented
1659	27 January 1659	22 April 1659	George Starkey	Christopher Whichcote
N/A (Note: The Rump Parliament was recalled and subsequently Pride's Purge was reversed, allowing the full Long Parliament to meet until it agreed to dissolve itself.)	7 May 1659	20 February 1660	unknown	unknown
N/A	21 February 1660	16 March 1660	unknown	unknown
3 April 1660	25 April 1660	29 December 1660	Alexander Baker	Roger Palmer
9 April 1661	8 May 1661	24 January 1679	Sir Richard Braham	Thomas Higgons
19 February 1677	8 May 1661	24 January 1679	Sir Francis Winnington	Thomas Higgons
27 February 1679	6 March 1679	12 July 1679	Sir John Ernle	John Powney
5 April 1679	6 March 1679	12 July 1679	Richard Winwood	Samuel Starkey
29 August 1679	21 October 1680	18 January 1681	John Powney	John Carey
4 November 1680	21 October 1680	18 January 1681	Samuel Starkey	Richard Winwood
1681	21 March 1681	28 March 1681	Samuel Starkey	Richard Winwood
28 March 1685	19 May 1685	2 June 1687	William Chiffinch	Richard Graham
11 January 1689	22 January 1689	6 February 1690	Henry Powle	Sir Christopher Wren
23 May 1689	22 January 1689	6 February 1690	Henry Powle	Sir Algernon May
6 March 1690	20 March 1690	11 October 1695	Sir Christopher Wren	Baptist May
17 May 1690	20 March 1690	11 October 1695	Sir Charles Porter	William Adderley
20 November 1693	20 March 1690	11 October 1695	Sir Charles Porter	Sir William Scawen
23 October 1695	22 November 1695	6 July 1698	Sir William Scawen	The 4th Viscount Fitzhardinge
21 August 1698	24 August 1698	19 December 1700	The 4th Viscount Fitzhardinge	Richard Topham
3 January 1701	6 February 1701	11 November 1701	The 4th Viscount Fitzhardinge	Richard Topham
21 November 1701	30 December 1701	2 July 1702	The 4th Viscount Fitzhardinge	Richard Topham
16 August 1702	20 August 1702	5 April 1705	The 4th Viscount Fitzhardinge	Richard Topham
8 May 1705	14 June 1705	1707 (Note: The MPs of the last Parliament of England and 45 members co-opted from the former Parliament of Scotland, became the House of Commons of the 1st Parliament of Great Britain which assembled on 23 October 1707 (see below for the members in that Parliament).)	The 4th Viscount Fitzhardinge	Richard Topham

=== MPs 1707–1868 ===
Year	First member	First party	Second member	Second party
1707	John, Viscount Fitzhardinge		Richard Topham	
1710	William Paul (Note: Died in office, May 1711)		Richard Topham	
1711	Samuel Masham (Note: To the House of Lords as Lord Masham, January 1712)		Richard Topham	
1712	Charles Aldworth		Richard Topham	
1713	Charles Aldworth		Christopher Wren (Note: Not duly elected at 1715 general election)	
Jan. 1715	Robert Gayer		Christopher Wren	
Apr. 1715	Sir Henry Ashurst, Bt		Samuel Travers	
1722	Charles, Earl of Burford (Note: To the House of Lords, having succeeded to a dukedom, May 1726)		William, Earl of Inchiquin	
1726	Lord Vere Beauclerk		William, Earl of Inchiquin	
1727	Lord Vere Beauclerk		George, Viscount Malpas (Note: To the House of Lords, having succeeded to an earldom, May 1730)	
1733	Lord Vere Beauclerk		Lord Sidney Beauclerk (Note: Died November 1744)	
1741	Henry Fox		Lord Sidney Beauclerk	
1744	Henry Fox		Lord George Beauclerk	
1754	Henry Fox		Hon. John Fitzwilliam	
1761	Hon. Augustus Keppel		Hon. John Fitzwilliam	
Mar. 1768	Hon. Augustus Keppel		Lord George Beauclerk (Note: Died May 1768)	
May. 1768	Hon. Augustus Keppel		Richard Tonson (Note: Died 1772)	
1772	Hon. Augustus Keppel		Hon. John Hussey-Montagu	Tory
1780	Peniston Portlock Powney (Note: Died in office, January 1794)	Tory	Hon. John Hussey-Montagu	Tory
1787	Peniston Portlock Powney	Tory	The Earl of Mornington (Note: A peer of Ireland)	
1794	William Grant	Tory	The Earl of Mornington	
1796	Henry Isherwood (Note: Died in office, February 1796)	Tory	Hon. Robert Fulke Greville	Tory
1797	Sir William Johnston, Bt	Tory	Hon. Robert Fulke Greville	Tory
1802	John Williams (Note: Declared not duly elected)	Tory	Hon. Robert Fulke Greville	Tory
1804	Arthur Vansittart	Tory	Hon. Robert Fulke Greville	Tory
1806	Edward Disbrowe (Note: Died in office, February 1819)	Tory	Richard Ramsbottom (Note: Resigned, March 1810)	Tory
1810	Edward Disbrowe	Tory	John Ramsbottom, junior	Non Partisan
1812	Edward Disbrowe	Tory	John Ramsbottom, junior	Whig
1819	The Lord Graves	Tory	John Ramsbottom, junior	Whig
1820	Sir Herbert Taylor (Note: Resigned, February 1823)	Tory	John Ramsbottom, junior	Whig
1823	Edward Cromwell Disbrowe	Non Partisan	John Ramsbottom, junior	Whig
1826	Sir Hussey Vivian (Note: Resigned on appointment as Commander of Forces in Ireland, February 1831)	Non Partisan	John Ramsbottom, junior	Whig
1830	Sir Hussey Vivian	Whig	John Ramsbottom, junior	Whig
1831	Rt Hon. Edward Stanley	Whig	John Ramsbottom, junior	Whig
1832	Sir Samuel Pechell, Bt	Whig	John Ramsbottom, junior	Radical
1835	Sir John Edmund de Beauvoir (Note: Unseated on petition)	Radical	John Ramsbottom, junior	
1835	Sir John Elley (Note: Seated after a scrutiny)	Conservative	John Ramsbottom, junior	
1837	Robert Gordon	Whig	John Ramsbottom, junior	
1841	Ralph Neville	Conservative	John Ramsbottom, junior	
1845	Ralph Neville	Conservative	George Alexander Reid (Note: Died 1852)	Conservative
1847	Lord John Hay (Note: Resigned 1850)	Whig	George Alexander Reid	Conservative
1850	John Hatchell	Whig	George Alexander Reid	Conservative
1852	John Hatchell	Whig	Charles Grenfell	Whig
1852	Lord Charles Wellesley (Note: Resigned 1855)	Conservative	Charles Grenfell	Whig
1855	Samson Ricardo	Whig	Charles Grenfell	Whig
1857	William Vansittart (Note: Contested the 1865 general election as a Liberal candidate.)	Conservative	Charles Grenfell	Whig
1859	William Vansittart	Conservative	George William Hope (Note: Died 1863)	Conservative
1863	William Vansittart	Conservative	Richard Howard-Vyse	Conservative
1865	Sir Henry Hoare, Bt (Note: Election declared void on petition)	Liberal	Henry Labouchere	Liberal
1866	Charles Edwards	Liberal	Roger Eykyn	Liberal

=== MPs 1868–1974 ===
Election	Member	Party
1868	reduced to one member	
1868	Roger Eykyn	Liberal
1874	Robert Richardson-Gardner	Conservative
1890 by-election	Sir Francis Barry, Bt	Conservative
1906	James Mason	Conservative
1918	Ernest Gardner	Coalition Conservative
1922	Sir Annesley Somerville	Conservative
1942 by-election	Sir Charles Mott-Radclyffe	Conservative
1970	Alan Glyn	Conservative
Feb 1974	constituency abolished: see Windsor & Maidenhead	

=== MPs 1997–present ===
Election	Member	Party
1997	constituency created from Windsor and Maidenhead & East Berkshire	
1997	Michael Trend	Conservative
2005	Adam Afriyie	Conservative
2024	Jack Rankin	Conservative

== Elections ==
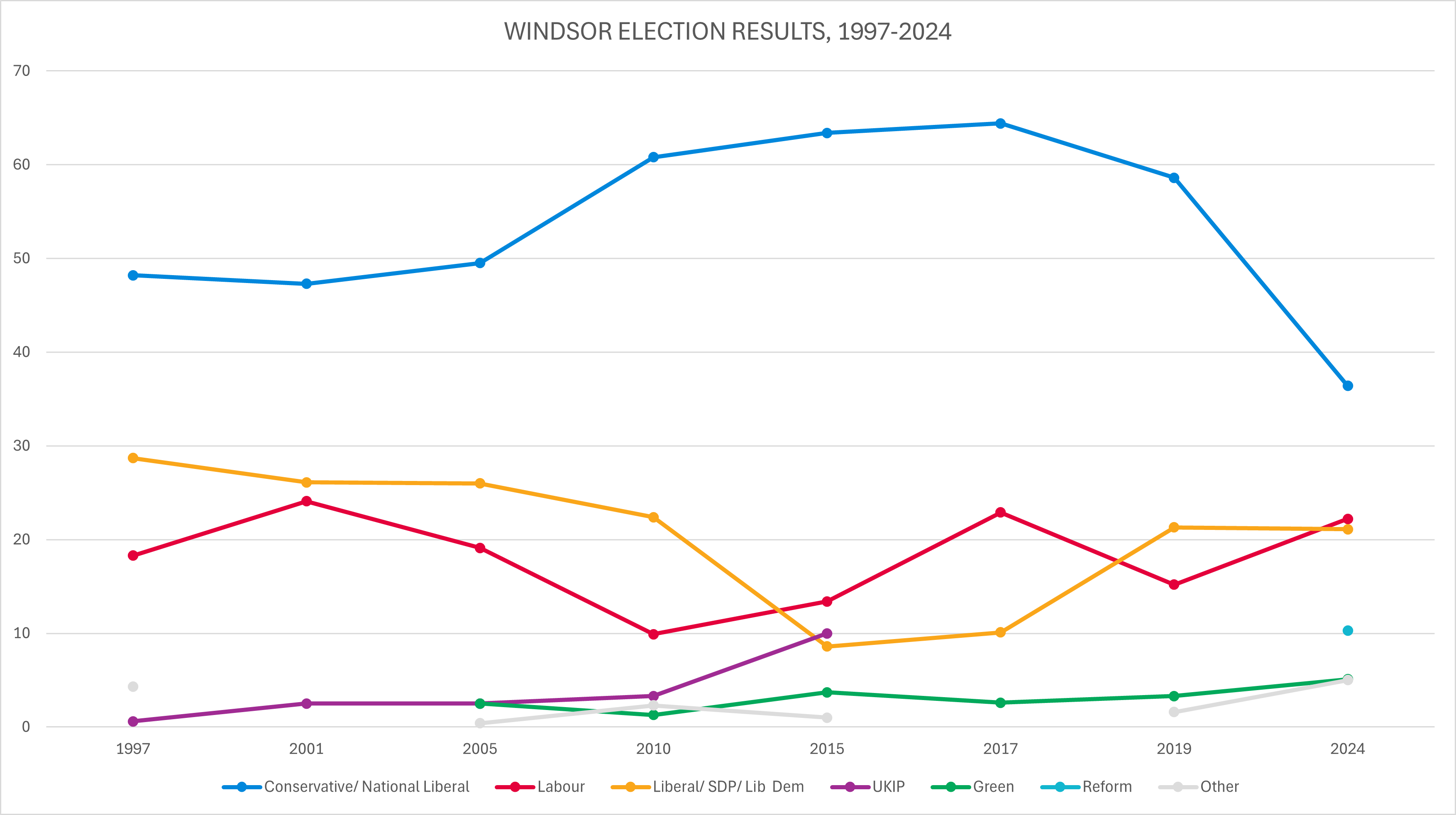
Election results 1997–2024

=== Elections in the 2020s ===
General election 2024: Windsor
Party	Candidate	Votes	%	±%
Conservative	Jack Rankin	16,483	36.4	−19.6
Labour	Pavitar Mann	10,026	22.2	+2.6
Liberal Democrats	Julian Tisi	9,539	21.1	+2.2
Reform	Harl Grewal	4,660	10.3	+10.0
Green	Michael Boyle	2,288	5.1	+1.6
Independent	David Buckley	1,629	3.6	+2.6
Workers Party	Simran Dhillon	621	1.4	N/A
Majority		6,457	14.3	−22.2
Turnout		45,246	61.7	−5.4
Registered electors		73,334		
Conservative hold		Swing	−11.1	

=== Elections in the 2010s ===
2019 notional result
Party	Vote	%
Conservative	28,036	56.0
Labour	9,780	19.6
Liberal Democrats	9,441	18.9
Green	1,729	3.5
Others	884	1.1
Brexit Party	152	0.3
Turnout	50,031	67.3
Electorate	74,338	

General election 2019: Windsor
Party	Candidate	Votes	%	±%
Conservative	Adam Afriyie	31,501	58.6	−5.8
Liberal Democrats	Julian Tisi	11,422	21.3	+11.2
Labour	Peter Shearman	8,147	15.2	−7.7
Green	Fintan McKeown	1,796	3.3	+0.7
Independent	David Buckley	508	0.9	N/A
Independent	Wisdom Da Costa	376	0.7	N/A
Majority		20,079	37.3	−4.2
Turnout		53,750	71.6	−1.7
Conservative hold		Swing	−4.2	

General election 2017: Windsor
Party	Candidate	Votes	%	±%
Conservative	Adam Afriyie	34,718	64.4	+1.0
Labour	Peter Shearman	12,334	22.9	+9.5
Liberal Democrats	Julian Tisi	5,434	10.1	+1.5
Green	Fintan McKeown	1,435	2.6	−1.1
Majority		22,384	41.5	−8.5
Turnout		53,921	73.3	+3.2
Conservative hold		Swing		

General election 2015: Windsor
Party	Candidate	Votes	%	±%
Conservative	Adam Afriyie	31,797	63.4	+2.6
Labour	Fiona Dent	6,714	13.4	+3.5
UKIP	Tariq Mailik	4,992	10.0	+7.7
Liberal Democrats	George Fussey	4,323	8.6	−13.8
Green	Derek Wall	1,834	3.7	+2.4
Independent	Wisdom Da Costa	500	1.0	N/A
Majority		25,083	50.0	+11.6
Turnout		50,160	70.1	−1.2
Conservative hold		Swing	+8.2	

General election 2010: Windsor
Party	Candidate	Votes	%	±%
Conservative	Adam Afriyie	30,172	60.8	+11.4
Liberal Democrats	Julian Tisi	11,118	22.4	−4.7
Labour	Amanjit Jhund	4,910	9.9	−8.0
UKIP	John-Paul Rye	1,612	3.3	+0.6
BNP	Peter Philips	950	1.9	N/A
Green	Derek Wall	628	1.3	−1.1
Independent	Peter Hooper	198	0.4	N/A
Majority		19,054	38.4	+16.1
Turnout		49,588	71.3	+7.2
Conservative hold		Swing	+8.1	

=== Elections in the 2000s ===
General election 2005: Windsor
Party	Candidate	Votes	%	±%
Conservative	Adam Afriyie	21,646	49.5	+2.2
Liberal Democrats	Antony Wood	11,354	26.0	−0.1
Labour	Mark Muller	8,339	19.1	−5.0
UKIP	David Black	1,098	2.5	0.0
Green	Derek Wall	1,074	2.5	N/A
Independent	Peter Hooper	182	0.4	N/A
Majority		10,292	23.5	+2.3
Turnout		43,691	65.4	+8.4
Conservative hold		Swing	+1.2	

General election 2001: Windsor
Party	Candidate	Votes	%	±%
Conservative	Michael Trend	19,900	47.3	−0.9
Liberal Democrats	Nick Pinfield	11,011	26.1	−2.6
Labour	Mark Muller	10,137	24.1	+5.8
UKIP	John Fagan	1,062	2.5	+1.9
Majority		8,889	21.2	+1.7
Turnout		42,110	57.0	−16.5
Conservative hold		Swing	+0.8	

=== Elections in the 1990s ===
General election 1997: Windsor
Party	Candidate	Votes	%	±%
Conservative	Michael Trend	24,476	48.2	−8.1
Liberal Democrats	Chris Fox	14,559	28.7	−0.4
Labour	Amanda Williams	9,287	18.3	+5.9
Referendum	James McDermott	1,676	3.3	N/A
Liberal	Paul Bradshaw	388	0.8	N/A
UKIP	E.Bigg	302	0.6	N/A
Dynamic	Ronald Parr	93	0.2	N/A
Majority		9,917	19.5	−7.7
Turnout		50,781	73.5	
Conservative hold		Swing	−3.9	

=== Elections in the 1970s ===
General election 1970: Windsor
Party	Candidate	Votes	%	±%
Conservative	Alan Glyn	32,264	58.9	+9.3
Labour	Timothy Sullivan	16,214	29.6	−3.9
Liberal	Robin Trevallion	6,343	11.6	−5.3
Majority		16,050	29.3	+13.2
Turnout		54,821	70.5	−5.8
Conservative hold		Swing	+6.6	

=== Elections in the 1960s ===
General election 1966: Windsor
Party	Candidate	Votes	%	±%
Conservative	Charles Mott-Radclyffe	25,630	49.6	−0.7
Labour	Roger R. Brown	17,300	33.5	+6.4
Liberal	Stephen Ronald Jakobi	8,744	16.9	−5.7
Majority		8,330	16.1	−7.1
Turnout		51,674	76.3	−0.1
Conservative hold		Swing	−3.5	

General election 1964: Windsor
Party	Candidate	Votes	%	±%
Conservative	Charles Mott-Radclyffe	25,274	50.3	−15.1
Labour	Peter A. Fletcher	13,652	27.1	−7.5
Liberal	Peter Gilmour Noto Badge	11,336	22.6	N/A
Majority		11,642	23.2	−7.6
Turnout		50,242	76.4	0.0
Conservative hold		Swing	−3.8	

=== Elections in the 1950s ===
General election 1959: Windsor
Party	Candidate	Votes	%	±%
Conservative	Charles Mott-Radclyffe	29,942	65.4	+2.0
Labour	William E. Robinson	15,864	34.6	−2.0
Majority		14,078	30.8	+4.0
Turnout		50,242	76.4	+1.1
Conservative hold		Swing	+2.0	

General election 1955: Windsor
Party	Candidate	Votes	%	±%
Conservative	Charles Mott-Radclyffe	25,390	63.4	+1.8
Labour	William O.J. Robinson	14,666	36.6	−1.8
Majority		10,724	26.8	+3.6
Turnout		40,056	73.3	−5.7
Conservative hold		Swing	+1.8	

General election 1951: Windsor
Party	Candidate	Votes	%	±%
Conservative	Charles Mott-Radclyffe	25,612	61.6	+6.0
Labour	Marjorie Nicholson	15,977	38.4	+4.6
Majority		9,635	23.2	+1.4
Turnout		41,589	79.0	−3.0
Conservative hold		Swing	+0.7	

General election 1950: Windsor
Party	Candidate	Votes	%	±%
Conservative	Charles Mott-Radclyffe	23,512	55.6	+1.4
Labour	Marjorie Nicholson	14,300	33.8	+0.7
Liberal	Alastair Mars	4,495	10.6	−2.2
Majority		9,212	21.8	+0.7
Turnout		42,307	82.0	+14.1
Conservative hold		Swing	+0.3	

=== Elections in the 1940s ===
General election 1945: Windsor
Party	Candidate	Votes	%	±%
Conservative	Charles Mott-Radclyffe	26,901	54.2	N/A
Labour	Marjorie Nicholson	16,420	33.1	N/A
Liberal	Neville Tufnell	6,331	12.8	N/A
Majority		10,481	21.1	N/A
Turnout		49,652	67.9	N/A
Conservative hold		Swing	N/A	

1942 Windsor by-election
Party	Candidate	Votes	%	±%
Conservative	Charles Mott-Radclyffe	9,557	58.4	N/A
Independent Progressive	William Douglas-Home	6,817	41.6	N/A
Majority		2,740	16.8	N/A
Turnout		16,374	27.9	N/A
Conservative hold		Swing	N/A	

=== Elections in the 1930s ===
General Election 1939/40

Another General Election was required to take place before the end of 1940. The political parties had been making preparations for an election to take place and by the Autumn of 1939, the following candidates had been selected;

- Conservative: Annesley Somerville
- Labour:

General election 1935: Windsor
Party	Candidate	Votes	%	±%
Conservative	Annesley Somerville	Unopposed		
Conservative hold				

General election 1931: Windsor
Party	Candidate	Votes	%	±%
Conservative	Annesley Somerville	Unopposed		
Conservative hold				

=== Elections in the 1920s ===
General election 1929: Windsor
Party	Candidate	Votes	%	±%
Unionist	Annesley Somerville	20,564	57.2	−21.5
Liberal	Ernest Haylor	11,314	31.5	N/A
Labour	Alfred Chilton	4,049	11.3	−10.0
Majority		9,250	25.7	−31.7
Turnout		35,927	67.6	+1.0
Unionist hold		Swing		

General election 1924: Windsor
Party	Candidate	Votes	%	±%
Unionist	Annesley Somerville	20,370	78.7	+20.3
Labour	Christopher Norman Birch Crisp	5,514	21.3	N/A
Majority		14,856	57.4	+40.6
Turnout		25,884	66.6	+9.5
Unionist hold		Swing		

General election 1923: Windsor
Party	Candidate	Votes	%	±%
Unionist	Annesley Somerville	12,648	58.4	−12.8
Liberal	Charles Birch Crisp	9,023	41.6	+12.8
Majority		3,625	16.8	−25.6
Turnout		21,671	57.1	−8.6
Unionist hold		Swing	+12.8	

General election 1922: Windsor
Party	Candidate	Votes	%	±%
Unionist	Annesley Somerville	17,504	71.2	+1.8
Liberal	Charles Birch Crisp	7,087	28.8	N/A
Majority		10,417	42.4	+3.6
Turnout		24,591	65.7	+22.2
Unionist hold		Swing		

=== Elections in the 1910s ===
General election 1918: Windsor
Party		Candidate	Votes	%	±%
C	Unionist	Ernest Gardner	10,073	69.4	+6.7
	Independent Labour	Charles Samuel Edgerley	4,448	30.6	N/A
Majority			5,625	38.8	+13.4
Turnout			14,521	43.5	−44.9
	Unionist hold		Swing		
C indicates candidate endorsed by the coalition government.

General Election 1914/15

Another General Election was required to take place before the end of 1915. The political parties had been making preparations for an election to take place and by July 1914, the following candidates had been selected;

- Unionist: James Francis Mason
- Liberal: James Alexander Browning

General election December 1910: Windsor
Party	Candidate	Votes	%	±%
Conservative	James Mason	1,779	62.7	+1.6
Liberal	Geoffrey Twisleton-Wykeham-Fiennes	1,057	37.3	−1.6
Majority		722	25.4	+3.2
Turnout		2,836	88.4	−5.3
Conservative hold		Swing	+1.6	

General election January 1910: Windsor
Party	Candidate	Votes	%	±%
Conservative	James Mason	1,838	61.1	+8.9
Liberal	Heber Hart	1,170	38.9	−8.9
Majority		668	22.2	+17.8
Turnout		3,008	93.7	+4.0
Conservative hold		Swing	+8.9	

=== Elections in the 1900s ===
General election 1906: Windsor
Party	Candidate	Votes	%	±%
Conservative	James Mason	1,504	52.2	N/A
Liberal	Clive Bigham	1,376	47.8	N/A
Majority		128	4.4	N/A
Turnout		2,880	89.7	N/A
Registered electors		3,210		
Conservative hold		Swing	N/A	

General election 1900: Windsor
Party	Candidate	Votes	%	±%
Conservative	Francis Barry	Unopposed		
Conservative hold				

=== Elections in the 1890s ===
Barry

General election 1895: Windsor
Party	Candidate	Votes	%	±%
Conservative	Francis Barry	Unopposed		
Conservative hold				

General election 1892: Windsor
Party	Candidate	Votes	%	±%
Conservative	Francis Barry	Unopposed		
Conservative hold				

By-election, 2 Apr 1890: Windsor
Party	Candidate	Votes	%	±%
Conservative	Francis Barry	1,522	61.0	N/A
Liberal	William Grenfell	972	39.0	N/A
Majority		550	22.0	N/A
Turnout		2,494	90.5	N/A
Registered electors		2,755		
Conservative hold		Swing	N/A	

- Caused by Richardson-Gardner's resignation.

=== Elections in the 1880s ===
General election 1886: Windsor
Party	Candidate	Votes	%	±%
Conservative	Robert Richardson-Gardner	Unopposed		
Conservative hold				

General election 1885: Windsor
Party	Candidate	Votes	%	±%
Conservative	Robert Richardson-Gardner	1,431	59.7	+5.0
Liberal	Henry Butler	966	40.3	−5.0
Majority		465	19.4	+10.0
Turnout		2,397	91.8	+6.1
Registered electors		2,612		
Conservative hold		Swing	+5.0	

=== Elections 1868–1880 ===
The bloc vote electoral system was used in two seat elections and first past the post for single member by-elections and general elections from 1868. Each voter had up to as many votes as there were seats to be filled. Votes had to be cast by a spoken declaration, in public, at the hustings (until the secret ballot was introduced in 1872).

General election 1880: Windsor
Party	Candidate	Votes	%	±%
Conservative	Robert Richardson-Gardner	995	54.7	−8.6
Liberal	Victor William Bates Van de Weyer	824	45.3	+8.6
Majority		171	9.4	−17.2
Turnout		1,819	85.7	−0.5
Registered electors		2,122		
Conservative hold		Swing	−8.6	

General election 1874: Windsor
Party	Candidate	Votes	%	±%
Conservative	Robert Richardson-Gardner	1,064	63.3	+13.6
Liberal	Roger Eykyn	618	36.7	−13.6
Majority		446	26.6	N/A
Turnout		1,682	86.2	−3.7
Registered electors		1,951		
Conservative gain from Liberal		Swing	+13.5	

General election 1868: Windsor
Party	Candidate	Votes	%	±%
Liberal	Roger Eykyn	803	50.3	−28.6
Conservative	Robert Richardson-Gardner	795	49.7	+28.6
Majority		8	0.6	−2.1
Turnout		1,598	89.9	−1.4
Registered electors		1,777		
Liberal hold		Swing	−28.6	

=== Elections 1690–1866 ===
Note on percentage change calculations: Where there was only one candidate of a party in successive elections, for the same number of seats, change is calculated on the party percentage vote. Where there was more than one candidate, in one or both successive elections for the same number of seats, then change is calculated on the individual percentage vote.

Note on sources: The information for the election results given below is taken from Cruickshanks et al. 1690–1715, Sedgwick 1715–1754, Namier and Brooke 1754–1790, Stooks Smith 1790–1832 and from Craig thereafter. Where Stooks Smith gives additional information or differs from the other sources this is indicated in a note after the result. When a candidate is described as Non Partisan for an election this means that the sources used do not give a party label. This does not necessarily mean that the candidate did not regard himself as a member of a party or acted as such in Parliament. Craig's party labels have been varied to take account of the development of parties. Tory candidates are classified as Conservative from the 1835 United Kingdom general election. Whig and Radical candidates are classified separately until the formal establishment of the Liberal Party shortly after the 1859 United Kingdom general election.

1690s – 1700s – 1710s – 1720s – 1730s – 1740s – 1750s – 1760s – 1770s – 1780s – 1790s – 1800s – 1810s – 1820s – 1830s – 1840s – 1850s – 1860s

==== Elections in the 1860s ====
By-Election 9 May 1866: Windsor (2 seats)
Party	Candidate	Votes	%	±%
Liberal	Charles Edwards	Unopposed		
Liberal	Roger Eykyn	Unopposed		
Liberal hold				
Liberal hold				

- Caused by the previous election being declared void on petition after both Hoare and Labouchere were found guilty of bribery via their agents.

General election 1865: Windsor (2 seats)
Party	Candidate	Votes	%	±%
Liberal	Henry Hoare	324	27.2	N/A
Liberal	Henry Labouchere	323	27.2	N/A
Liberal	William Vansittart	291	24.5	N/A
Conservative	Richard Howard-Vyse	251	21.1	−49.6
Majority		32	2.7	N/A
Turnout		595 (est)	91.3 (est)	+22.3
Registered electors		651		
Liberal gain from Conservative		Swing		
Liberal gain from Conservative		Swing		

- Note (1865): Turnout is estimated, in the same way as for 1857. This election was declared void on petition.

By-Election 4 November 1863: Windsor
Party	Candidate	Votes	%	±%
Conservative	Richard Howard-Vyse	287	54.9	−15.8
Liberal	Arthur Hayter	236	45.1	+15.8
Majority		51	9.8	+7.1
Turnout		523	84.5	+15.5
Registered electors		619		
Conservative hold		Swing	−15.8	

- Caused by Hope's death.

==== Elections in the 1850s ====
General election 1859: Windsor (2 seats)
Party	Candidate	Votes	%	±%
Conservative	William Vansittart	325	38.7	+20.6
Conservative	George William Hope	269	32.0	+13.9
Liberal	Charles Grenfell	246	29.3	−34.6
Majority		23	2.7	−1.3
Turnout		420 (est)	69.0 (est)	−1.1
Registered electors		609		
Conservative hold		Swing	+19.0	
Conservative gain from Liberal		Swing	+15.6	

- Note (1859): Turnout estimated as in 1857. A petition was presented after this election, but it was withdrawn before a formal decision was made upon it.

General election 1857: Windsor (2 seats)
Party	Candidate	Votes	%	±%
Conservative	William Vansittart	325	36.1	−8.4
Whig	Charles Grenfell	289	32.1	+3.5
Whig	Samson Ricardo	286	31.8	+4.9
Majority		36	4.0	+1.8
Turnout		450 (est)	70.1 (est)	+15.2
Registered electors		642		
Conservative hold		Swing	−8.4	
Whig hold		Swing	+3.9	

- Note (1857): As the number of electors who voted is unascertained, the minimum turnout is calculated by dividing the number of votes by two. To the extent that voters did not use both their votes the turnout figure will be an underestimate.

By-election, 14 February 1855: Windsor
Party	Candidate	Votes	%	±%
Whig	Samson Ricardo	Unopposed		
Whig gain from Conservative				

- Resignation of Wellesley

General election 1852: Windsor (2 seats)
Party	Candidate	Votes	%	±%
Conservative	Charles Wellesley	241	30.8	N/A
Whig	Charles Grenfell	224	28.6	N/A
Whig	Samson Ricardo	210	26.9	N/A
Conservative	Thomas Bulkeley	107	13.7	N/A
Turnout		391 (est)	54.9 (est)	N/A
Registered electors		712		
Majority		17	2.2	N/A
Conservative hold		Swing	N/A	
Majority		14	1.7	N/A
Whig hold		Swing	N/A	

- Note (1852): A petition was presented against Wellesley only, but it was dismissed.

By-election, 22 May 1852: Windsor
Party	Candidate	Votes	%	±%
Whig	Charles Grenfell	330	58.9	N/A
Conservative	Arthur Vansittart	230	41.1	N/A
Majority		100	17.8	N/A
Turnout		560	78.7	N/A
Registered electors		712		
Whig gain from Conservative		Swing	N/A	

- Seat vacated on Reid's death

By-election, 10 February 1851: Windsor
Party	Candidate	Votes	%	±%
Whig	John Hatchell	Unopposed		
Whig hold				

- Seat vacated on appointment of Hatchell as Attorney-General for Ireland

By-election, 6 February 1850: Windsor
Party	Candidate	Votes	%	±%
Whig	John Hatchell	Unopposed		
Whig hold				

- Hay's resignation

==== Elections in the 1840s ====
General election 1847: Windsor (2 seats)
Party	Candidate	Votes	%	±%
Whig	John Hay	Unopposed		
Conservative	George Alexander Reid	Unopposed		
Registered electors		728		
Whig hold				
Conservative hold				

- Note (1847): Stooks Smith has the registered electorate as 720.

By-election, 14 March 1846: Windsor
Party	Candidate	Votes	%	±%
Conservative	Ralph Neville	Unopposed		
Conservative hold				

- Caused by Neville's appointment as a Lord Commissioner of the Treasury

By-election, 8 November 1845: Windsor
Party	Candidate	Votes	%	±%
Conservative	George Alexander Reid	Unopposed		
Conservative gain from Whig				

- Caused by Ramsbottom's death

General election 1841: Windsor (2 seats)
Party	Candidate	Votes	%	±%
Whig	John Ramsbottom	316	30.9	−3.8
Conservative	Ralph Neville	311	30.4	+15.5
Whig	William Frederick Ferguson	265	25.9	−5.2
Radical	John Edmund de Beauvoir	130	12.7	−6.7
Turnout		555	86.4	+13.7
Registered electors		642		
Majority		5	0.5	−11.2
Whig hold		Swing	−5.8	
Majority		46	4.5	N/A
Conservative gain from Whig		Swing	+12.3	

- Note (1841): Later in his career Ralph Neville became known as Ralph Neville Grenville. A petition was presented challenging this election, but it was withdrawn before a decision was obtained.

==== Elections in the 1830s ====
General election 1837: Windsor (2 seats)
Party	Candidate	Votes	%	±%
Whig	John Ramsbottom	326	34.7	+13.3
Whig	Robert Gordon	292	31.1	+9.7
Radical	John Edmund de Beauvoir	182	19.4	−9.6
Conservative	Thomas Bulkeley (19th century MP)	140	14.9	−13.2
Majority		110	11.7	−2.2
Turnout		511	72.7	−17.2
Registered electors		703		
Whig hold		Swing	+13.3	
Whig gain from Radical		Swing	+9.7	

General election 1835: Windsor (2 seats)
Party	Candidate	Votes	%	±%
Whig	John Ramsbottom	353	42.9	−32.8
Radical	John Edmund de Beauvoir	239	29.0	+4.7
Conservative	John Elley	231	28.1	N/A
Turnout		453	89.9	−1.0
Registered electors		504		
Majority		114	13.9	+10.9
Whig hold		Swing	−18.8	
Majority		8	0.9	N/A
Radical gain from Whig		Swing	+18.8	

- On petition de Beauvoir was unseated and Elley was seated on 6 April 1835, following a scrutiny.
- Note (1835): John Walter was a candidate, but he retired from the contest before the election.

General election 1832: Windsor (2 seats)
Party	Candidate	Votes	%
Whig	John Ramsbottom	408	48.4
Whig	Samuel Pechell	230	27.3
Radical	John de Beauvoir	205	24.3
Majority		25	3.0
Turnout		461	90.9
Registered electors		507	
Whig hold			
Whig hold			

Note (1832): Stooks Smith classified Ramsbottom as a Radical candidate from this election. However as Stenton, editing a book composed of Parliamentary biographies published by a contemporary after the Reform Act 1832, described Ramsbottom as being 'of Whig principles' he continues to be classified as a Whig in this article.

General election 1831: Windsor (2 seats)
Party	Candidate	Votes	%
Whig	John Ramsbottom	Unopposed	
Whig	Edward Stanley	Unopposed	
Registered electors		650	
Whig hold			
Whig hold			

By-election, 10 February 1831: Windsor
Party	Candidate	Votes	%
Whig	Edward Stanley	Unopposed	
Registered electors		650	
Whig hold			

- Seat vacated on the appointment of Vivian as Commander of the Forces in Ireland

General election 1830: Windsor (2 seats)
Party	Candidate	Votes	%
Whig	John Ramsbottom	Unopposed	
Whig	Hussey Vivian	Unopposed	
Whig hold			
Whig gain from Nonpartisan			

==== Elections in the 1820s ====
General election 1826: Windsor (2 seats)
Party	Candidate	Votes	%	±%
Whig	John Ramsbottom	Unopposed	N/A	N/A
Non Partisan	Hussey Vivian	Unopposed	N/A	N/A

By-Election February 1823: Windsor
Party	Candidate	Votes	%	±%
Non Partisan	Edward Cromwell Disbrowe	Unopposed	N/A	N/A
Nonpartisan gain from Tory				

- Resignation of Taylor

General election 1820: Windsor (2 seats)
Party	Candidate	Votes	%	±%
Whig	John Ramsbottom	Unopposed	N/A	N/A
Tory	Herbert Taylor	Unopposed	N/A	N/A

- Note (1820): From this election Stooks Smith does not append junior to the name of John Ramsbottom.

==== Elections in the 1810s ====
By-Election February 1819: Windsor
Party	Candidate	Votes	%	±%
Tory	Thomas Graves	Unopposed	N/A	N/A
Tory hold				

- Death of Disbrowe

General election 1818: Windsor (2 seats)
Party	Candidate	Votes	%	±%
Tory	Edward Disbrowe	Unopposed	N/A	N/A
Whig	John Ramsbottom, junior	Unopposed	N/A	N/A

General election 1812: Windsor (2 seats)
Party	Candidate	Votes	%	±%
Tory	Edward Disbrowe	Unopposed	N/A	N/A
Whig	John Ramsbottom, junior	Unopposed	N/A	N/A

By-Election March 1810: Windsor
Party	Candidate	Votes	%	±%
Non Partisan	John Ramsbottom, junior	Unopposed	N/A	N/A
Nonpartisan gain from Tory				

- Resignation of Ramsbottom

==== Elections in the 1800s ====
General election 1807: Windsor (2 seats)
Party	Candidate	Votes	%	±%
Tory	Edward Disbrowe	Unopposed	N/A	N/A
Tory	Richard Ramsbottom	Unopposed	N/A	N/A

General election 1806: Windsor (2 seats)
Party	Candidate	Votes	%	±%
Tory	Edward Disbrowe	200	39.14	N/A
Tory	Richard Ramsbottom	162	31.70	+0.64
Tory	Arthur Vansittart	149	29.16	N/A
Majority		13	2.64	−6.56
Turnout		511		N/A

By-Election 1804: Windsor
Party	Candidate	Votes	%	±%
Tory	Arthur Vansittart	200	55.10	N/A
Tory	Anthony Bacon (candidate)	163	44.90	N/A
Majority		37	10.20	N/A
Turnout		363	N/A	N/A
Tory hold		Swing		

- Seat vacated when Williams was declared not duly elected

General election 1802: Windsor (2 seats)
Party	Candidate	Votes	%	±%
Tory	John Williams	212	35.22	N/A
Tory	Robert Fulke Greville	203	33.72	N/A
Tory	Richard Ramsbottom	187	31.06	N/A
Majority		16	2.66	N/A
Turnout		602	N/A	N/A

By-Election April 1800: Windsor
Party	Candidate	Votes	%	±%
Tory	Robert Fulke Greville	Unopposed	N/A	N/A
Tory hold				

- Seat vacated on the appointment of Greville as a Groom of the Bedchamber

==== Elections in the 1790s ====
By-Election February 1797: Windsor
Party	Candidate	Votes	%	±%
Tory	William Johnson	141	81.50	N/A
Non Partisan	William Vining Perry	32	18.50	N/A
Majority		109	63.00	N/A
Turnout		173	N/A	N/A
Tory hold		Swing	N/A	

- Death of Isherwood

General election 1796: Windsor (2 seats)
Party	Candidate	Votes	%	±%
Tory	Henry Isherwood	Unopposed	N/A	N/A
Tory	Robert Fulke Greville	Unopposed	N/A	N/A

By-Election 1794: Windsor
Party	Candidate	Votes	%	±%
Tory	William Grant	151	51.89	N/A
Tory	Henry Isherwood	140	48.11	N/A
Majority		11	3.78	N/A
Turnout		291	N/A	N/A
Tory hold		Swing	N/A	

- Death of Powney

General election 1790: Windsor (2 seats)
Party	Candidate	Votes	%	±%
Tory	Peniston Powney	Unopposed	N/A	N/A
Non Partisan	Richard Wellesley	Unopposed	N/A	N/A

==== Elections in the 1780s ====
By-Election 1 July 1788: Windsor
Party	Candidate	Votes	%	±%
Tory	Peniston Powney	Unopposed	N/A	N/A
Tory hold		Swing	N/A	

- Seat vacated on the appointment of Powney as Ranger of the Little Park.

By-Election 19 July 1787: Windsor
Party	Candidate	Votes	%	±%
Non Partisan	Richard Wellesley	Unopposed	N/A	N/A
Nonpartisan gain from Tory		Swing	N/A	

- Death of Hussey-Montagu
- Note (1787): Lord John Russell was a candidate, but declined going to the poll.

General election 31 March 1784: Windsor (2 seats)
Party	Candidate	Votes	%	±%
Tory	John Hussey-Montagu	Unopposed	N/A	N/A
Tory	Peniston Powney	Unopposed	N/A	N/A

- Note (1784): Richard Pennant was proposed, but declined going to the poll.

General election 8 September 1780: Windsor (2 seats)
Party	Candidate	Votes	%	±%
Tory	John Hussey-Montagu	214	36.51	N/A
Tory	Peniston Powney	174	35.90	N/A
Whig	Augustus Keppel	158	27.59	N/A
Turnout		546	N/A	N/A

==== Elections in the 1770s ====
General election 8 October 1774: Windsor (2 seats)
Party	Candidate	Votes	%	±%
Whig	Augustus Keppel	Unopposed	N/A	N/A
Tory	John Hussey-Montagu	Unopposed	N/A	N/A

By-Election 9 November 1772: Windsor
Party	Candidate	Votes	%	±%
Tory	John Hussey-Montagu	Unopposed	N/A	N/A
Tory gain from Nonpartisan		Swing	N/A	

- Death of Tonson.
- Note (1772): Both Stooks Smith and Napier & Brooke refer to this MP as the Hon. John Montagu.

==== Elections in the 1760s ====
By-Election 18 May 1768: Windsor
Party	Candidate	Votes	%	±%
Non Partisan	Richard Tonson	Unopposed	N/A	N/A
Non Partisan hold		Swing	N/A	

- Death of Beauclerk.

General election 16 March 1768: Windsor (2 seats)
Party	Candidate	Votes	%	±%
Non Partisan	Augustus Keppel	Unopposed	N/A	N/A
Non Partisan	George Beauclerk	Unopposed	N/A	N/A

By-Election 23 December 1765: Windsor
Party	Candidate	Votes	%	±%
Non Partisan	Augustus Keppel	Unopposed	N/A	N/A
Non Partisan hold		Swing	N/A	

- Seat vacated on the appointment of Keppel to an office.

General election 25 March 1761: Windsor (2 seats)
Party	Candidate	Votes	%	±%
Non Partisan	John Fitzwilliam	Unopposed	N/A	N/A
Non Partisan	Augustus Keppel	Unopposed	N/A	N/A

==== Elections in the 1750s ====
By-Election 5 July 1757: Windsor
Party	Candidate	Votes	%	±%
Non Partisan	Henry Fox	137	61.43	N/A
Non Partisan	Charles Bowles	86	38.57	N/A
Majority		51	23.86	N/A
Turnout		223	N/A	N/A
Non Partisan hold		Swing	N/A	

- Seat vacated on the appointment of Fox as Paymaster of the Forces.

By-Election 19 November 1755: Windsor
Party	Candidate	Votes	%	±%
Non Partisan	Henry Fox	Unopposed	N/A	N/A
Non Partisan hold		Swing	N/A	

- Seat vacated on the appointment of Fox as Secretary of State for the Southern Department.

General election 13 April 1754: Windsor (2 seats)
Party	Candidate	Votes	%	±%
Non Partisan	Henry Fox	Unopposed	N/A	N/A
Non Partisan	John Fitzwilliam	Unopposed	N/A	N/A

==== Elections in the 1740s ====
General election 26 June 1747: Windsor (2 seats)
Party	Candidate	Votes	%	±%
Non Partisan	George Beauclerk	Unopposed	N/A	N/A
Non Partisan	Henry Fox	Unopposed	N/A	N/A

By-Election 31 May 1746: Windsor
Party	Candidate	Votes	%	±%
Non Partisan	Henry Fox	Unopposed	N/A	N/A
Non Partisan hold		Swing	N/A	

- Seat vacated on the appointment of Fox as Secretary at War.

By-Election 3 December 1744: Windsor
Party	Candidate	Votes	%	±%
Non Partisan	George Beauclerk	Unopposed	N/A	N/A
Non Partisan hold		Swing	N/A	

- Death of Beauclerk

By-Election 26 December 1743: Windsor
Party	Candidate	Votes	%	±%
Non Partisan	Henry Fox	Unopposed	N/A	N/A
Non Partisan hold		Swing	N/A	

- Seat vacated on the appointment of Fox to an office.

General election 2 May 1741: Windsor (2 seats)
Party	Candidate	Votes	%	±%
Non Partisan	Sidney Beauclerk	Unopposed	N/A	N/A
Non Partisan	Henry Fox	Unopposed	N/A	N/A

By-Election 28 April 1740: Windsor
Party	Candidate	Votes	%	±%
Non Partisan	Sidney Beauclerk	Unopposed	N/A	N/A
Non Partisan hold		Swing	N/A	

- Seat vacated on the appointment of Lord Sidney Beauclerk as Vice-Chamberlain of the Household.

==== Elections in the 1730s ====
By-Election 10 March 1738: Windsor
Party	Candidate	Votes	%	±%
Non Partisan	Vere Beauclerk	133	50.00	N/A
Non Partisan	Richard Oldfield	133	50.00	N/A
Majority		0	0.00	N/A
Turnout		266	N/A	N/A

- Seat vacated after the appointment of Lord Vere Beauclerk to an office.
- A double return was made. The House of Commons decided the correct result was Beauclerk 240 (60.00%) and Oldfield 160 (40.00%); a majority of 80 (20.00%). Beauclerk was declared duly elected on 27 March 1738.

General election 23 April 1734: Windsor (2 seats)
Party	Candidate	Votes	%	±%
Non Partisan	Vere Beauclerk	Unopposed	N/A	N/A
Non Partisan	Sidney Beauclerk	Unopposed	N/A	N/A

By-Election 16 May 1733: Windsor
Party	Candidate	Votes	%	±%
Non Partisan	Sidney Beauclerk	Unopposed	N/A	N/A
Non Partisan hold		Swing	N/A	

- Succession of Malpas as the 3rd Earl of Cholmondeley

By-Election 15 May 1732: Windsor
Party	Candidate	Votes	%	±%
Non Partisan	Vere Beauclerk	Unopposed	N/A	N/A
Non Partisan hold		Swing	N/A	

- Seat vacated on the appointment of Beauclerk as a Commissioner of the Navy.

==== Elections in the 1720s ====
General election 16 August 1727: Windsor (2 seats)
Party	Candidate	Votes	%	±%
Non Partisan	Vere Beauclerk	247	45.40	N/A
Non Partisan	George Cholmondeley	244	44.85	N/A
Non Partisan	Francis Oldfield	53	9.74	N/A
Turnout		544	N/A	N/A

By-Election 31 May 1726: Windsor
Party	Candidate	Votes	%	±%
Non Partisan	Vere Beauclerk	Unopposed	N/A	N/A
Non Partisan hold		Swing	N/A	

- Succession of Burford as the 2nd Duke of St Albans.

General election 20 March 1722: Windsor (2 seats)
Party	Candidate	Votes	%	±%
Non Partisan	Charles Beauclerk	249	45.86	N/A
Non Partisan	William O'Brien	211	38.86	N/A
Non Partisan	Proctor	80	14.73	N/A
Non Partisan	Robert Gayer	3	0.55	−24.40
Turnout		543	N/A	N/A

==== Elections in the 1710s ====
General election 26 January 1715: Windsor (2 seats)
Party	Candidate	Votes	%	±%
Tory	Christopher Wren	141	25.68	N/A
Tory	Robert Gayer	137	24.95	N/A
Whig	Henry Ashurst	136	24.77	N/A
Whig	Samuel Travers	135	24.59	N/A
Turnout		549	N/A	N/A

- On petition, Wren and Gayer were unseated and Ashurst and Travers were seated on 14 April 1715.

General election 24 August 1713: Windsor (2 seats)
Party	Candidate	Votes	%	±%
Tory	Christopher Wren	244	48.51	N/A
Tory	Charles Aldworth	183	36.38	N/A
Whig	Henry Ashurst	76	15.11	N/A
Turnout		503	N/A	N/A

By-Election 21 January 1712: Windsor
Party	Candidate	Votes	%	±%
Tory	Charles Aldworth	149	78.42	N/A
Whig	Topham Foot	41	21.58	N/A
Majority		108	56.84	N/A
Turnout		190	N/A	N/A
Tory hold		Swing	N/A	

- Masham created the 1st Lord Masham 1 January 1712

By-Election 18 May 1711: Windsor
Party	Candidate	Votes	%	±%
Tory	Samuel Masham	Unopposed	N/A	N/A
Tory hold		Swing	N/A	

- Death of Paul

General election 4 October 1710: Windsor (2 seats)
Party	Candidate	Votes	%	±%
Non Partisan	Richard Topham	Unopposed	N/A	N/A
Tory	William Paul	Unopposed	N/A	N/A

==== Elections in the 1700s ====
General election 3 May 1708: Windsor (2 seats)
Party	Candidate	Votes	%	±%
Whig	John Berkeley	Unopposed	N/A	N/A
Non Partisan	Richard Topham	Unopposed	N/A	N/A

General election 8 May 1705: Windsor (2 seats)
Party	Candidate	Votes	%	±%
Whig	John Berkeley	Unopposed	N/A	N/A
Non Partisan	Richard Topham	Unopposed	N/A	N/A

General election 16 August 1702: Windsor (2 seats)
Party	Candidate	Votes	%	±%
Whig	John Berkeley	Unopposed	N/A	N/A
Non Partisan	Richard Topham	Unopposed	N/A	N/A

General Election 21 November 1701: Windsor (2 seats)
Party	Candidate	Votes	%	±%
Whig	John Berkeley	Unopposed	N/A	N/A
Non Partisan	Richard Topham	Unopposed	N/A	N/A

General Election 3 January 1701: Windsor (2 seats)
Party	Candidate	Votes	%	±%
Whig	John Berkeley	Unopposed	N/A	N/A
Non Partisan	Richard Topham	Unopposed	N/A	N/A

==== Elections in the 1690s ====
General election 21 July 1698: Windsor (2 seats)
Party	Candidate	Votes	%	±%
Whig	John Berkeley	Elected	N/A	N/A
Non Partisan	Richard Topham	Elected	N/A	N/A
Non Partisan	William Scawen	Defeated	N/A	N/A
Turnout		Unknown	N/A	N/A

General election 23 October 1695: Windsor (2 seats)
Party	Candidate	Votes	%	±%
Whig	John Berkeley	Unopposed	N/A	N/A
Non Partisan	William Scawen	Unopposed	N/A	N/A

By-Election 20 November 1693: Windsor
Party	Candidate	Votes	%	±%
Non Partisan	William Scawen	Unopposed	N/A	N/A
Non Partisan hold		Swing	N/A	

- Death of Adderley, in June 1693

General election 6 March 1690: Windsor (2 seats)
Party	Candidate	Votes	%	±%
Non Partisan	Christopher Wren	Elected	N/A	N/A
Non Partisan	Baptist May	Elected	N/A	N/A
Non Partisan	Charles Porter	Defeated	N/A	N/A
Non Partisan	William Adderley	Defeated	N/A	N/A
Turnout		Unknown	N/A	N/A

- Note: There is a discrepancy between sources, as The House of Common 1690–1715 indicates that Wren was elected at this election; whereas Leigh Rayment indicates Sir Algernon May was re-elected; both with Baptist May.
- On petition, Wren and May were unseated and Porter and Adderley were seated on 17 May 1690.

== See also ==
- List of parliamentary constituencies in Berkshire
- List of parliamentary constituencies in the South East England (region)
- 1942 Windsor by-election

== Sources ==
- A Chronological Register of Both Houses of the British Parliament. Robert Beatson, 1807.
- Boundaries of Parliamentary Constituencies 1885–1972, compiled and edited by F.W.S. Craig (Parliamentary Reference Publications 1972)
- British Parliamentary Election Results 1832–1885, compiled and edited by F.W.S. Craig (Macmillan Press 1977)
- British Parliamentary Election Results 1885–1918, compiled and edited by F.W.S. Craig (Macmillan Press 1974)
- British Parliamentary Election Results 1918–1949, compiled and edited by F.W.S. Craig (Macmillan Press, revised edition 1977)
- British Parliamentary Election Results 1950–1973, compiled and edited by F.W.S. Craig (Parliamentary Research Services 1983).
- The House of Commons 1690–1715, by Eveline Cruickshanks, Stuart Handley and D.W. Hayton (Cambridge University Press 2002)
- The House of Commons 1715–1754, by Romney Sedgwick (HMSO 1970)
- The House of Commons 1754–1790, by Sir Lewis Namier and John Brooke (HMSO 1964)
- Social Geography of British Elections 1885–1910, by Henry Pelling (Macmillan 1967)
- The Parliaments of England by Henry Stooks Smith (1st edition published in three volumes 1844–50), second edition edited (in one volume) by F.W.S. Craig (Political Reference Publications 1973))
- Who's Who of British members of parliament: Volume I 1832–1885, edited by M. Stenton (The Harvester Press 1976)
- Who's Who of British members of parliament, Volume II 1886–1918, edited by M. Stenton and S. Lees (Harvester Press 1978)
- Who's Who of British members of parliament, Volume III 1919–1945, edited by M. Stenton and S. Lees (Harvester Press 1979)
- Who's Who of British members of parliament, Volume IV 1945–1979, edited by M. Stenton and S. Lees (Harvester Press 1981)
