= List of mayors of Windsor, England =

This is a list of mayors of Windsor, Berkshire, England.

- William Pury: mayor 1518–19, 1522-3
- Thomas Ryther: mayor 1512, 1524–5.
- William Shipley: mayor 1903
