= John Welles (MP for Windsor) =

English politician

Member of the parliament of England for New Windsor
- In office 1510–1515

Personal details
- Born: by 1485
- Died: 1515/18 New Windsor, Berkshire
- Occupation: Member of Parliament

John Welles (by 1485 – 1515/18), of New Windsor, Berkshire, was an English member of parliament.

He was a member (MP) of the parliament of England for New Windsor in 1510, 1512 and 1515. Little is known of his life, but no children were mentioned in his will.
