= Charles Aldworth =

Charles Aldworth (1677 - 21 September 1714) was an English politician, MP for New Windsor from 1712 to 1714.

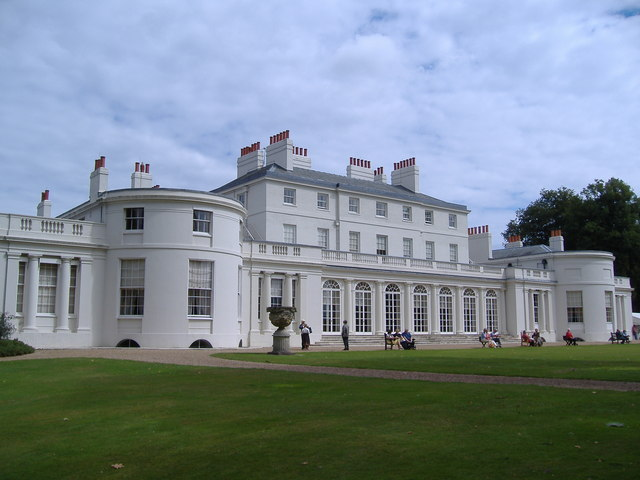
Frogmore House, Old Windsor

Charles Aldworth was the son of the King's Auditor, William Aldworth of Frogmore House at Windsor in Berkshire, and his wife, Anne. He was the cousin of Richard Aldworth of Stanlake Park, paternal grandfather of Richard Aldworth, 2nd Baron Braybrooke. In 1700 Charles succeeded his father, who had secured a long lease on Frogmore, but was forced to move out with his two sisters in 1709.

Aldworth was educated at King's College, Cambridge, matriculating there in 1693, after which he studied law at the Inner Temple, where he was called to the bar in 1703. Recommended by the Duke of Northumberland, he was returned as MP for New Windsor in 1712. He sat as MP until his 1714 death in a duel: Colonel Chudleigh, a whig army officer, accused Aldworth of Jacobitism and profited from Aldworth's physical disability by shooting him dead in the duel which followed. He was unmarried and had provided for his unmarried sisters by selling part of his inheritance.
