= Thomas Ryther =

British politician

Thomas Ryther or Rider, (by 1479 – 1525 or later), of New Windsor, Berkshire, was an English Member of Parliament (MP).

He was a Member of the Parliament of England for New Windsor 4 March 1514, 5 February 1515 and 22 December 1515. He was Mayor of Windsor, Berkshire 1512, 1524–5.
