= Edward Disbrowe =

English soldier and politician

Edward Disbrowe (1754–1818) was an English soldier and politician.

== Early life and family ==
Disbrowe was the son of George Disbrowe and Margaret Vaughan. He came from an old Northamptonshire family descended from John Desborough, a Parliamentarian officer during the English Civil War, and his wife Jane Cromwell, a sister of Oliver Cromwell. He was the first of his family to be established at Walton-on-Trent, where he inherited an estate in 1773.

== Offices and positions ==
While serving as an officer in the Staffordshire Militia at Windsor, Disbrowe became a friend of the king. This led to a variety of royal appointments, including Equerry to George III, Vice-Chamberlain to Queen Charlotte, and Master of St Katharine's by the Tower. His regiment was given the title of the King's Own (1st Staffordshire) Militia, and was thereafter frequently on duty at Windsor Castle, Kew Palace, or at Weymouth when the Royal Family was in residence. Disbrowe's brother-in-law, Robert Hobart, the Colonial Secretary, provided Disbrowe with a sinecure to help support his family finances.

Disbrowe represented Windsor in Parliament from 1806 until his death. His career was marked by punctual attendance, generally silent support for the government, and opposition to Catholic relief. While serving as MP, he was the first to inform ministers of the king's impending relapse into insanity in 1810, which would lead to the regency of the Prince of Wales.

== Marriage and children ==
He married Charlotte Hobart, daughter of George Hobart, 3rd Earl of Buckinghamshire; she predeceased him in 1798. They had six children, among them Edward Cromwell Disbrowe, MP for Windsor, and Charlotte Albina Disbrowe, who married Herbert Taylor, Edward's successor as Master of St. Katharine's.
