= Richard Topham =

English landowner and politician

Richard Topham (1671–1730) was an English landowner and politician, Member of Parliament for New Windsor from 1698 to 1713. He is known also as a collector.

== Life ==
He was son of John Topham, acting as serjeant-at-arms of the House of Commons from 1678 until his death in 1692 (for Sir William Bishop) and his wife Joan Stoughton. He was educated at Eton College, and matriculated at Trinity College, Oxford in 1689. On his father's death, he was unable to nominate the successor. Turning away from a possible legal career, he managed land holdings in New Windsor.

Topham was elected to the House of Commons for New Windsor in 1698, and was identified as a Country Party supporter. His parliamentary interests were mainly constituency concerns, and private bills. In 1707, he persuaded William Petyt, the Keeper of Records in the Tower of London, who was ill and died that year, to pass to him the post. He retired from politics in 1713.

As Keeper of the Records, Topham attracted early criticism for his lack of relevant experience. He deflected it by giving deputy status to George Holmes; and by administrative innovation.

== Collector ==
Topham was a bibliophile and collector in his own right. His library, dominated by Latin and Greek classics, amounted to some 1300 books. His so-called "paper museum", of drawings, watercolours and prints, reached 3000 items. Among those were 53 drawings by Pompeo Batoni.

The evidence is not convincing that Topham made a Grand Tour. He used agents to build up his collection, in particular John Talman. He owned a large house in Peascod Street, Windsor. There he had a collection of classical statuary.

== Family ==
Topham did not marry. His mother Joan, who died in 1721, lived with him in Peascod Street. Sidney Beauclerk lived with them, for a period, from around age 15 (c. 1718), when he went to Eton.

Topham's sister Annabella married Thomas Reeve, who died in 1737. Via Reeve, Topham's heir was Beauclerk.

== Legacy ==
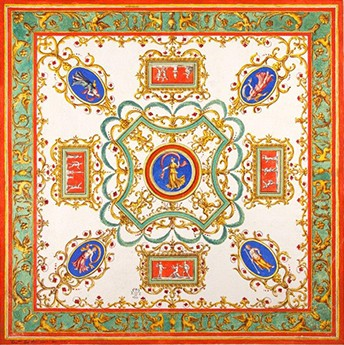
Drawing of ornamental ceiling from the Topham Collection, by Francesco Bartoli

The Topham Collection of prints and drawings went to Eton College. It is now understood that Robert Adam's ideas on neo-classical interior decoration, evolved in the 1760s, were influenced directly by graphical work of Francesco Bartoli in this collection. Charles Cameron is also believed to have made use of the works, without acknowledgement.
