= John Ramsbottom (MP) =

British Whig politician

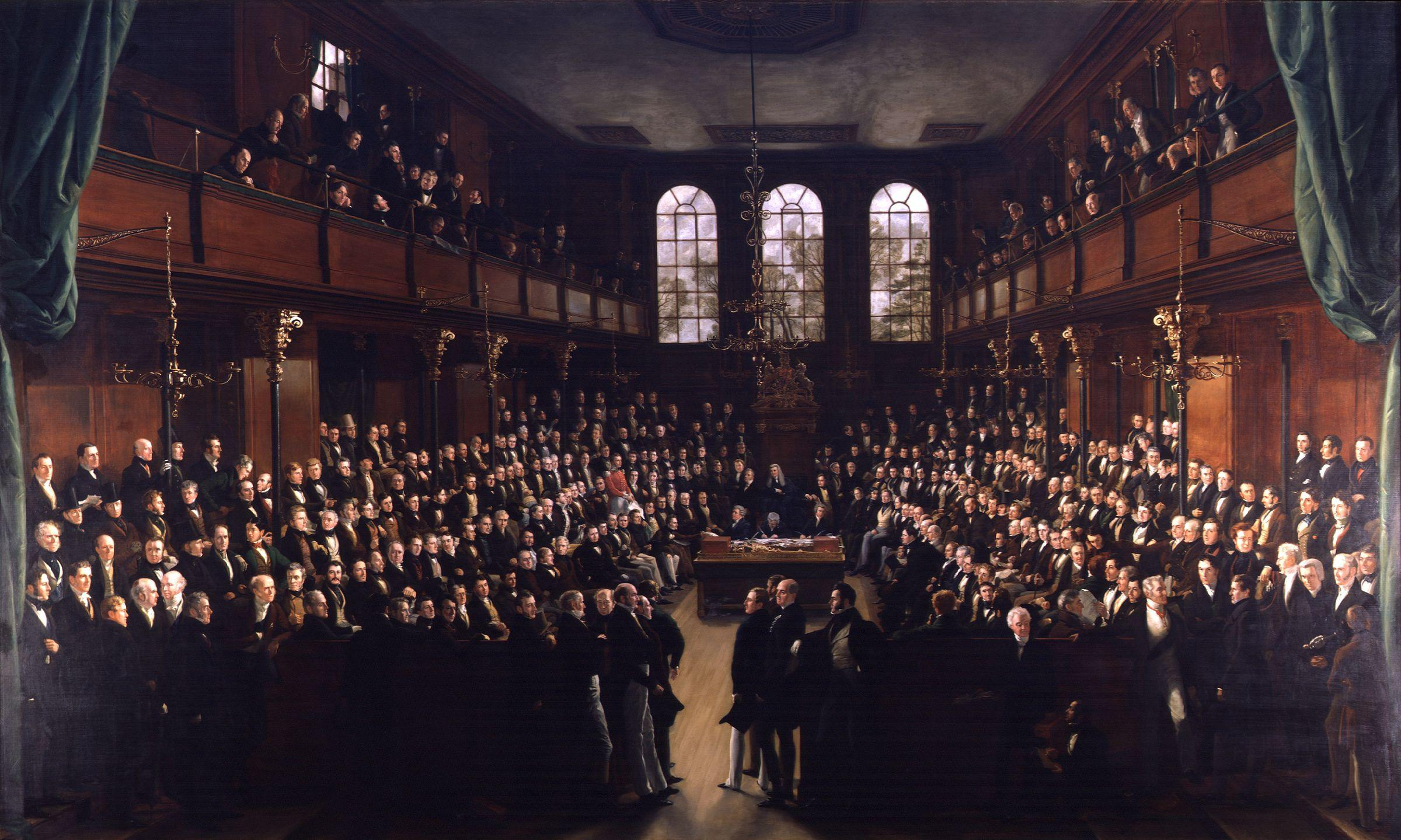
The House of Commons, 1833, by Sir George Hayter

John Ramsbottom (1778–1845) was a British Whig politician and landowner, MP for New Windsor from 1810 until his death in 1845.

In 1810, he succeeded his uncle Richard Ramsbottom as MP for the constituency of New Windsor.

He lived at Clewer Lodge and Woodside, Windsor, Berkshire.
