= Sir Edmund Monson, 1st Baronet =

British diplomat (1834–1909)

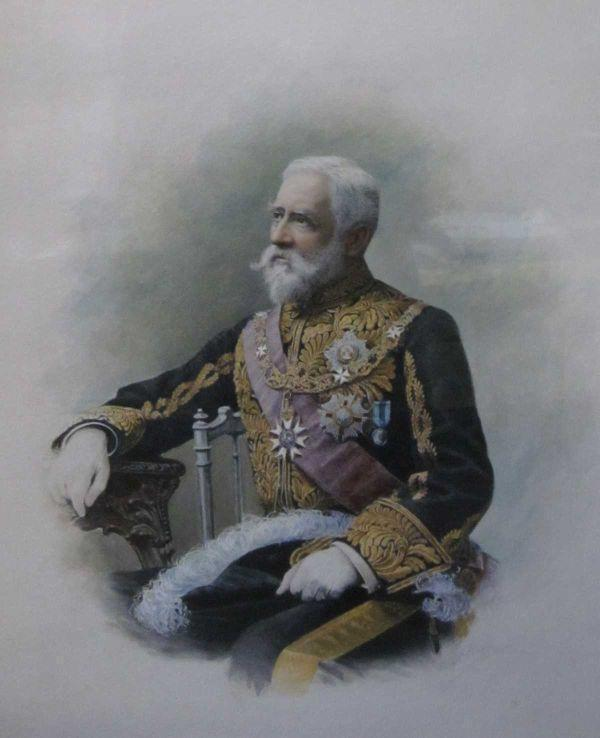
Portrait of Sir Edmund Monson, 1st Baronet, by Eugene Picou (1831- 1914)

Sir Edmund John Monson, 1st Baronet, GCB, GCMG, GCVO, PC (6 October 1834 – 28 October 1909), misspelled in some sources as Edward Monson, was a British diplomat who was minister or ambassador to several countries.

== Background and education ==
The Hon. Edmund John Monson was born at Seal, Kent, the third son of William Monson, 6th Baron Monson, and Eliza Larken Monson. He was educated at Eton College and then Balliol College, Oxford, graduating in 1855, and was elected as a Fellow of All Souls College, Oxford in 1858.

== Diplomatic career ==
Monson entered the British diplomatic service in 1856 and was posted as an unpaid attaché to the embassy in Paris, where Lord Cowley, the ambassador, called him "one of the best and most intelligent attachés he ever had". This secured him an appointment as private secretary to Lord Lyons, the newly appointed British Ambassador to the United States late in 1858. Monson was trained in the diplomatic service by Lord Lyons, and was a member of the Tory-sympathetic 'Lyons School' of British diplomacy. Monson then transferred to Hanover and later to Brussels as Third Secretary, but left the diplomatic service in 1865 to stand for Parliament, failing to get elected as Member of Parliament for Reigate.

Monson returned to the diplomatic service in 1869, being appointed Consul in the Azores in 1869, Consul-General in Budapest in 1871 and Second Secretary in Vienna; and to other posts, including as a special envoy in Dalmatia and Montenegro in 1876–1877.

In 1879, he was sent as minister-resident and consul-general in Uruguay, where he served until 1884. In 1881, during his time there, he married Eleanor Catherine Mary Munro, the daughter of a previous consul-general. In 1884 he became minister to Argentina and Paraguay, but returned to Europe within a year as envoy to Denmark (1884–1888) and then to Greece (1888–1892).

Shortly after Monson moved to Athens, the United States and Danish governments asked him to resolve a dispute known as the Butterfield Claims that had been running since 1854 and 1855, when two ships belonging to Carlos Butterfield & Co., thought to be carrying war materials to Venezuela, were detained at St Thomas, then a Danish colony. The two governments agreed, "whereas each of the parties hereto has entire confidence in the learning ability and impartiality of Sir Edmund Monson Her British Majesty's Envoy extraordinary and Minister plenipotentiary in Athens", to submit the dispute to his binding arbitration. Monson decided against the United States, but "so satisfied was this [U.S.] government with the judgement of Sir Edmund that it joined Denmark in presenting to him a service of silver plate".

Monson was appointed minister to Belgium in February 1892, but before he had left Athens a political crisis blew up in which King George I used his constitutional authority to dismiss the prime minister, Theodoros Deligiannis, resulting in an election in which Deligiannis lost power. The Times correspondent in Athens commented "It is to be hoped that Sir Edmund Monson, though already appointed to Brussels, may be allowed to remain here for some little time longer. On all sides regrets are expressed that an English diplomatic representative who is so thoroughly acquainted with Greek affairs, and who has gained the sympathy and confidence of all parties, should leave the country at this critical time." However, Monson arrived in Brussels on 25 June.

In 1893 Monson was promoted to ambassador, first to Austria and then in 1896 to France.

Monson took over the Paris embassy at a very difficult period in Anglo-French relations. France's colonial expansion had brought it into conflict with Britain in several parts of the world, and the rivalry between the two countries had been embittered by the Egyptian question, as no French government could reconcile itself to the fact that Britain would not leave the Nile. Complaining that French interests in Egypt were being unfairly treated, the French demanded the end of British occupation there. Conflict arose also in Asia (over Siam) and in Africa (over the upper Nile and the middle Niger).
— Oxford Dictionary of National Biography

In 1897, Monson reported about the Dreyfus Affair that "there is a great probability that complete justice has not been done", the investigation and trial of Captain Alfred Dreyfus on charges of espionage for Germany had been marred by "discreditable proceedings" and there had been a "diabolical conspiracy" in the French Army to frame Dreyfus. About le bordere (the papers stolen from the German embassy that showed there was a spy in the French general staff) that had been used to convict Dreyfus, Monson wrote it "suffices to prove that if this was the sole incriminating letter the convict is an innocent man. To no reflecting or impartial person can there be...a doubt of this.". Monson felt that there might be other reasons for Dreyfus's conviction, but "there has been so much underhand villainy in the way of forgeries connected with the trial, the existence of which is not known to the fanatical and anti-Semitic public, that the government will doubtless be able if they are sufficiently unscrupulous, to produce confirmatory evidence". Monson wrote that he struck by "the strength of the anti-Semitic passion which has been aroused" by the Dreyfus affair. Monson believed that Dreyfus was probably innocent after talking to several diplomats from the German embassy, leading him to conclude that President Jean Casimir-Perier and the foreign minister, Gabriel Hanotaux "must have known' that there was no serious evidence of German diplomatic contact with Dreyfus". Monson reported that Colonel Douglas Dawson, the British military attaché to France, had talking with his friend, Count von Schneider, the Austrian military attaché to France. Monson stated that Dawson had learned about a dinner at the Austrian embassy hosted by the Austrian ambassador, Count Anton Graf von Wolkenstein-Trostburg, attended by Count Georg Herbert Münster, the German ambassador in Paris. Monson reported that Count Münster had declared at the dinner that he never heard of Dreyfus before his arrest. Monson added when Münster was asked about the French officer who was the real spy for Germany, Ferdinand Walsin Esterhazy, that "he replied with a significant smile 'Ah the other gentleman, we know him well.'" Furthermore, Monson reported that Dawson had learned Schneider had received several letters from Esterhazy offering to sell French military secrets to the Austrian empire, and that Esterhazy's handwriting matched perfectly with the handwriting in le bordere, where the author of le bordere likewise offered to sell French military secrets to Germany.

Monson reported to London that though he was convinced that Dreyfus was innocent and the real spy was Esterhazy, that he never mentioned the Dreyfus affair to the French ministers because it would anger them. Monson in a summary stated that Dreyfus was framed; that Esterhazy was the traitor selling the secrets; "wholesale forgeries" had been engaged in to frame Dreyfus; and that General de Boisdeffre, the chief of the French general staff, was a corrupt officer. About the famous libel trial of the writer Émile Zola for his letter J'Accuse...!, Monson wrote that Zola had been convicted because of threats from the mob outside the courtroom threatening to lynch the judges if Zola was acquitted. Monson added "there are many people who declare that his acquittal would produce a revolution or at least a Jewish massacre". On 20 February 1898, Monson wrote that "France in general is off its head" because of the Dreyfus affair and was "a standing danger and menace to Europe".

In July 1898 a French expeditionary force under the command Jean-Baptiste Marchand arrived at Fashoda, in the White Nile state in what is now South Sudan. Marchand had marched his force all the way across the Sahara desert from Sengal to reach Fashoda. Two months later a powerful British force under the command of Herbert Kitchener arrived to confront them. Both sides were polite but insisted on their right to Fashoda. On 14 October 1898, Monson reported to London that the French Army was considering a coup d'état against the government in response to its handling of both the Dreyfus Affair and the Fashoda crisis. The government of Lord Salisbury ordered the Royal Navy to mobilise and had the fleet placed on the highest state of alert. The crisis might have led to war between Britain and France but was resolved by diplomacy, and the French government ordered its troops to withdraw on 3 November. On 6 December Sir Edmund Monson delivered a speech to the British Chamber of Commerce in Paris including this passage:

I would earnestly ask those who directly or indirectly, either as officials in power, or as unofficial exponents of public opinion, are responsible for the direction of the national policy, to discountenance and to abstain from the continuance of that policy of pin-pricks which, while it can only procure ephemeral gratification to a short-lived ministry, must inevitably perpetuate across the Channel an irritation which a high-spirited nation must eventually feel to be intolerable. I would entreat them to resist the temptation to try to thwart British enterprise by petty manoeuvres ... Such ill-considered provocation, to which I confidently trust no official countenance will be given, might well have the effect of converting that policy of forbearance from taking the full advantage of our recent victories and our present position, which has been enunciated by our highest authority, into the adoption of measures which, though they evidently find favour with no inconsiderable party in England, are not, I presume, the object at which French sentiment is aiming."

The vice-president of the Chamber of Commerce wrote "This passage was obviously inserted under instructions from London. It was a discordant note in the harmony of the speech, and in the French rendering it was toned down with a compliment to M. Delcassé [the foreign minister], whose conciliatory attitude the Ambassador commended with gratitude. It was the only passage which could be called intempestif, the term applied to it in France." However, although Monson's remarks caused a storm in the French press, it blew over and "was the last incident to disturb relations which were destined to assume, before his retirement from the Paris Embassy, a character of exceptional cordiality and confidence. ... Sir Edmund Monson contributed his own not inconsiderable share to the rapprochement between Great Britain and France which finally took shape in the agreements of April 4, 1904, and when he resigned, at the beginning of the following year, the entente cordiale ... was already firmly established."

== Honours ==
Edmund Monson was appointed CB in 1878, knighted KCMG in 1886 and promoted to GCMG in 1892. He received the additional honours of GCB in the Queen's Birthday Honours of 1896 and GCVO in 1903 when King Edward VII visited Paris. He was sworn to the Privy Council in 1893 and made a baronet in 1905. The French government awarded him the Grand Cross of the Legion of Honour.

== Family ==
Monson's three sons succeeded to the baronetcy in turn:

- Sir Maxwell William Edmund John Monson, 2nd Baronet (1882 – 1936)
- Sir Edmund St. John Debonnaire John Monson, 3rd Baronet (9 Sep 1883 – 16 Apr 1969)
- Sir George Louis Esme John Monson, 4th Baronet (1888–1969)

None of them had children. and the title became extinct on the death of Sir George. His second son, Sir Edmund, was also a diplomat.

== Offices held ==
Diplomatic posts
Preceded by Clare Ford	Minister Resident and Consul-General to the Oriental Republic of the Uruguay; 1879–1884	Succeeded by Gifford Palgrave
Preceded by George Glynn Petre	Envoy Extraordinary and Minister Plenipotentiary to the Argentine Republic, and Minister Plenipotentiary to the Republic of Paraguay (dual accreditation); 1884	Succeeded by Henry de Norville
Preceded by Hon. Hussey Vivian	Envoy Extraordinary and Minister Plenipotentiary to the King of Denmark; 1884–1888	Succeeded by Hugh MacDonell
Preceded by Sir Horace Rumbold	Envoy Extraordinary and Minister Plenipotentiary to the King of the Hellenes; 1888–1892	Succeeded by Edwin Henry Egerton
Preceded by Hussey Vivian, 3rd Baron Vivian	Envoy Extraordinary and Minister Plenipotentiary to His Majesty the King of the Belgians; 1892–1893	Succeeded by Sir Francis Plunkett
Preceded by Sir Augustus Paget	Ambassador Extraordinary and Plenipotentiary to His Majesty The Emperor of Austria, King of Hungary; 1893–1896	Succeeded by Sir Horace Rumbold
Preceded by The Marquess of Dufferin and Ava	Ambassador Extraordinary and Plenipotentiary to the French Republic; 1896–1905	Succeeded by Sir Francis Bertie
Baronetage of the United Kingdom
New creation	Baronet of Thatched House Lodge; 1905–1909	Succeeded by Maxwell Monson

== Books and articles ==
- Schultz, Kenneth (2001). Democracy and Coercive Diplomacy. Cambridge: Cambridge University Press. ISBN 9780521796699.
- Tombs, Robert (June 1998). "'Lesser Breeds without the Law': The British Establishment and the Dreyfus Affair, 1894-1899". The Historical Journal. 41 (2): 495–510. doi:10.1017/S0018246X98007833.
