= Ewen Broadbent =

British civil servant

Sir Ewen Broadbent, KCB, CMG (9 August 1924 – 27 February 1993) was a British civil servant who occupied a number of senior positions in the British government.

In retirement, he had an appointment as a director of one of Gerald Carroll's Carroll Group companies.

== Appointments ==
- Assistant Under-Secretary of State for Defence 1969-72
- Deputy Under-Secretary of State (Air) 1972-75
- Deputy Under-Secretary of State (Civilian Management) 1975-82
- Second Permanent Under-Secretary of State 1982-84
- Chairman Look Ahead Housing Association 1988-93
- International Military Service Ltd 1991-93

Government offices
Preceded by Sir Arthur Hockaday	Second Permanent Secretary of the Ministry of Defence; 1982–1984	Succeeded by Sir John Blelloch
