= Ian Henderson (diplomat) =

British diplomat (1901–1971)

Sir Ian Henderson KBE CMG

British Ambassador to Panama
- In office 1955–1960
- Preceded by: Eric Cleugh
- Succeeded by: Sir Edgar Vaughan

British Ambassador to Paraguay
- In office 1949–1953
- Preceded by: John Fell
- Succeeded by: Joseph Robinson

Personal details
- Born: 6 July 1901
- Died: 11 May 1971 (aged 69) Torquay
- Education: Trinity College, Oxford
- Occupation: Diplomat

Sir Ian Leslie Henderson (6 July 1901 – 11 May 1971) was a British diplomat who served as ambassador to Paraguay from 1949 to 1953 and ambassador to Panama from 1955 to 1960.

== Early life and education ==
Henderson was born on 6 July 1901, the eldest son of Lieut-Col Hugh Leslie Henderson and Martha Saumarez (née Grosvenor). He was educated at Rugby School, where he was a Derby Scholar and head of the school, and at Trinity College, Oxford, where he took a M.A. in Literae humaniores.

== Career ==
Henderson entered the Consular Service in 1924, and was posted to Genoa in 1926; Zurich in 1928; Lourengo Marques in 1930; Antwerp in 1932; and Innsbruck in 1933. From 1938, he served as an official observer in the Sudeten-German districts of Czechoslovakia with rank of second secretary. In 1939, he served as consul at Rosario, and in the following year was transferred to San Salvador, and appointed chargé d’affaires with the rank of first secretary. From 1942 to 1945, he was employed at the Foreign Office and promoted to first secretary there in 1945.

In 1946, he served as counsellor (commercial) at Prague. In 1949, he was appointed envoy extraordinary and minister plenipotentiary and consul-general at Asuncion, Paraguay and then served as ambassador there from 1952 to 1953. After serving as consul-general at Rotterdam, he was appointed ambassador at Panama in 1954, a post he held until his retirement in 1960.

== Personal life and death ==
Henderson married Phyllis Mary Thornton in 1927. He had no children.

Henderson died on 11 May 1971 at Torquay, aged 69.

== Honours ==
Henderson was appointed Companion of the Order of St Michael and St George (CMG) in the 1952 Birthday Honours, and Knight Commander of the Order of the British Empire (KBE) in the 1958 New Year Honours.

== See also ==
- Panama–United Kingdom relations
- Paraguay–United Kingdom relations

Diplomatic posts
Preceded by John Fell	British Ambassador to Paraguay; 1949–1953	Succeeded by Joseph Robinson
Preceded by Eric Cleugh	British Ambassador to Panama; 1955–1960	Succeeded by Sir Edgar Vaughan
