= Francis Elliot =

British diplomat (1851–1940)

Sir Francis Elliot GCMG GCVO
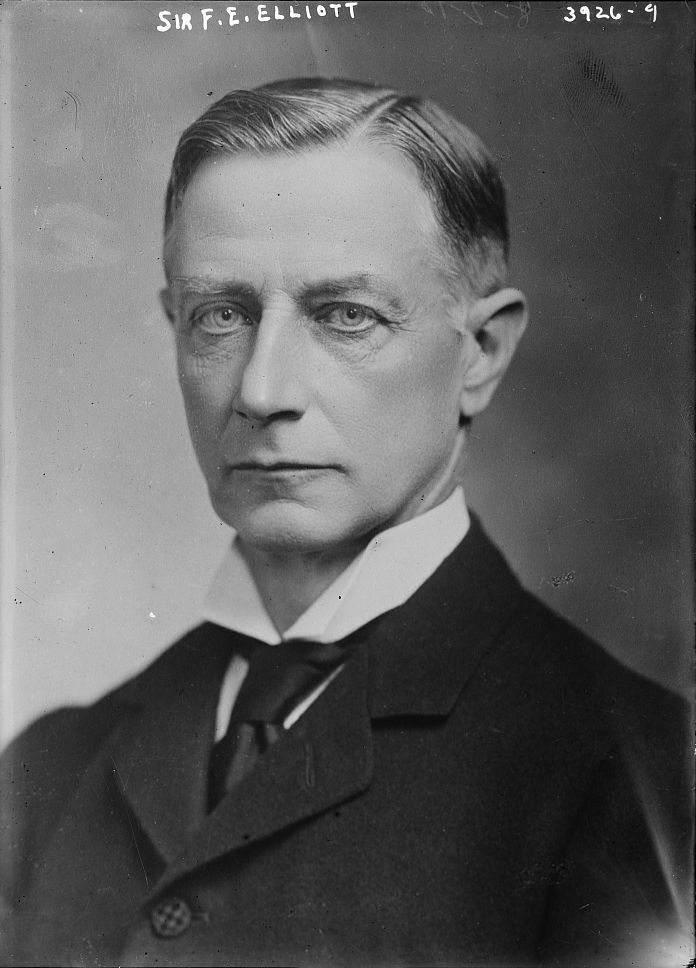

British Ambassador to Greece
- In office 1903–1917
- Preceded by: Edwin Henry Egerton
- Succeeded by: Granville Leveson-Gower, 3rd Earl Granville

Personal details
- Born: 24 March 1851
- Died: 20 January 1940 (aged 88)
- Occupation: Diplomat

Sir Francis Edmund Hugh Elliot GCMG GCVO (24 March 1851 – 20 January 1940) was a British diplomat who was envoy to Greece for 14 years.

== Early life ==
Francis Elliot was the only son of Sir Henry Elliot, also a diplomat, and grandson of the 2nd Earl of Minto. He was at school at Eton College and coxed the school eight at Henley in 1866, 1867 and 1868, when Eton won the Ladies' Plate each year. In his last year, 1869, he rowed bow and Eton again won the Ladies' Plate. Elliot went on to Balliol College, Oxford where he read Classics and rowed in the Balliol eight which went Head of the River. He also rowed in an Oxford-Etonian eight which won the Grand Challenge Cup at Henley in 1871.

== Career ==
Elliot joined the Diplomatic Service and was appointed Attaché at Constantinople in 1874. He served as 3rd Secretary at Vienna and 2nd Secretary at Rio de Janeiro, Stockholm, Lisbon, Cairo and Paris before being appointed Secretary of Legation at Athens in 1890. He moved to Sofia as Agent and Consul-General in 1895. In 1903 he returned to Athens as Envoy Extraordinary and Minister Plenipotentiary,

On the outbreak of World War I Elliot tried to persuade King Constantine to join the Allies, but he insisted on neutrality although the Prime Minister, Eleftherios Venizelos, was in favour of joining the Allies. Events in the Balkans forced the Allies to land troops at Salonika (Thessaloniki) with Venizelos' permission, and in August 1916, followers of Venizelos set up a provisional state in northern Greece with Allied support with the aim of reclaiming the lost regions in Macedonia, effectively splitting Greece into two entities. After intense diplomatic negotiations and an armed confrontation in Athens between Allied and royalist forces (an incident known as Noemvriana) the king abdicated and left Greece in June 1917, and Elliot left at the same time "on leave", but he was replaced shortly afterwards by Lord Granville who had already been accredited to Venizelos' provisional government at Salonika.

Elliot then served as Deputy Controller of the Foreign Trade Department at the Foreign Office until he retired in 1919.

== Family ==
In 1881 Francis Elliot married Henrietta, daughter of Clare Ford who had been his chief in Rio de Janeiro. They had four daughters, the second of whom, Frances Clara, married Alban Young who had been Francis Elliot's junior in Athens.

== Honours ==
Francis Elliot was appointed CMG in January 1904, knighted KCMG in June of the same year and promoted to GCMG in the King's Birthday Honours of 1917. He was given the additional knighthood of GCVO on the occasion of a state visit to England by George I of Greece in 1905.

Diplomatic posts
Preceded by Sir Edwin Egerton	Envoy Extraordinary and Minister Plenipotentiary to His Majesty the King of the Hellenes; 1903–1917	Succeeded by Granville Leveson-Gower, 3rd Earl Granville
