= Charles J. Helm =

American politician and diplomat (1817–1868)

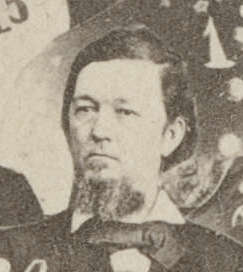
- Portrait of Helm

Member of the Kentucky House of Representatives from the Campbell County district
- In office 1852–1853

Personal details
- Born: Charles John Helm; June 21, 1817 Hornellsville, New York, U.S.
- Died: February 26, 1868 (aged 50) Toronto, Canada
- Resting place: Newport Cemetery; Newport, Kentucky, U.S.
- Spouse: Louise A. Whistler (m. 1854)
- Children: 5
- Occupation: Politician; diplomat; lawyer

Charles John Helm (June 21, 1817 – February 26, 1868) was an American politician, diplomat, and lawyer from Kentucky. He served as a major in the Mexican-American War. He was a member of the Kentucky House of Representatives. He was U.S. commercial agent to St. Thomas and became involved in the Butterfield Claims dispute with Denmark. He then served as U.S. consul general of Cuba. During the Civil War, he was a special agent of the Confederate States government to the West Indies. Following the war, he lived in exile in Toronto for the remainder of his life.

== Early life ==
Charles John Helm was born on June 21, 1817, in Hornellsville, New York, to Sallie (née McKinney) and Francis T. Helm. The family moved to Newport, Kentucky, in 1817. He attended local schools and read law with John W. Tibbatts. He was admitted to the bar in 1842.

== Career ==
Helm practiced law with Tibbatts. He served in the 16th Infantry Regiment during the Mexican-American War. During the war, he served as a first lieutenant under Colonel Tibbatts and as adjutant general and aide to General John E. Wool. He attained the rank of major. Following the war, he continued to practice law in Newport.

In 1851, Helm was elected to the Kentucky House of Representatives, representing Campbell County. He served one term. Helm was appointed as commercial agent to St. Thomas by President Franklin Pierce. He served in that position for four years. In the role, he helped remove duties between the U.S. and St. Thomas. He served in that role during the Butterfield Claims against Denmark. In 1854, two ships from New York were detained in St. Thomas, partially due to a need for repairs and because of suspicions of aid to a rebellion in Venezuela. This led to claims for damages by the Danish government. In an 1890 arbitration, Helm's actions were posthumously reprimanded by the U.S. State Department for his cooperation with the Danish government. In 1858, Helm was appointed as U.S. consul general to Cuba by President James Buchanan. He reportedly had a good relationship with captain-general Francisco Serrano.

Following the election of President Lincoln, Helm resigned as consul general to Cuba. Reportedly William H. Seward tried to gift Helm an American flag to keep Helm loyal to the Union cause. In July 1861, he was appointed as special agent of the Confederate States in the West Indies. He had to travel to Canada and London to make his way to live in his new headquarters in Havana in October 1861. His relationship with Serrano and Serrano's successor helped raise sympathy for the Confederate cause in Cuba. His work in Cuba included the purchase and shipment of arms, supervising blockade running between St. Thomas and Savannah, Georgia, and arranging the transmission of dispatches and movement of passengers between the Confederate States and Europe.

== Personal life ==
Helm married Louise A. Whistler, daughter of William Whistler, on June 16, 1854. They had five children, including Charles Jr. His son Charles was a circuit court judge in Kentucky.

In 1865, Helm was exiled to Canada and lived in Toronto.

Helm died of erysipelas on the morning of February 26, 1868, at the Rossin House Hotel in Toronto. His body was held temporary held in a vault at St. James Cemetery. He was later buried in Newport Cemetery in Newport, Kentucky.
