= Francis Pakenham =

Francis Pakenham may refer to:

- Sir Francis Pakenham (diplomat) (1832–1905), British envoy to Chile, Argentina and Sweden
- Francis Aungier Pakenham, 7th Earl of Longford (1905–2001), British politician and social reformer
