= Margaret Bryan (disambiguation) =

Margaret Bryan may refer to:

- Margaret Bryan (c. 1468–c. 1551/52), Lady Governess to Henry VIII's children
- Margaret Bryan (philosopher) (c. 1759–1836), British natural philosopher and educator
- Margaret Bryan (diplomat) (born 1929), British ambassador
- Peggy Bryan (Margaret Eileen Bryan, 1916–1996), English actress
