= Edwin Corbett =

British diplomat

Edwin Corbett (4 December 1819 – 22 February 1888) was a British diplomat who was envoy to several countries.

== Career ==
Edwin Corbett graduated from Trinity College, Cambridge in 1843, joined the Diplomatic Service in 1847 and was attaché at Paris, Washington, D.C., Madrid and Copenhagen. He was Secretary of Legation at Florence in 1858, at Stockholm in 1860, at Frankfurt in 1862, and at Munich in 1865. In 1866 he was promoted to be chargé d'affaires and Consul-General to the Central American Republics (Guatemala, Nicaragua, Costa Rica, Honduras and Salvador), based in Guatemala City, and in 1873 he was promoted to Minister Resident and Consul-General for the same countries. He was Minister Resident to Switzerland 1874–78 and Envoy Extraordinary and Minister Plenipotentiary to Greece 1878–81, to Brazil 1881–84 and to Sweden and Norway 1884–1888.

== Family ==
Edwin Corbett married Emily Isabella Dutton, daughter of James Dutton, 3rd Baron Sherborne. They had five children.

Diplomatic posts
Preceded by George Buckley Mathew	Chargé d'affaires, then Minister Resident, and Consul-General to the Republics of Guatemala, Nicaragua, Costa Rica, Honduras, and Salvador; 1866–1874	Succeeded by Sidney Locock
Preceded by Alfred Bonar	Minister Resident to the Swiss Confederation; 1874–1878	Succeeded by Sir Horace Rumbold, 8th Baronet
Preceded by Hon. William Stuart	Envoy Extraordinary and Minister Plenipotentiary to the King of the Hellenes; 1878–1881	Succeeded by Clare Ford
Preceded by Clare Ford	Envoy Extraordinary and Minister Plenipotentiary to the Emperor of Brazil; 1881–1884	Succeeded by Hugh MacDonell
Preceded by Sir Horace Rumbold, 8th Baronet	Envoy Extraordinary and Minister Plenipotentiary to the King of Sweden and Norway; 1884–1888	Succeeded by Sir Francis Plunkett
