= George Glynn Petre =

British diplomat (1822–1905)

Sir George Petre KCMG CB (4 September 1822 – 17 May 1905) was a British diplomat who was envoy to Argentina, Paraguay and Portugal.

== Family ==
George Glynn Petre was a great-grandson of Robert Petre, 9th Baron Petre, a Roman Catholic family, and was educated at Stonyhurst College and the then Roman Catholic College at Prior Park, Bath. George's mother was Elizabeth Glynn, daughter of Edmund John Glynn of the village of Glynn, Cornwall.

== Career ==
Petre joined the Diplomatic Service in 1846 as an attaché at the British Legation in Frankfurt, then the capital of the German Confederation, and he was there during the revolutions of 1848. He moved to Hanover in 1852, Paris in 1853, The Hague in 1855 and Naples in 1856, where he was chargé d'affaires from July 1856 when the ambassador, Sir William Temple, left due to illness, until October of that year when diplomatic relations with the Kingdom of the Two Sicilies were broken off. Petre was transferred, as Secretary of Legation, back to Hanover where he was chargé d'affaires between envoys. He moved on to Copenhagen where in 1865 he assisted at the investiture of King Christian IX with the Order of the Garter. Petre was posted on to Brussels in 1866, then promoted to Secretary of Embassy at Berlin 1868–72, including the period of the Franco-Prussian War. He was then appointed "Permanent Chargé d'Affaires" at Stuttgart (capital of the Kingdom of Württemberg) 1872–81. He was Envoy Extraordinary and Minister Plenipotentiary to the Argentine Republic 1881–84, and was also appointed non-resident Minister Plenipotentiary to Paraguay from 1882. In 1884 he was posted as envoy to Portugal, where he remained until he retired on 1 January 1893.

During Petre's time at Lisbon there were tensions between the United Kingdom and Portugal over Portuguese expansion in southern Africa. In 1887 and 1889 the Foreign Secretary, Lord Salisbury, instructed Petre to protest at Portuguese attempts to extend their territories into Mashonaland and northwards to Lake Nyasa. Salisbury and the Portuguese minister in London signed a convention to resolve these disputes on 20 August 1890, but the Portuguese government fell before ratifying it and negotiations had to start again. "A modus vivendi was agreed upon and signed by Lord Salisbury and the new Portuguese minister, Senhor Luiz de Soveral, on 14 November 1890, by which Portugal granted free transit over the waterways of the Zambesi, Shire and Pungwe rivers and a satisfactory settlement was finally placed on record in the convention signed by Petre and the Portuguese minister for foreign affairs on 11 June 1891. Petre's naturally calm and conciliatory disposition and the excellent personal relations which he succeeded in maintaining with the Portuguese ministers did much to keep the discussions on a friendly basis and to procure acceptance of the British demands."

== Honours ==
Petre was appointed CB in 1886 and knighted KCMG in 1890.

Diplomatic posts
Preceded by Robert Morier	Chargé d'affaires at Stuttgart; 1872–1881	Succeeded by Gerard Gould
Preceded by Sir Horace Rumbold, 8th Baronet	Envoy Extraordinary and Minister Plenipotentiary to the Argentine Republic, and Minister Plenipotentiary to the Republic of Paraguay; 1881–1884	Succeeded by Hon. Edmund Monson
Preceded by Charles Lennox Wyke	Envoy Extraordinary and Minister Plenipotentiary to the King of Portugal; 1884–1893	Succeeded by Sir Hugh MacDonell
