= List of ambassadors of the United Kingdom to Panama =

The ambassador of the United Kingdom to Panama is the United Kingdom's foremost diplomatic representative in the Republic of Panama.

== List of heads of mission ==
=== Envoys extraordinary and ministers plenipotentiary ===
- 1914–1919: Sir Claude Mallet Consul from 1904, Minister Resident from 1907, Envoy Extraordinary and Minister Plenipotentiary from 1914
- 1920–1923: Andrew Bennett
- 1923–1931: Charles Wallis
- 1931–1934: Sir Josiah Crosby
- 1934–1939: Frederick Adam
- 1939–1943: Charles Dodd
- 1943–1946: Stanley Irving
- 1946–1950: John Greenway
- 1950–1953: Eric Cleugh

=== Ambassadors extraordinary and plenipotentiary ===
- 1953–1955: Eric Cleugh
- 1955–1960: Sir Ian Henderson
- 1960–1963: Sir Edgar Vaughan
- 1964–1966: Sir Alan Williams
- 1966–1969: The Hon. Henry Hankey
- 1969–1970: Ronald Scrivener
- 1971–1974: Dugald Malcolm
- 1974–1978: Robert John
- 1978–1980: John Sanders
- 1981–1983: Stanley Stephenson
- 1983–1986: Terence Steggle
- 1986–1989: Margaret Bryan
- 1989–1992: John MacDonald
- 1992–1996: Thomas Malcomson
- 1996–1999: William Sinton
- 1999–2002: Glyn Davies
- 2002–2006: James Malcolm
- 2006–2011: Richard Austen
- 2012–2013: Michael Holloway
- 2013–2017: Ian Collard
- 2017–2021: Damion Potter
- 2021–2024: Tim Stew
- 2024–2025: James Dauris
- 2025–present: Greg Houston
