= Edwin Henry Egerton =

British diplomat

The Right Honourable Sir Edwin Egerton GCMG KCB
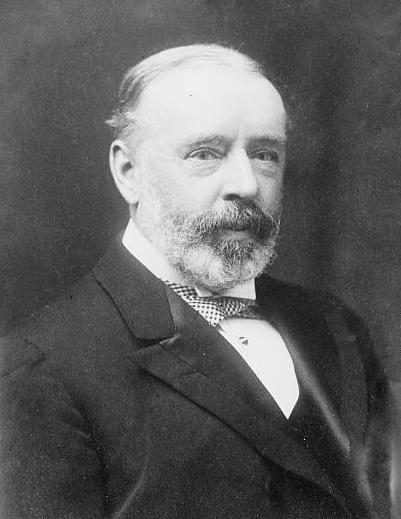

British Ambassador to Italy
- In office 1905–1908
- Preceded by: Sir Francis Bertie
- Succeeded by: Sir Rennell Rodd

British Ambassador to Spain
- In office 1903–1904
- Preceded by: Sir Mortimer Durand
- Succeeded by: Sir Arthur Nicolson

British Ambassador to Greece
- In office 1892–1903
- Preceded by: Hon. Edmund Monson
- Succeeded by: Sir Francis Elliot

Personal details
- Born: 8 November 1841
- Died: 8 July 1916 (aged 74)
- Occupation: Diplomat

Sir Edwin Henry Egerton, GCMG, KCB, PC (8 November 1841 – 8 July 1916) was a British diplomat who was envoy to Greece and ambassador to Spain and Italy.

== Career ==
Edwin Egerton was educated at Eton College, and joined the Diplomatic Service in 1859 as an attaché at St Petersburg. He was Secretary of Legation at Buenos Aires 1879–1881 and at Athens 1881–85; Consul-General in Egypt 1884–85; Secretary of Embassy at Constantinople in 1885 and at Paris during 1885–86; Envoy Extraordinary and Minister Plenipotentiary to Greece 1892–1903; Ambassador to Spain 1903–04 and Ambassador to Italy 1905–08.

During his time in Paris, Egerton was trained by Richard Lyons, 1st Viscount Lyons, who was then British Ambassador to France. Egerton was a member of the Tory-sympathetic 'Lyons School' of British diplomacy.

When Egerton retired in 1908, The Times correspondent in Rome wrote:

He will be followed into his retirement by the good wishes not only of the British colony, who received constant proofs of his kindness and interest in their concern, but also of the Italian Government, which has always found in him a cordial representative of the traditional friendship that has so long existed between England and Italy. During his tenure of his post no questions of any great moment have arisen between the two countries but, should such questions arise in the future, Sir Edwin has simplified their solution for his successors by enhancing the kindly feeling of Anglo-Italian relations. The British Archaeological School in Rome owes much to his generosity and has received from him the same liberal and personal support which he formerly gave to the school in Athens, while the untiring efforts of Lady Egerton in the cause of charity should have earned the lasting gratitude of many poor British subjects. The general regret experienced at their departure will be doubly felt by the many friends in whom they have inspired a sentiment of warm affection.

== Honours ==
Egerton was appointed Companion of the Order of the Bath (CB) in 1886, and knighted as a Knight Commander (KCB) of the same order in 1897. He received the Knight Grand Cross of the Order of St Michael and St George (GCMG) in the 1902 Coronation Honours list published on 26 June 1902, and was invested as such by King Edward VII at Buckingham Palace on 8 August 1902.

== Family ==
Edwin Egerton was a son of the Rev. Thomas Egerton (1809–1847) and Charlotte Catherine (1812–1894), daughter of Sir William Milner, 4th Baronet. He was a grandson of Wilbraham Egerton (MP died 1856) and a nephew of William Egerton, 1st Baron Egerton.

He married in 1895 Olga, daughter of Prince Nicholas Lobanov-Rostovsky of Lobanovo, Russia, and widow of M. Michel Katkoff who had been Russian Secretary of Legation at Lisbon. They had one son, John Frederick, who was killed in the First World War.

Diplomatic posts
| Preceded by Hon. Edmund Monson | Envoy Extraordinary and Minister Plenipotentiary to His Majesty the King of the Hellenes; 1892–1903 | Succeeded by Sir Francis Elliot |
| Preceded by Sir Mortimer Durand | Ambassador Extraordinary and Plenipotentiary to His Majesty the King of Spain; 1903–1904 | Succeeded by Sir Arthur Nicolson |
| Preceded by Sir Francis Bertie | Ambassador Extraordinary and Plenipotentiary to His Majesty the King of Italy; 1905–1908 | Succeeded by Sir Rennell Rodd |
