= Anthony Garner =

Sir Anthony Garner
- Born: 28 January 1927; Liverpool, England
- Died: 22 March 2015 (aged 88)
- Education: Liverpool College
- Occupation: Political activist
- Parent(s): Edward Garner; Dorothy May

Sir Anthony Stuart Garner (28 January 1927 – 22 March 2015) was a political organiser for the British Conservative Party.

== Early life ==
Anthony Garner was born on 28 February 1927 in Liverpool, England. He was educated at Liverpool College.

== Career ==
Garner first worked for the Conservative Party as an organiser for the Young Conservatives in Yorkshire in 1948. He revived the membership by organising fundraising weekends at Filey Holiday Camp. By 1951, he became a Conservative Party agent in Halifax, West Yorkshire. He worked on the campaigns of Prime Ministers Harold Macmillan in 1959 and Sir Alec Douglas-Home in 1964.

Later, he worked as an agent for London at the Conservative Central Office. He served as the Director of Organisation from 1976 to 1988. In this capacity, he was instrumental in putting the local organisation in place that ensured that Margaret Thatcher won the elections of 1979, 1983 and 1987. He escaped unscathed from the Brighton hotel bombing.

He served as the Director of Campaigning from 1992 to 1998. He was a co-founder of Conservatives Abroad.

He later worked as a lobbyist, co-founder and Chairman of the British-Iranian Chamber of Commerce. He also served on the Boards of Directors of the Carroll Anglo-American group, the Carroll Aircraft Corporation and the Farnborough Aerospace Development Corporation.

He served as a Governor of his alma mater, Liverpool College, and as President of the Old Lerpoolian Association. He received a knighthood in 1984.

== Personal life ==
He married Shirley Taylor in 1967 They had two sons, Christopher and David

== Death ==
He died on 22 March 2015. He was eighty-eight years old.
