= Carroll Group =

British property development company

- Type: Privately held
- Industry: Property development
- Founded: c. 1920s
- Founder: John E. "Jock" Carroll
- Headquarters: London
- Key people: Gerald Carroll; Anthony Clarke (CEO)

The Carroll Group was a family-owned group of businesses formed in the early twentieth century that expanded rapidly in the 1980s when it was taken over by Gerald Carroll, grandson of the founder. At that time it was one of the largest private businesses in Britain, but it collapsed in the early 1990s under the weight of its debt and amid accusations of fraud. Gerald Carroll has since campaigned to have the collapse of the group recognised as a fraud but without apparent success.

== Origins ==
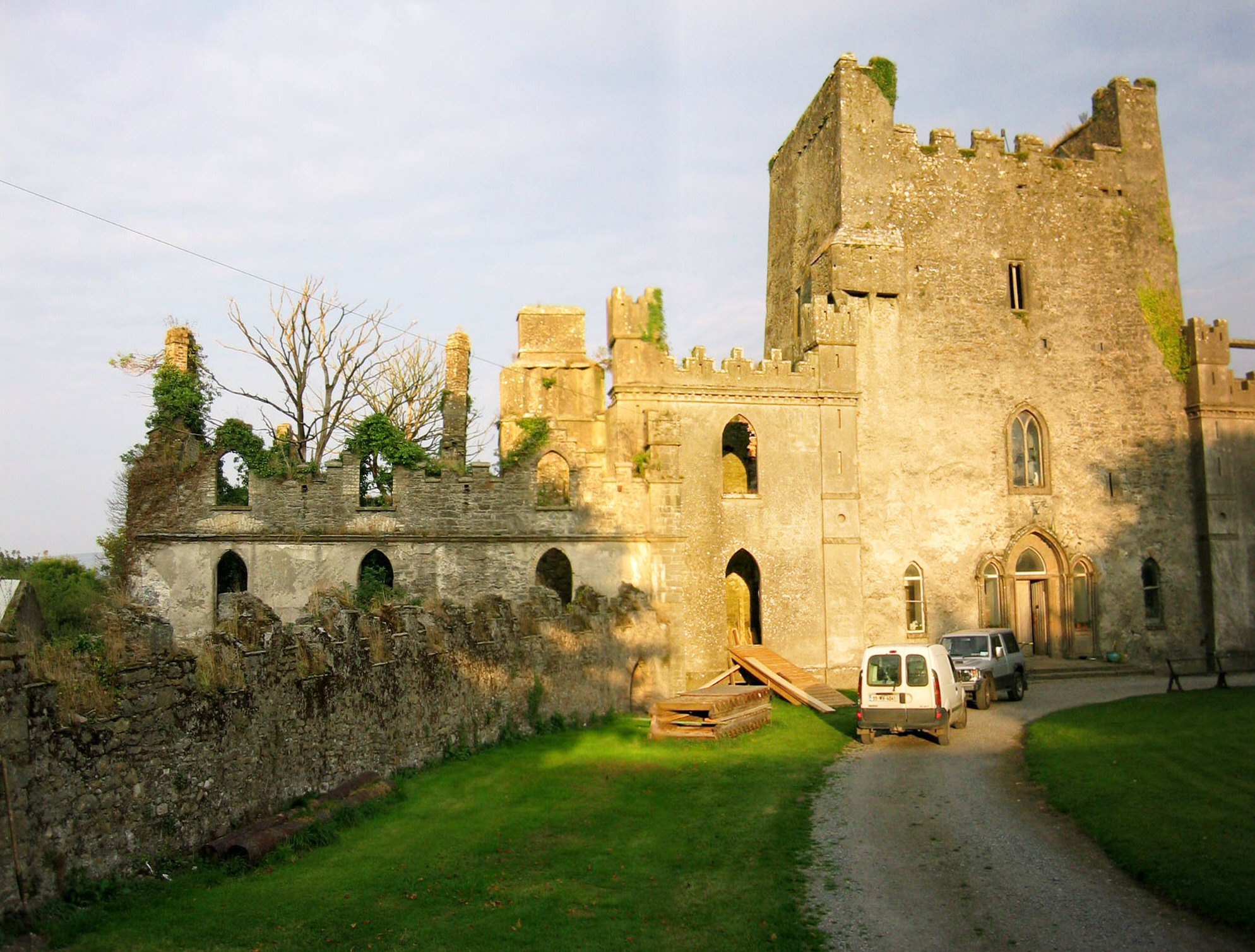
Leap Castle, Birr, Ireland. Once in the ownership of the O'Carroll clan.

The Carroll Group was a three generation family-owned private business founded by John E. "Jock" Carroll who was descended from the Irish O'Carroll clan. Jock may have had a role in the purchase by the Ford Motor Company in 1924 of the land in Essex on which the company built its Dagenham car plant. The plant produced its first vehicle in 1931. The business was then taken over by Jock's son John Carroll (born around 1929) and in the late 1970s by his grandson Gerald Carroll (born 1951) after which it began to expand rapidly.

== 1980s ==
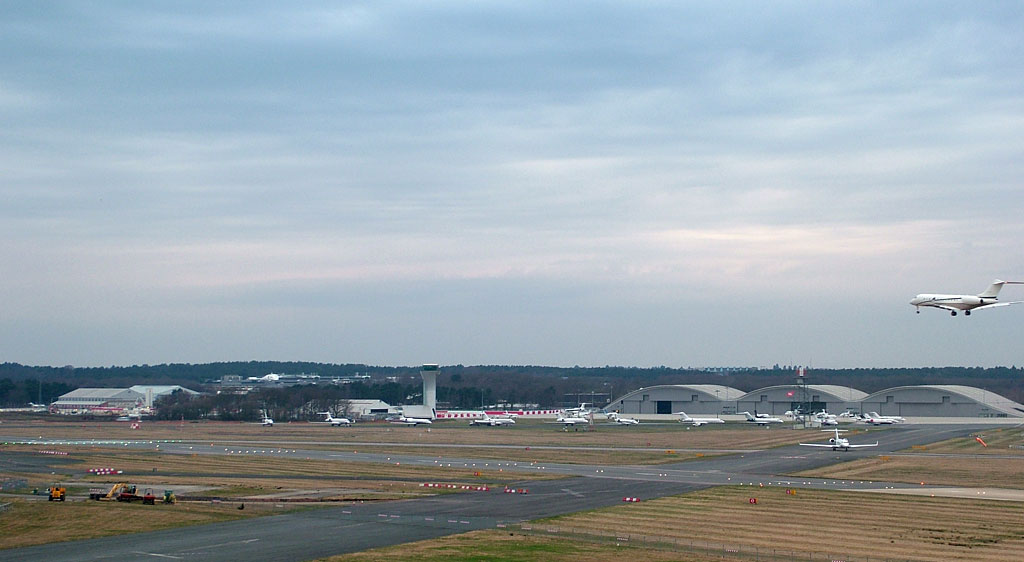
Farnborough Airport, Hampshire

In addition to pre-existing Carroll businesses, Gerald Carroll was active as a businessman in his own right. He claimed in a 2001 Sky News interview to be a self-made man. He launched a bid for quoted car dealership Frank G. Gates in 1985 but specialised in spotting property development sites and obtaining planning permission for them. In 1986, 85 group companies and the Carroll family art collection were placed in a trust, The Carroll Foundation, which was estimated to have net assets worth £250m, and which from then on became the principal vehicle through which the Carroll Group operated.

The group described itself as "An integrated holdings group with global capacity" operating in Australasia, Europe, North America and the U.S.S.R. Its businesses included meat processing and sheep farming in Australia, financial services in the Caribbean, and commercial property holdings in Ireland. The group at one time owned 5% of the Manchester Ship Canal. It redeveloped the Farnborough airfield for the Ministry of Defence and the Carroll Aircraft Corporation held the licence for civil operations there.

Directors of group companies included British establishment figures such as Air Marshal Sir Barry Duxbury, Air Marshal Sir Ivor Broom, Sir Ewen Broadbent, Group Captain Peter Townsend, Sir Curtis Keeble (a former UK ambassador to the Soviet Union), and former environment minister Sir Eldon Griffiths. Conservative Party organiser Sir Anthony Garner was a director of the Carroll Anglo-American group, the Carroll Aircraft Corporation and the Farnborough Aerospace Development Corporation.

The Carroll Foundation agreed a three-year sponsorship deal for the July Cup at Newmarket Racecourse, and Gerald Carroll became known for his lavish entertaining there and at other events. In 1988, he bought Warren Park stud farm at Newmarket from Captain Marcos Lemos for £7 million together with its 300 acres of land and a large house. He had a collection of prestige cars that included Bentleys and Lamborghinis. Carroll bought the yearling racehorse Carroll House for 32,000 guineas and then sold him to Antonio Balzarini. The horse went on to win the Prix de l'Arc de Triomphe in 1989.

In 1989, the group signed a protocol of intent for a £150 million British-Soviet trade centre to be built in Moscow in conjunction with Balfour Beatty. Had it gone ahead, the project would have included a hotel, housing and offices. Finance was reported to have been arranged with Samuel Montagu and the Moscow Narodny Bank. In 1989, the group had projects under way, excluding the Russian project, that if realised would have been valued at around £2 billion. Among the U.K. projects were a £500 million mixed development at Valley Park in Croydon, another at Hatfield, Watford Business Park, and Metroplex Business Park at Salford, Greater Manchester.

== 1990s ==
The Galleria, Hatfield.

Around mid 1990, there began to be speculation in the City of London that the Carroll Group had over-extended itself. The Observer, who described the group as "one of Britain's largest private enterprises", reported however that the chief executive of Carroll Industries Corporation, Anthony Clarke, flatly denied that anything was wrong, stating that pre-tax profits for the year ended 30 March 1990 were £13 million compared to £14.1 million for the eleven months ended 30 March 1989. The paper noted, however, an increase in debt from £1.5 million in August 1988, to £141 million in July 1989 and £148 million in March 1990.

The technically ambitious project to build the Galleria shopping centre above the A1(M) motorway at Hatfield, Hertfordshire, was budgeted at £50 million but cost £90 million by the time it was finished 18 months late. Carroll refinanced the project and injected £30 million. It opened in 1991 but bankers Samuel Montagu placed the scheme in receivership in 1992. Afterwards, records were found showing the purchase of bugging equipment and the employment of private detectives to watch the bankers involved.

In July 1992, a rescue operation was carried out in conjunction with Midland Bank and £100m of assets were moved from the Carroll Foundation to the Urban Finance Corporation Limited which was incorporated on 10 April 1992 and last filed accounts for the year ended 31 March 1993.

Despite looming trouble from rising debts, Gerald Carroll continued to try to make deals. In September 1992, he visited Russia with executives from the British Sugar Corporation, ex-Foreign Office diplomats and a former British ambassador to Moscow, to meet the Russian vice-president Alexander Rutskoi. Carroll had come up with a deal to sell Siberian oil in order for the BSC to expand sugar beet production in the Kursk region who would then send the sugar to Siberia where there was supposedly a shortage. The deal quickly fell apart when it transpired that the Siberians had sold the same oil to three different buyers.

== Collapse ==
In January 1995, Midland Bank, bankers to the Urban Finance Corporation and owed £26 million, appointed Ernst & Young as administrative receivers to the company and in February 1995, Gerald Carroll filed for personal bankruptcy at Reading with debts of up to £40 million. Other creditors of Gerald Carroll or the Carroll Group companies included Hypo Bank who were owed £30 million, Canadian Imperial Bank of Commerce £16 million and Samuel Montagu £5 million.

== Allegations of fraud ==
Since the collapse of the group, Gerald Carroll has campaigned to have the break-up of the Carroll Group recognised as a fraud in which the assets of the group were siphoned off until nothing was left. He has supplied information to the Serious Fraud Office relating to the matter, but nobody has been prosecuted. Allegations have centered on the creation of duplicate companies at the time of the 1992 reorganisation. Ely Property, for instance, a Carroll Group company that owned the Tower Shopping Centre in Ballymena, had its name changed to Winskirk in September 1992 while a second company had its name changed from Winskirk to Ely Property. The same process was carried out for the Farnborough Aerospace Development Corporation and its subsidiaries, Carroll Aircraft Corporation and the Strategic Research and Development Corporation.

An active campaign continues on social media such as Twitter, Facebook and blogspot.com that links the alleged fraud to current events and popular conspiracy theories. As of 5 September 2017 the @carrolltrust account on Twitter had 2.04 million followers and had broadcast over 100,000 tweets.

== Philanthropy ==
The Carroll Foundation supported a number of charitable causes. In 1990, it endowed a chair of Irish history for £1.5m at Hertford College, University of Oxford, and between 1988 and 2003 the Foundation funded a prize of £3,000 by the Royal Society of Portrait Painters for the most outstanding portrait fine art work.
