= Arthur Hockaday =

English civil servant

Sir Arthur Patrick Hockaday, KCB, CMG (17 March 1926 – 21 August 2004) was an English civil servant. Educated at St John's College, Oxford, he entered the civil service in 1949 as an Admiralty official. Between 1962 and 1965, he was private secretary to the Secretary of State for Defence. He was then seconded to NATO before returning to the Ministry of Defence in 1969 and then serving in the Cabinet Office from 1972 to 1973, when he was appointed deputy secretary for policy at the Ministry of Defence. He was then Second Permanent Secretary from 1976 to 1982. From 1982 to 1989, he was Director-General of the Commonwealth War Graves Commission.

Government offices
Preceded by Sir William Geraghty (as Second Permanent Secretary (Administration))	Second Permanent Secretary of the Ministry of Defence; 1976–1982	Succeeded by Sir Ewen Broadbent
