= Edgar Vaughan =

British diplomat

Sir (George) Edgar Vaughan KBE FRHistS (24 February 1907 – 25 January 1994) was a British diplomat.

Vaughan was educated at Cheltenham Grammar School and then at Jesus College, Oxford, where he obtained first-class degrees in Modern History (1928) and in PPE (1929). He was a Laming Travelling Fellow of The Queen's College, Oxford, from 1929 to 1931. He joined His Majesty's Diplomatic Service in 1930, serving as Vice-Consul in Hamburg, La Paz, Barcelona and Buenos Aires. After posting in Monrovia (as Chargé d'affaires), Seattle, Washington, Lourenço Marques and Amsterdam (as Consul-General in each), he returned to Buenos Aires as Minister and Consul-General in 1956, before being appointed Ambassador to Panama in 1960.

In 1964 he became Ambassador to Colombia, serving until 1966. He was appointed OBE in 1937, advanced to CBE in 1956 and knighted KBE in 1963. After leaving the Diplomatic Service, he was a Special Lecturer (1966–1967) then Professor of History (1967–1974) at the University of Saskatchewan, Regina Campus. He was appointed as a Fellow of the Royal Historical Society in 1965 and as an Honorary Fellow of Jesus College in 1966. He was awarded the Order of Andrés Bello, First Class, by the government of Venezuela in 1990. He died on 25 January 1994.

Diplomatic posts
Preceded by Ian Henderson	Ambassador Extraordinary and Plenipotentiary at Panama; 1960–1963	Succeeded by Alan Williams
Preceded by Stanley Fordham	Ambassador Extraordinary and Plenipotentiary at Bogotá; 1964–1966	Succeeded by Hilary Young
