= Iain Sutherland (diplomat) =

British diplomat (1925–1986)

Sir Iain Sutherland KCMG

British Ambassador to USSR
- In office 1982–1985
- Prime Minister: Margaret Thatcher
- Preceded by: Sir Curtis Keeble
- Succeeded by: Sir Bryan Cartledge

British Ambassador to Greece
- In office 1978–1982
- Prime Minister: Jim Callaghan; Margaret Thatcher
- Preceded by: Sir Brooks Richards
- Succeeded by: Sir Peregrine Rhodes

Personal details
- Born: 15 June 1925 Edinburgh, Scotland
- Died: 1 July 1986 (aged 61) Westminster Hospital, London
- Resting place: Highgate Cemetery
- Education: University of Aberdeen; Balliol College, Oxford

Sir Iain Johnstone Macbeth Sutherland KCMG (15 June 1925 – 1 July 1986) was a British diplomat and Ambassador to the Soviet Union between 1982 and 1985.

== Early career ==
Iain Sutherland's parents were the Scottish artists David Macbeth Sutherland and Dorothy Johnstone. He was born in Edinburgh in 1925 and was educated at Fettes College, The University of Aberdeen and Balliol College, Oxford. Sutherland served with the Royal Artillery from 1944 to 1947, and entered the Diplomatic Service in 1950. After initially training in Russian, he was posted to Belgrade in 1956, became Head of Chancery in Havana, Cuba, in 1959 and was posted to Washington in 1962 immediately after the Cuban Missile Crisis. He was appointed Consul-general in Jakarta in 1967 and was head of the Foreign Office's South Asia department from 1969 to 1973 before being appointed as Minister in Moscow in 1974. After a sabbatical and fellowship in International Affairs at Harvard University, Sutherland was appointed British Ambassador to Greece in 1978 until 1982. He was appointed Knight Commander of the Order of St Michael and St George (KCMG) in the 1982 New Year Honours.

== Ambassador to Russia ==
Sutherland returned to Moscow in 1982 as ambassador. His tenure was overshadowed by the Soviet occupation of Afghanistan and the expulsion of Soviet spies from the United Kingdom at a time of increased tension often called the Second Cold War. Sutherland retired from his post in 1985.

== Death ==
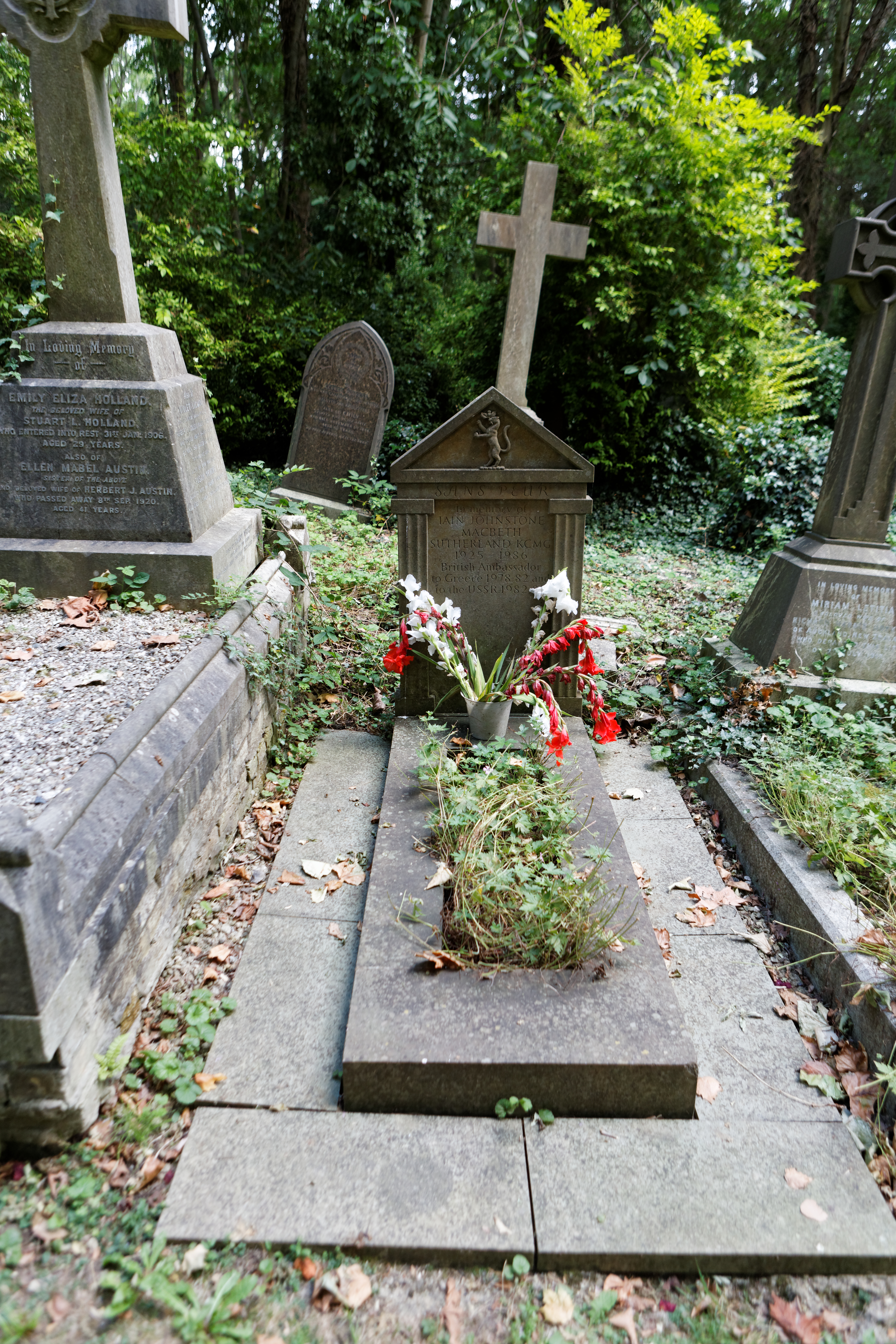
Sutherland's grave in Highgate Cemetery.

Sutherland collapsed from a heart attack whilst waiting for a train at Bond Street tube station, London. He was taken to Westminster Hospital but later died aged 61 and is buried on the east side of Highgate Cemetery.

His wife Jeanne (née Nutt) survived him and wrote an autobiography of her experiences during the Cold War, From Moscow to Cuba and Beyond: A Diplomatic Memoir of the Cold War and also the significant changes during the educational reforms in the last years of the Soviet Union and afterwards in the Russian Federation. She died in 2023, aged 95.
