= Robin Christopher (diplomat) =

British diplomat (born 1944)

Sir Duncan Christopher KBE CMG
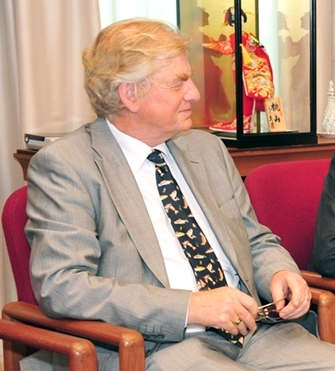
- Sir Duncan Christopher in diplomatic service
- Born: 13 October 1944 (age 81)
- Education: Keble College, Oxford; Fletcher School of Law and Diplomacy, Tufts University
- Occupations: Diplomat (retired), consultant, charity trustee
- Employer(s): Foreign and Commonwealth Office (1970–2004)
- Known for: British Ambassador to Ethiopia, Indonesia, and Argentina
- Title: Ambassador of the United Kingdom to Argentina
- Term: 2000–2004
- Predecessor: Robin Christopher
- Successor: John Hughes
- Awards: Companion of the Order of St Michael and St George (CMG) (1997); Knight Commander of the Order of the British Empire (KBE) (2000)

Sir Duncan Robin Carmichael Christopher KBE CMG (born 13 October 1944) is a British retired diplomat, now a consultant and charity trustee.

== Career ==
Christopher was educated at Keble College, Oxford, and the Fletcher School of Law and Diplomacy at Tufts University. He joined the Foreign and Commonwealth Office (FCO) in 1970 and served at New Delhi, Lusaka and Madrid before being appointed ambassador to the Federal Democratic Republic of Ethiopia 1994–1997, ambassador to the Republic of Indonesia 1997–2000 and ambassador to the Argentine Republic 2000–2004.

Christopher retired from the Diplomatic Service after his posting to Argentina. He was secretary-general 2007–11 and projects director 2011–15 of the Global Leadership Foundation. He has been a trustee of the Brooke Hospital for Animals, Partners for Change Ethiopia (then known as St Matthew's Children's Fund), Prospect Burma and Redress.

== Honours ==
Christopher was appointed CMG in the 1997 Birthday Honours and knighted KBE in the 2000 New Year Honours.

Diplomatic posts
Preceded by James Glaze	British Ambassador to Ethiopia; 1994–1997	Succeeded by Gordon Wetherell
Preceded by Graham Burton	British Ambassador to Indonesia; 1997–2000	Succeeded by Richard Gozney
Preceded by William Marsden	British Ambassador to Argentina; 2000–2004	Succeeded by John Hughes
