= Peregrine Rhodes =

British diplomat

Sir Peregrine Rhodes KCMG

British Ambassador to Greece
- In office 1982–1985
- Preceded by: Sir Iain Sutherland
- Succeeded by: Sir Jeremy Thomas

British Ambassador to Cyprus
- In office 1979–1982
- Preceded by: Donald McDonald Gordon
- Succeeded by: William Wilberforce

Personal details
- Born: 14 May 1925
- Died: 7 March 2005 (aged 79)
- Occupation: Diplomat

Military service
- Allegiance: United Kingdom
- Branch/service: British Army
- Years of service: 1944-1947
- Unit: Coldstream Guards
- Battles/wars: Second World War

Sir Peregrine Alexander Rhodes KCMG (14 May 1925 - 7 March 2005) was a British diplomat.

Rhodes was the son of Cyril Edmunds Rhodes, by his wife Elizabeth, and was educated at Winchester College and at New College, Oxford. He served in the closing stages of the Second World War as an officer in the Coldstream Guards, before joining the Foreign Office in 1950. He served as the Second Secretary in Rangoon (1953–56), Private Secretary to the Minister of State (1956–59), First Secretary in Vienna (1959–62) and the First Secretary in Helsinki (1962–65). He was posted at the Foreign and Commonwealth Office between 1965 and 1968, before holding senior diplomatic posts in Rome and East Berlin. From 1975 to 1978 he was on secondment at the Cabinet Office. Between 1979 and 1982 he served as High Commissioner to Cyprus and was Ambassador to Greece from 1982 to 1985. He subsequently worked as Chairman of the Anglo-Hellenic League (1986–90) and as Vice-President of the British School at Athens from 1982 to 2002.

He was appointed a Companion of the Order of St Michael and St George in 1976, and was made a Knight Commander in the same order in 1984. Rhodes was made a Fellow of the Royal Society of Arts in 1988.

He married firstly, in 1951, Jane Marion Hassell, by whom he had two sons and one daughter. He married secondly Margaret Rosemary Page in 1969. His grave lies in the churchyard of St Mary's, Thorpe Morieux, Suffolk.
