= List of ambassadors of the United Kingdom to Greece =

Ambassador of the United Kingdom to the Hellenic Republic
- Coat of arms of the United Kingdom
- Incumbent; Matthew Lodge since August 2021
- Style: His Excellency
- Residence: Athens
- Appointer: King Charles III
- Inaugural holder: Edward Dawkins; First Minister Plenipotentiary
- Formation: 1833; Minister Plenipotentiary 1862; Envoy Extraordinary 1943; Ambassador Extraordinary
- Website: UK and Greece

The ambassador of the United Kingdom to Greece is the United Kingdom's foremost diplomatic representative in Greece, and head of the UK's diplomatic mission in Greece. The official title is His Britannic Majesty's Ambassador to the Hellenic Republic.

The modern Greek state (then the Kingdom of Greece) was established in 1832 at the London Conference of 1832 and internationally recognised in the same year by the Treaty of Constantinople, in which Greece secured full independence from the Ottoman Empire.

Besides the embassy in Athens, the UK government is represented by vice-consulates on the islands of Corfu, Crete and Rhodes, and by an honorary vice consulate on Zakynthos.

== Heads of mission ==
=== Ministers plenipotentiary to the king of Greece ===
- 1833–1835: Edward Dawkins
- 1835–1849: Sir Edmund Lyons, Bt
- 1849–1862: Sir Thomas Wyse

=== Envoys extraordinary and ministers plenipotentiary to the king of Greece ===
- 1862–1864: Peter Scarlett
- 1864–1872: Hon. Edward Erskine
- 1872–1877: Hon. William Stuart
- 1877–1881: Edwin Corbett
- 1881–1884: Clare Ford
- 1884–1888: Sir Horace Rumbold, Bt
- 1888–1892: Hon. Edmund Monson
- 1892–1903: Edwin Egerton
- 1903–1917: Sir Francis Elliot
- 1917–1921: Granville Leveson-Gower, 3rd Earl Granville
- 1921–1922: Francis Lindley

Break in diplomatic relations – see 1922 in Greece

=== Envoys extraordinary and ministers plenipotentiary to the Hellenic Republic ===
- 1924–1926: Sir Milne Cheetham
- 1926–1929: Sir Percy Loraine, Bt
- 1929–1933: Hon. Patrick Ramsay
- 1933–1939: Sir Sydney Waterlow
- 1939–1943: Michael Palairet

=== Ambassadors extraordinary and plenipotentiary ===
- 1943–1946: Sir Reginald Leeper
- 1946–1951: Sir Clifford Norton
- 1951–1957: Sir Charles Peake
- 1957–1961: Sir Roger Allen
- 1962–1967: Sir Ralph Murray
- 1967–1971: Sir Michael Stewart
- 1971–1974: Sir Robin Hooper
- 1974–1978: Sir Brooks Richards
- 1978–1982: Sir Iain Sutherland
- 1982–1985: Sir Peregrine Rhodes
- 1985–1989: Sir Jeremy Thomas
- 1989–1993: Sir David Miers
- 1993–1996: Oliver Miles
- 1996–1999: Sir Michael Llewellyn-Smith
- 1999–2004: Sir David Madden
- 2004–2008: Sir Simon Gass
- 2008–2013: David Landsman
- 2013–2016: John Kittmer
- 2017–2021: Kate Smith
- 2021–present: Matthew Lodge
