= Sir Horace Rumbold, 8th Baronet =

British diplomat (1829–1913)

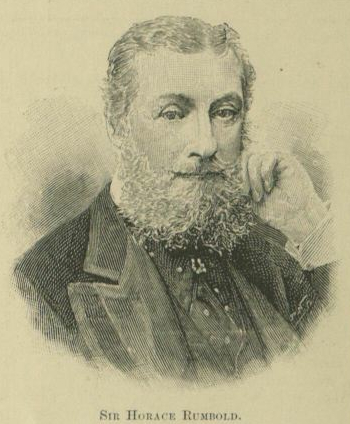
Sir Horace Rumbold

Sir Horace Rumbold, 8th Baronet, GCB, GCMG, PC (2 July 1829 – 3 November 1913) was a British diplomat who was minister or ambassador to several countries. He succeeded his brother, Charles, as Baronet in 1877.

== Career ==
He was educated privately in Paris and (no examinations being then required) was introduced into the diplomatic service by Lord Palmerston in 1849. He was posted in the same year as attaché to Turin (then the capital of the Kingdom of Sardinia-Piedmont) and subsequently served at Paris, Frankfurt, Stuttgart, Vienna and Ragusa. In December 1858 he was appointed secretary of the legation in China and went there in March 1859. The minister, Frederick Bruce, sent him back to England in January 1860 to report to the British government the active resistance which was offered to the progress of the British mission to the Chinese capital. This report led to the Anglo-French expedition to Peking (Beijing) in that year (in the second phase of the Second Opium War).

Rumbold then held a succession of further posts as secretary of legation or embassy in Athens, Bern, St Petersburg and Constantinople. He then became Minister to Chile 1872–78; to the Swiss Confederation 1878–79; to Argentina 1879–81; to Sweden and Norway 1881–84; to Greece 1884–88; to the Netherlands 1888–96; and finally Ambassador to Austria 1896–1900.

== Family ==
Rumbold was the fourth son of Sir William Rumbold, 3rd Baronet (1787–1833), and Henrietta Elizabeth née Parkyns (1789–1830). His wives were Caroline Burney (d. 1872), daughter of US Minister to Bern George Harrington, and Louisa Anne (d. 1940), daughter of Thomas Russell Crampton. His sons were the diplomat Horace, who succeeded as 9th baronet, and Hugo, a theatrical scenery and costume designer.

== Honours ==
Horace Rumbold succeeded to the Rumbold baronetcy on the death of his brother, the 7th Baronet, in 1877. He was knighted KCMG in 1886, promoted to GCMG in 1892 and given the additional honour of GCB in the Queen's Birthday Honours of 1897. He was made a Privy Counsellor in 1896.

== Publications ==
- The Great Silver River: Notes of a Residence in Buenos Ayres in 1880 and 1881, John Murray, London, 1890
- An English Tribute to the Emperor Francis Joseph in The National Review, London, November 1902
- Recollections of a Diplomatist, Edward Arnold, London, 1902
- Further Recollections of a Diplomatist, Edward Arnold, London, 1903
- Final Recollections of a Diplomatist [1885-1900], Edward Arnold, London, 1905
- The Austrian Court in the Nineteenth Century, Methuen, London, 1909

== Notes ==
Diplomatic posts
Preceded by William Taylour Thomson as Chargé d'Affaires and Consul-General	Minister Resident and Consul-General to the Republic of Chile; 1872–78	Succeeded by Hon. Francis Pakenham
Preceded by Edwin Corbett	Envoy Extraordinary and Minister Plenipotentiary to the Swiss Confederation; 1878–79	Succeeded by Henry Bax-Ironside
Preceded by Clare Ford	Envoy Extraordinary and Minister Plenipotentiary to the Argentine Republic; 1879–81	Succeeded by George Glynne Petre
Preceded by Hon. Edward Erskine	Envoy Extraordinary and Minister Plenipotentiary to the King of Sweden and Norway; 1881–84	Succeeded by Edwin Corbett
Preceded by Clare Ford	Envoy Extraordinary and Minister Plenipotentiary to the King of the Hellenes; 1884–88	Succeeded by Hon. Edmund Monson
Preceded by Hon. William Stuart	Envoy Extraordinary and Minister Plenipotentiary to the King of the Netherlands; 1888–96	Succeeded by Sir Henry Howard
Preceded by Sir Edmund Monson	Ambassador Extraordinary and Plenipotentiary to His Majesty The Emperor of Austria, King of Hungary; 1896–1900	Succeeded by Sir Francis Richard Plunkett
Baronetage of Great Britain
Preceded by Charles Hale Rumbold	Baronet (of Woodhall); 1877–1913	Succeeded by Horace Rumbold
