= Clifford Norton =

British diplomat (1991–1990)

Sir Clifford Norton KCMG CVO

British Ambassador to Greece
- In office 1946–1951
- Preceded by: Sir Reginald Leeper
- Succeeded by: Sir Charles Peake

Personal details
- Born: 17 July 1891
- Died: 6 December 1990 (aged 99)
- Education: Queen’s College, Oxford
- Occupation: Diplomat

Sir Clifford John Norton (17 July 1891 – 6 December 1990) was a British diplomat who served as Ambassador to Greece from 1946 to 1951.

== Early life and education ==
Norton was born on 17 July 1891, the son of the Rev George Norton and Clara née Dewey. He was educated at Rugby School and Queen’s College, Oxford.

== Career ==
Norton was commissioned into the Suffolk Regiment on the outbreak of World War I and served in Gallipoli and Palestine. In 1917, he was attached to the general staff of the Egyptian expeditionary force as Captain. From 1919 to 1920, he served as political officer in Damascus, Daraa, and Haifa.

Norton entered the Foreign Office in 1921. He was appointed third secretary and rose to second secretary in 1925. After working in the Foreign Office news department, he became private secretary to the permanent under-secretary of state for foreign affairs Sir Robert Vansittart, serving in the post from 1930 to 1937. According to The Times, "Norton was involved in all the vagaries of what came to be known as the policy of appeasement."

Norton's first foreign posting was to Poland in 1937 as acting counsellor at the British Embassy in Warsaw, becoming counsellor in 1939 after the German invasion of the country. In September 1939, he was evacuated with the embassy staff to Britain via Romania, and in January 1940 was back in the Foreign Office where he remained until 1942.

Norton then served as minister in Berne from 1942 until 1946 when he was appointed Ambassador to Greece. In 1943, Norton soon faced difficulties as civil conflict broke out with fighting between communist and royalist resistance groups which subsequently led to the Greek Civil War. He remained in the post until his retirement from the diplomatic service in 1951, and on his departure from Greece he was made an honorary citizen of Athens.

== Personal life and death ==
Norton married Noel Hughes. There were no children. In 1951 he retired and he and his wife moved to 21a Carlyle Square. His wife died in 1972. He continued to live at 21a Carlyle Square until his death.

In retirement Norton served as UK alternate delegate to the United Nations in 1952 and 1953; he was president of the Anglo-Swiss Society; and was elected an honorary fellow of Queen's College, Oxford.

Norton died on 6 December 1990, aged 99.

== Honours ==
Norton was appointed Companion of the Order of St Michael and St George (CMG) in the 1933 Birthday Honours, and promoted to Knight Commander in the 1946 New Year Honours. In 1937, he was appointed Commander of the Royal Victorian Order (CVO).

== See also ==
Greece–United Kingdom relations

Diplomatic posts
Preceded by Sir Reginald Leeper	British Ambassador to Greece; 1946–1951	Succeeded by Sir Charles Peake
