= Jeremy Thomas (diplomat) =

British diplomat (1931–2022)

Sir Jeremy Thomas KCMG

British Ambassador to Greece
- In office 1985–1989
- Preceded by: Sir Peregrine Rhodes
- Succeeded by: Sir David Miers

British Ambassador to Luxembourg
- In office 1979–1982
- Preceded by: Lord Wright of Richmond
- Succeeded by: Sir Humphrey Maud

Personal details
- Born: 1 June 1931
- Died: 28 September 2022 (aged 91) Bosham, West Sussex
- Children: 3
- Education: Merton College, Oxford
- Occupation: Diplomat

Sir Jeremy Cashel Thomas (1 June 1931 – 28 September 2022 ) was a British diplomat. He served as British Ambassador to Luxembourg from 1979 to 1982 and British Ambassador to Greece from 1985 to 1989.

== Early life and education ==
Thomas was born on 1 June 1931, the son of Rev H. C. Thomas and Margaret Betty née Humby. He was educated at Eton College and Merton College, Oxford.

== Career ==
After serving with the 16th/5th The Queen's Royal Lancers from 1949 to 1951, Thomas entered the Foreign Office in 1954, and served in Singapore, Rome and Belgrade. From 1970 to 1974, he was head of the Personnel Operations Department at the Foreign and Commonwealth Office (FCO). He was then appointed counsellor and head of chancery of the UK delegation at the United Nations Organisation in New York, serving in the post from 1974 to 1976.

Thomas then returned to the FCO as head of the Permanent Under-Secretary's Department, serving from 1977 to 1979. From 1979 to 1982, he served as Ambassador to Luxembourg before returning to the FCO as Assistant Under-Secretary for Foreign and Commonwealth Affairs (Economic) serving from 1982 to 1985. In 1985, he was appointed Ambassador to Greece, a post he held until his retirement in 1989.

== Personal life and death ==
Thomas married Diana Mary Summerhayes in 1957 and they had three sons. Thomas was a keen sailor and in retirement was chairman of the Chichester Harbour Conservancy Advisory Committee and wrote The Rhythm of the Tide: tales through the ages of Chichester Harbour, published in 1999.

Thomas died on 28 September 2022 in Bosham, West Sussex aged 91.

== Honours ==
Thomas was appointed Companion of the Order of St Michael and St George (CMG) in the 1980 New Years Honours, and promoted to Knight Commander (KCMG) in the 1987 New Year Honours.

== See also ==
- Greece–United Kingdom relations
- Luxembourg–United Kingdom relations

Diplomatic posts
Preceded by Lord Wright of Richmond	British Ambassador to Luxembourg; 1979–1982	Succeeded by Sir Humphrey Maud
Preceded by Sir Peregrine Rhodes	British Ambassador to Greece; 1985–1989	Succeeded by Sir David Miers
