= Charles Peake =

British diplomat (1897–1958)

Sir Charles Peake GCMG MC
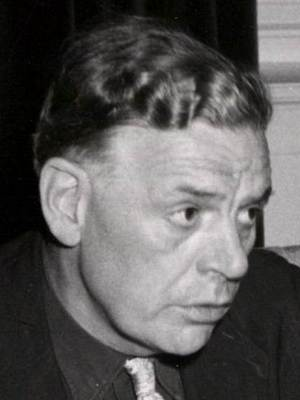

British Ambassador to Greece
- In office 1951–1957
- Preceded by: Sir Clifford Norton
- Succeeded by: Sir Roger Allen

British Ambassador to Yugoslavia|British Ambassador to Serbia|British Ambassador to Yugoslavia
- In office 1946–1952
- Preceded by: Sir Ralph Stevenson
- Succeeded by: Sir Ivo Mallet

Personal details
- Born: 2 January 1897 Leicester, England
- Died: 10 April 1958 (aged 61) London, England
- Occupation: Diplomat
- Awards: Military Cross

Military service
- Allegiance: United Kingdom
- Branch/service: British Army
- Years of service: 1915–1918
- Rank: Lieutenant
- Unit: Royal Leicestershire Regiment
- Battles/wars: First World War

Sir Charles Brinsley Pemberton Peake GCMG MC (2 January 1897 – 10 April 1958) was a British diplomat.

== Early life and career ==
Peake served in the Royal Leicestershire Regiment during the First World War, being commissioned into the 1/4th Battalion in 1915. He was awarded the Military Cross in June 1916. His service also included attachment to the regiment's 9th Battalion. Peake was discharged in 1918.

He joined Her Majesty's Diplomatic Service in 1922. His first appointment was in Sofia, subsequently being posted to Tokyo, Paris, Washington, D.C., and Tangier.

In 1939, Peake became head of the Foreign Office News Department and chief press adviser at the Ministry of Information. In 1941 he was posted to Washington as Acting Counsellor.

In 1946 he became Ambassador to Yugoslavia, before his appointment as Ambassador to Greece in 1951. He served in the position until 1957.

He was invested as a Knight Grand Cross of the Order of St Michael and St George in 1956.

=== Personal life ===
Peake married Catherine Marie Knight, with whom he had four sons.

== Archives ==
Churchill Archives Centre holds several diaries written by Charles Peake in 1941, 1954, and 1956-7. The National Archives, Borthwick Institute for Archives, Lincoln College Archives, University of Oxford and the Royal Institute of International Affairs, also hold papers relating to Peake's work.
