= William Geraghty =

Sir William Geraghty, KCB (12 February 1917 – 7 May 1977) was a British civil servant. Educated at Emanuel School Battersea and Brasenose College, Oxford, he entered the civil service in 1939, joining the War Office. He served in the Army from 1940 to 1945, seeing service with the Royal Artillery and the Royal Horse Artillery, rising to the rank of major. Returning to the War Office after the war, he was eventually appointed Inspector of Establishments. He then served in the Cabinet Office, before promotion to deputy secretary. Service in the Ministry of Aviation and the Ministry of Technology followed, before he served as Controller of Personnel in the Procurement Executive of the Ministry of Defence. He was Second Permanent Secretary at the Ministry of Defence with responsibility for administration from 1975 to 1976.

Government offices
Preceded by Sir John Wilson	Second Permanent Secretary of the Ministry of Defence (Administration); 1975–1976	Succeeded by Sir Arthur Hockaday (as Second Permanent Secretary)
