= John Hughes (British diplomat) =

British diplomat (born 1947)

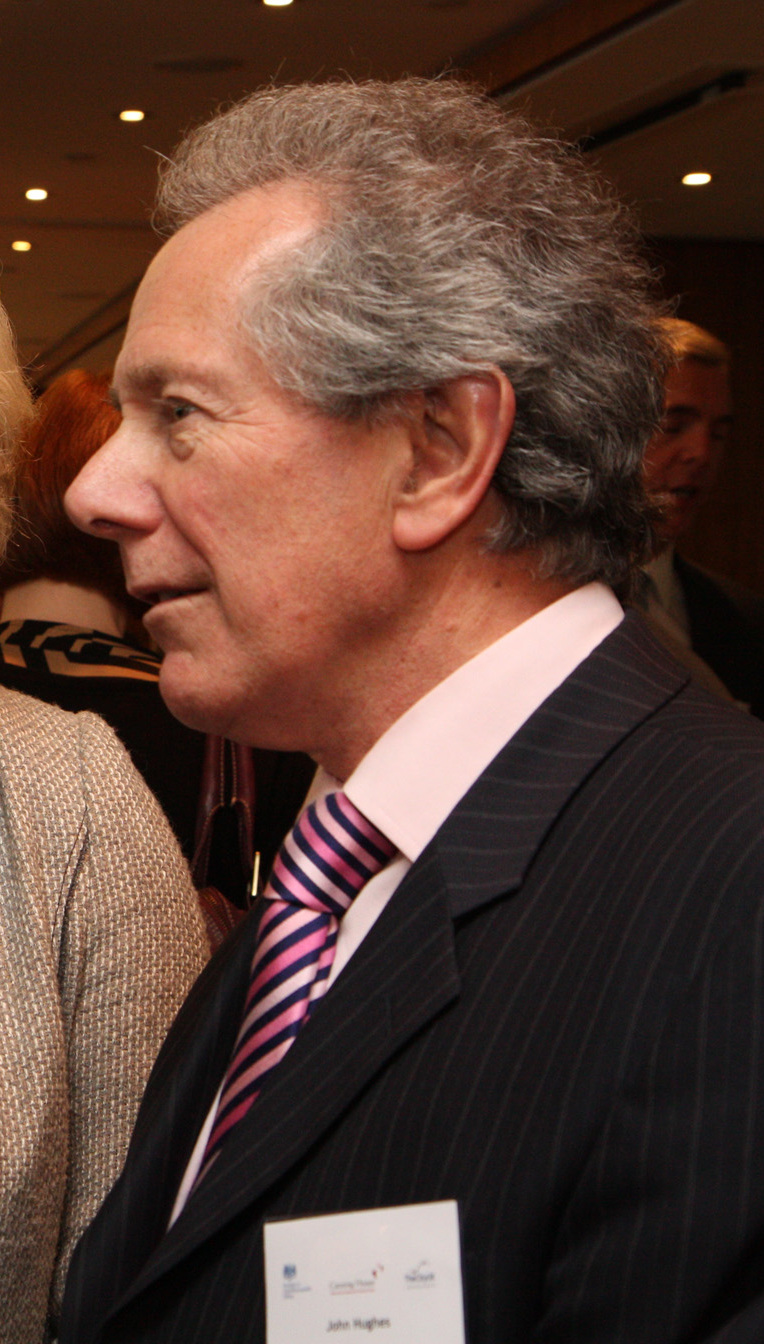
John Hughes, was a retired British diplomat.

Edgar John Hughes (born 27 July 1947) is a retired British diplomat and former British Ambassador to Venezuela, Argentina and Paraguay.

In retirement, he has been a governor of Atlantic College, Chair of the Marshall Aid Commemoration Commission and Chair of Canning House. He is currently Chair of the British Argentine Chamber of Commerce and of Latamconsult.

Hughes has also held Fellowships in London University, including as a Senior Fellow at the London School of Economics and as Professor in Practice at LSE Ideas.

Born in south Wales, Hughes was educated at Lewis School, Pengam, and the London School of Economics BSc Econ. He went on to receive his master's degree from Lehigh University in Pennsylvania and his PhD from Pembroke College, Cambridge, in 1974 with a dissertation entitled Anglo-American relations and the formation of the United Nations organisation.

Hughes was a career British diplomat for 35 years, serving primarily in Embassies in the Western hemisphere (Santiago, Washington, D.C., Caracas, Buenos Aires). His European posting was as Deputy Ambassador in Norway.

In the Foreign and Commonwealth Office (FCO) he worked on trade negotiations (Air Services) and was the Change Manager for the British Diplomatic Service. He was also seconded to the Cabinet Office where he worked on the Middle East.

Hughes went on secondment to the private sector, working in BA Systems 1999-2000 and in Shell 2003–2004.

In 2000 Hughes was appointed HM Ambassador to Venezuela, where he served until 2003. He was then appointed HM Ambassador to Argentina in 2004, and in 2005 as non-resident HM Ambassador to Paraguay.

He became a Fellow of the Royal Society of Arts in 2011 and was elected as a Member of the Learned Society of Wales in 2020.

Hughes was appointed Commander of the Order of the British Empire (CBE) in the 2017 New Year Honours List.

Diplomatic posts
Preceded by Richard Wilkinson	British Ambassador to Venezuela; 2000–2003	Succeeded by Donald Lamont
Preceded by Sir Robin Christopher	British Ambassador to Argentina; 2004–2008	Succeeded by Shan Morgan
Preceded by Anthony Cantor	British Ambassador to Paraguay non-resident 2005–2008	Succeeded by Shan Morgan
