= David Miers =

British diplomat (born 1937)

Sir David Miers KBE CMG

British Ambassador to the Netherlands
- In office 1993–1996
- Preceded by: Sir Michael Jenkins
- Succeeded by: Dame Rosemary Spencer

British Ambassador to Greece
- In office 1989–1993
- Preceded by: Sir Jeremy Thomas
- Succeeded by: Oliver Miles

British Ambassador to Lebanon
- In office 1983–1985
- Preceded by: Sir David Roberts
- Succeeded by: Sir John Gray

Personal details
- Born: Henry David Alastair Capel Miers
- Occupation: Diplomat

Sir Henry David Alastair Capel Miers KBE CMG (born 10 January 1937), commonly known as Sir David Miers, is a British retired ambassador.

== Career ==
Miers was educated at Winchester College and University College, Oxford. He did National Service as an officer in the Queen's Own Cameron Highlanders, commissioning into the regiment in 1956. He joined Her Majesty's Diplomatic Service in 1961 and held appointments in Japan, Laos, France, Iran and at the Foreign Office in London, before becoming Ambassador to Lebanon in 1983. He served in that position until 1985.

In 1989, he was made Ambassador to Greece, before serving as Ambassador to the Netherlands between 1993 and 1996. Miers was invested as a Companion of the Order of St Michael and St George in 1979 and as a Knight Commander of the Order of the British Empire in 1985.
