= Josiah Crosby (diplomat) =

British diplomat

Sir Josiah Crosby KCMG KBE CIE (25 May 1880 – 4 December 1958) was a British diplomat. He was British Minister to Panama and Costa Rica from 1931 to 1934 and British Minister to Siam from 1934 to 1941.

== Biography ==
Born in Falmouth, the son of a master mariner, Crosby was educated at the Royal Grammar School, Newcastle Upon Tyne and Gonville and Caius College, Cambridge, where he was a scholar and took first-class honours in the modern languages tripos in 1902. He joined the Consular Service in 1904 and served in Siam in various capacities until 1917, when he was appointed consul at Saigon. After serving as acting consul-general at Bangkok in 1919–20, he was consul-general at Saigon in 1920, and consul-general at Batavia from 1921 to 1931.

In 1931, Crosby was appointed British minister to Panama, and in 1934 he returned to Siam as British minister there. He retired in 1941, and was imprisoned in Siam for a time during the Second World War. In 1944, he published Siam: The Crossroads, a book about the country.

Crosby was appointed OBE in 1918, CIE in the 1919 Birthday Honours, KBE in the 1928 Birthday Honours, and KCMG in the 1942 New Year Honours.
