= Leonard Scopes =

British diplomat (1912–1997)

Sir Leonard Arthur Scopes, KCVO, CMG, OBE (19 March 1912 – 30 June 1997) was a British diplomat who served as British ambassador to Nepal and Paraguay.

== Biography ==
The son of Arthur Edward Scopes and Jessie Russell Hendry, Scopes was educated at St Dunstan’s College and Gonville and Caius College, Cambridge. He joined HM Consular Service in 1933, becoming Vice-Consul at Antwerp in 1933, at Saigon in 1935, at Canton in 1937, Acting Consul at Surabaya in 1941, Vice-Consul, then Consul at Lourenço Marques in 1942, and Consul at Skoplje and Ljubljana in 1945. He was appointed Consul and First Secretary (Secretary) at Bogotá in 1947, Assistant in the United Nations (Economic and Social) Department of the Foreign Office in 1950, Counsellor at Jakarta in 1952, and Foreign Service inspector in 1954.

He was British Ambassador to Nepal from 1957 to 1962 and British Ambassador to Paraguay from 1962 to 1967. He was a member of the United Nations Joint Inspection Unit at Geneva from 1968 to 1971.

Scopes was appointed OBE in 1946, CMG in 1957, and KCVO in 1961.

Scopes married Brunhilde Slater Rolfe in 1938; they had two sons and two daughters.
