= William Stuart (1824–1896) =

British diplomat (1824–1896)

The Honourable Sir William Stuart KCMG, CB

Envoy Extraordinary and Minister Plenipotentiary to the King of the Netherlands
- In office 1877–1888
- Preceded by: Hon. Edward Harris
- Succeeded by: Sir Horace Rumbold, Bt

Envoy Extraordinary and Minister Plenipotentiary to the King of the Hellenes
- In office 1872–1877
- Preceded by: Hon. Edward Erskine
- Succeeded by: Edwin Corbett

Minister Plenipotentiary to the Argentine Republic
- In office 1868–1872
- Preceded by: William Lowther
- Succeeded by: Lionel Sackville-West

Personal details
- Born: 3 March 1824
- Died: 1 April 1896 (aged 72)
- Spouse: Georgina Tremenheere (before 1896)
- Relations: Charles Stuart, 12th Lord Blantyre (brother)
- Parent(s): Robert Stuart, 11th Lord Blantyre; Fanny Mary Rodney
- Education: Eton College
- Alma mater: Trinity College, Cambridge

The Hon. Sir William Stuart, KCMG, CB (3 March 1824 – 1 April 1896) was a British diplomat who served as Minister to Argentina, Greece and The Netherlands.

== Early life ==
William Stuart was the third son of Maj.-Gen. Robert Walter Stuart, 11th Lord Blantyre and the former Frances Mary Rodney, a daughter of Capt. Hon. John Rodney (son of Admiral George Rodney, 1st Baron Rodney). His older brother was Charles Stuart, 12th Lord Blantyre who married Evelyn, the second daughter of George Sutherland-Leveson-Gower, 2nd Duke of Sutherland.

He was educated at Eton College and Trinity College, Cambridge.

== Career ==
He entered the Diplomatic Service in 1845 as unpaid attaché in Paris, and continued unpaid for six years until 1851. In 1856 it fell to Stuart (by then with the rank of First Attaché at Paris) to carry back to London the Ratification, signed by the monarchs of the participating countries, of the Treaty of Paris (1856).

In 1856 Stuart began a series of posts as Secretary of Legation, first at Rio de Janeiro, then at Naples from 1859 until February 1861 when King Francis II was overthrown and the British legation at Naples was closed. Stuart was then appointed to Athens in October 1861, to Washington, D.C. in October 1862, to Constantinople in 1864 and to St Petersburg in 1866.

In 1868 Stuart was appointed Minister to the Argentine Republic, although in March 1871 he was in London acting as Protocolist to a conference on the European Commission of the Danube, when he was awarded the CB. In 1872 he was appointed to be Minister to Greece, and in 1877 to his final post as Minister to the Netherlands and Luxembourg. His duties there included negotiation of a bilateral treaty between Great Britain and Luxembourg on the extradition of criminals in 1880 (superseded by later European conventions, currently the European Arrest Warrant), and the North Sea Fisheries Convention of 1882. While at The Hague he was knighted a Knight Commander of the Order of St Michael and St George (KCMG) in the Queen's Birthday Honours of 1886. He retired in 1888.

== Personal life ==
Stuart married Georgina Tremenheere (1848–1901), the eldest daughter of Maj.-Gen. G. B. Tremenheere.

Sir William died 1 April 1896. Lady Stuart died, aged 52, on 3 January 1901.

Diplomatic posts
Preceded by William Lowther	Minister Plenipotentiary to the Argentine Republic; 1868–1872	Succeeded by Lionel Sackville-West
Preceded by Hon. Edward Erskine	Envoy Extraordinary and Minister Plenipotentiary to the King of the Hellenes; 1872–1877	Succeeded by Edwin Corbett
Preceded by Hon. Edward Harris	Envoy Extraordinary and Minister Plenipotentiary to the King of the Netherlands; 1877–1888	Succeeded by Sir Horace Rumbold, Bt
