= Francis Bertie, 1st Viscount Bertie of Thame =

British diplomat (1844–1919)

The Right Honourable The Viscount Bertie of Thame GCB GCMG GCVO PC
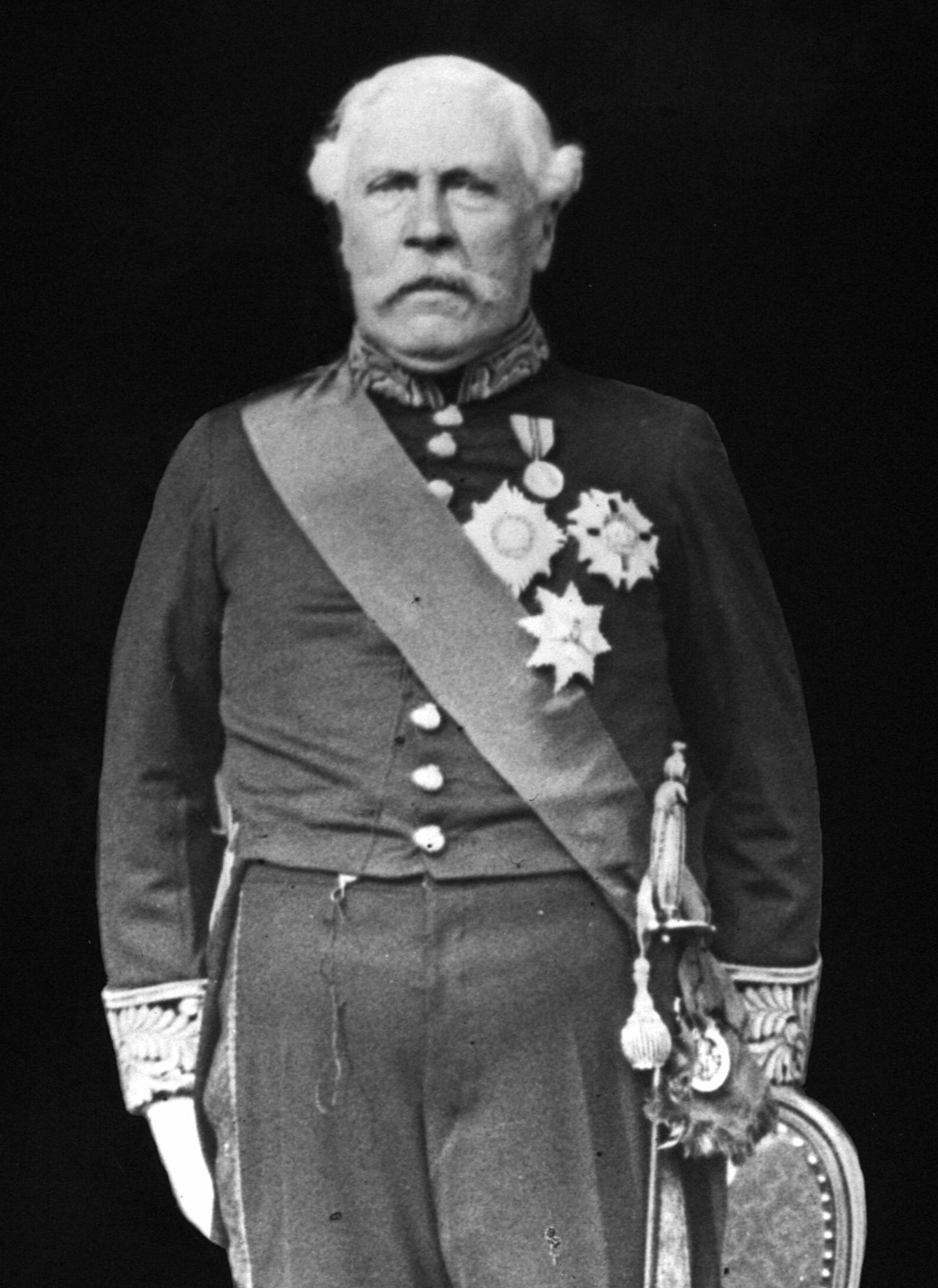
- Lord Bertie of Thame, 1915.

British Ambassador to France
- In office 1905–1918
- Monarchs: Edward VII; George V
- Preceded by: Sir Edmund Monson, Bt
- Succeeded by: The Earl of Derby

Personal details
- Born: 17 August 1844
- Died: 26 September 1919 (aged 75)
- Spouse: Lady Feodorowna Cecilia Wellesley (1838–1920)
- Children: 1
- Parent(s): Montagu Bertie, 6th Earl of Abingdon; Elizabeth Harcourt

Francis Leveson Bertie, 1st Viscount Bertie of Thame, GCB, GCMG, GCVO, PC (/ˈbɑːrti ... ˈteɪm/ "barty of tame"; 17 August 1844 – 26 September 1919) was a British diplomat. He was Ambassador to Italy between 1903 and 1905 and Ambassador to France between 1905 and 1918.

== Background and education ==
Bertie was the second son of the 6th Earl of Abingdon and Elizabeth Harcourt, daughter of George Harcourt. He was educated at Eton. From his great grandmother Charlotte Warren he had Dutch and Huguenot ancestral roots from the Schuyler family, the Van Cortlandt family, and the Delancey family of British North America.

== Diplomatic career ==
Bertie entered the Foreign Office in 1863. From 1874 to 1880 he served as Private Secretary to Robert Bourke, the Under-Secretary of State for Foreign Affairs, and in 1878 attended the Congress of Berlin. He served as acting senior clerk in the Eastern department from 1882 to 1885, and then later as senior clerk and assistant under-secretary in that department. In 1902 he was rewarded for his services by being made a Knight Commander of the Order of the Bath (KCB) in the 1902 Coronation Honours list published on 26 June 1902. He received the knighthood in a private audience with King Edward VII on 2 August, during the King's convalescence on board HMY Victoria and Albert.

In January 1903, Bertie was appointed Ambassador to Italy, and he was received by the King of Italy to present his credentials on 5 February 1903. He was appointed a Privy Counsellor in March the same year. Bertie served in Italy only two years, as in 1905 he was moved to the more important post of Ambassador to France, a post previously held by his father-in-law, Lord Cowley. Bertie would hold the Paris embassy for the next thirteen years.

Having spent most of his career in the Foreign Office, he initially had some trouble adjusting to the role of ambassador, where he had far less control over the development of policy but in his time at Paris Bertie was able to play a substantial role in strengthening the Entente Cordiale between France and Britain into a genuine alliance, encouraging strong British backing for France during the Moroccan Crises of 1905 and 1911. During these years, he was also showered with honours, being made Knight Grand Cross of the Royal Victorian Order (GCVO) in 1903, a Knight Grand Cross of the Order of Saint Michael and Saint George (GCMG) in 1904, and a Knight Grand Cross of the Order of the Bath (GCB) in 1908, as well as receiving the French Legion of Honour.

Bertie's career coincided with that of Sir Edward Grey at the Foreign Office, his immediate superior, and the wider fortunes of the Liberal governments of Sir Henry Campbell-Bannerman and H. H. Asquith. There are a large number of extant official letters marked "very confidential" that prove an intensive ongoing diplomacy on behalf of the Entente in the protracted period that preceded the First World War. As early as 1906 there were discussions about the possibility of a German invasion of France, yet always the proviso that it was in doubt, "that matters might be brought to a point in which a pacific issue would be difficult." However, giving a positive assurance to France might be dependent on the circumstances. Bertie negotiated closely with Théophile Delcassé the foreign minister "toute occasion de concerter avec le Gouvernement Francais," warning them of the revulsion for war in France. He was careful always not to "cause offence to Germany" which characterised the effects of a diplomatic round shuttling between capital cities. David Owen argues that this placed too great a reliance on the Admiralty and War Office to promise unequivocal support of a British Expeditionary Force. It was his view that Germany would try to dissuade France from our friendship. He was of the school that believed that reductions in Naval estimates would not appease German preparations for aggression.

When Clemenceau became Prime Minister in France he pledged never to break the agreements (rompre des accords) with Britain. Bertie was concerned about the integrity of secret diplomatic lines of communication and the prompt arrival of dispatches. He was not present at the leaders meeting at the embassy on 7 April 1907; which was a worry for the francophile ambassador. One dispatch of April 1911 was so sensitive that it has since been destroyed by archivists: but it is clear that under Asquith, military leaders questioned Grey's competence; one of these critics was Bertie. His military attache, Colonel Fairholme, clearly believed the French would outflank a German army on the frontier, which greatly exercised Bertie's mind "respecting strategical problems." Bertie had played his part in diffusing the crises off the coast of Morocco, but down the coast in Portugal, the German influence was greater. Grey refused to pressure Lisbon to sell their colonies, leaving the Germans to fill the diplomatic vacuum. However, the newly established Union of South Africa cried foul, as Delagoa Bay in Mozambique represented a strategic naval base area that could not be ceded to Germany. Bertie was reassured, but had his own critics who were most disparaging of his performance, and failure to keep abreast of modern developments of politics and strategy. Bertie was an old school diplomat, admired protocol and court precedents, was reluctant to go beyond his own prescribed powers. In a series of letters at the end of 1911/12, he found to his cost that francophiles were dead set against Paul Wolff Metternich's 'satanic invitation.' In fact, as time went on, he became more sceptical of the Haldane Mission as foolish because it threatened the "excellent position" in Paris. By February 1912 it had become clear to him that Germany was still the problem; not France. In competing with the British Empire, Germany sought to acquire lands in southern Africa from Portugal, France, Belgium and Britain, in addition to promising the Portuguese government financial support. Bertie blamed Admiral Tirpitz's sabre-rattling belligerence in the Persian Gulf, where it coincidentally met with the Berlin-Baghdad Railway.

He sold the manor of North Weston (now in Great Haseley) and his lands there in 1913, and the estate was divided up.

Bertie was still ambassador in Paris when the First World War broke out in August 1914. He was raised to the peerage as Baron Bertie of Thame, in the County of Oxford, in 1915. During the war he was frequently bypassed by special missions directly from the British government, particularly the military mission of Lord Esher, with whom he also came into personal conflict. After the February Revolution in Russia he advised the British government against the deposed Romanovs being allowed to go into exile in France as the ex-Empress Alexandra was perceived as pro-German.

When Bertie fell ill in April 1918, he was replaced by the Secretary of State for War, Lord Derby, and returned to England. On his retirement, Bertie was made Viscount Bertie of Thame, in the County of Oxford. In June 1919, he sold off the manors of Beckley and Horton-cum-Studley, Oxfordshire, which he had inherited from his father. He never fully recovered from his illness, dying in London on 26 September 1919.

== Family ==
Bertie married Lady Feodorowna Cecilia Wellesley (1838–1920), daughter of the 1st Earl Cowley and grandniece of the 1st Duke of Wellington, in 1874. They had one child: Vere Bertie, 2nd Viscount Bertie of Thame, who succeeded in the viscountcy.

== Arms ==
Coat of arms of Francis Bertie, 1st Viscount Bertie of Thame
Crest A Saracen's head affrontee couped at the shoulders Proper ducally crowned Or and charged on the chest with a fret Azure. Escutcheon Argent three battering-rams fessewise in pale Proper armed and garnished Azure. Supporters Dexter a friar vested in russet grey with a crutch and rosary all Proper, sinister a savage Proper wreathed about the temples and waist with leaves Vert, and each charged on the breast with a fret Azure a crescent for difference. Motto Virtus Ariete Fortior (Valour Is Stronger Than A Battering Ram)

== Primary sources ==
- Bertie, Francis. The Diary of Lord Bertie of Thame, 1914–1918 edited by Lady Algernon Gordon Lennox. (2 vol; London: Hodder and Stoughton, 1924).vol 1 online also online vol 2

== Secondary sources ==
- Hamilton, Keith (1990). Bertie of Thame: Edwardian Ambassador. Woodbridge, Suffolk: Royal Historical Society. ISBN 0-86193-217-X.
- Hamilton, Keith (2004–2007). Bertie, Francis Leveson, first Viscount Bertie of Thame. Oxford: Oxford Dictionary of National Biography.
- Owen, David (2014). The Hidden Perspective: The Military Perspective 1906-1914. Haus Publishing. ISBN 978-1-908323-66-8.
- Steiner, Zara S. (1969). The Foreign Office and Foreign Policy 1898-1914. Cambridge. ISBN 9780521076548.
- Wilson, K. M. "Bertie of Thame: Edwardian Ambassador." English Historical Review 109.430 (1994): 238–239.

Diplomatic posts
Preceded by The Lord Currie	British Ambassador to Italy; 1903–1905	Succeeded by Edwin Egerton
Preceded by Sir Edmund Monson	British Ambassador to France; 1905–1918	Succeeded by The Earl of Derby
Peerage of the United Kingdom
New creation	Viscount Bertie of Thame; 1918–1919	Succeeded by Vere Frederick Bertie
New creation	Baron Bertie of Thame; 1915–1919	Succeeded by Vere Frederick Bertie
