= Anthony Clarke (businessman) =

British businessman

- Born: Anthony Richard Clarke; 1953 (age 72–73)
- Occupations: Chartered accountant, chartered secretary, and businessman
- Known for: CEO of Angel Capital Group

Anthony Richard Clarke (born 1953) is a British chartered accountant, chartered secretary, and businessman. Clarke is the chief executive officer of Angel Capital Group and the managing director of London Business Angels.

Clarke qualified as a chartered accountant and chartered secretary with Deloitte Haskins & Sells (now PricewaterhouseCoopers) in 1980. He then had a variety of jobs, including chief executive of Carroll Industries Corporation in the early 1990s. Clarke has been involved with the venture capital/business angel sector since 1995. Between 2002 and 2009 he was managing director of GLE Growth Capital.

Clarke is the co-founder of the Enterprise Capital Fund, Seraphim Capital, and was chairman of the UK Business Angels Association from 2004 to July 2012.

In April 2017, Anthony Clarke and Jenny Tooth sold Angel Capital Group, which owns early-stage technology backer London Business Angels, to state-owned start-up advisory and loans provider Newable.
