= Ivo Mallet =

British diplomat

Sir William Ivo Mallet GBE KCMG (7 April 1900 – 7 December 1988) was a British diplomat who served as ambassador to Yugoslavia and Spain.

== Career ==
Mallet was educated at Harrow School and Balliol College, Oxford. He joined HM Diplomatic Service with the rank of Third Secretary in 1925. He served in Constantinople, Angora, Berlin and Rome before, at the end of 1938, being appointed assistant Private Secretary to the Foreign Secretary, Lord Halifax. He held that post until 1941, then returned to the Foreign Office with the rank of acting Counsellor; at the end of the war he was Head of the Personnel Department of the Foreign Office.

In 1946, he was appointed Consul-General at Tangier. In 1949 he returned to the Foreign Office as Assistant Under-Secretary. He was the UK representative at talks toward a peace treaty with Austria, although negotiations were slow due to the Cold War and the final Austrian State Treaty was signed only in 1955. Meanwhile, Mallet served as ambassador to Yugoslavia 1951–54, where he was involved in lengthy negotiations on the fate of Trieste which at one point brought Italy and Yugoslavia close to war, and as ambassador to Spain 1954–60, also a difficult time under General Franco. In 1960 he retired to Switzerland where he died in 1988.

== Honours ==
Ivo Mallet was appointed CMG in the New Year Honours of 1945, knighted KCMG in 1951 on his appointment to Yugoslavia and given the additional, higher knighthood of GBE in the New Year Honours of 1960.

== Offices held ==
Diplomatic posts
Preceded by Charles Peake	Ambassador Extraordinary and Plenipotentiary at Belgrade; 1951–1954	Succeeded by Sir Frank Roberts
Preceded by John Balfour	Ambassador Extraordinary and Plenipotentiary at Madrid; 1954–1960	Succeeded by Sir George Labouchère

== Family ==
Ivo Mallet was one of three children of the historian and Liberal politician Sir Charles Mallet (1862–1947), who was the grandson of Jacques Mallet du Pan (1749–1800).

In 1929, in Warsaw, Ivo Mallet married Marie-Angèle Wierusz-Kowalska (daughter of the Polish ambassador to the Vatican Józef Wierusz-Kowalski and his wife Leonia, countess Rostworowska). They had two sons and a daughter, Joan, who in 1955 married the British diplomat Robert Alexander Farquharson (who was also to be ambassador to Yugoslavia 1977–80). Lady Mallet died in 1985.

== Links ==
- MALLET, Sir (William) Ivo, Who Was Who, A & C Black, 1920–2008; online edn, Oxford University Press, Dec 2012
- Sir Ivo Mallet – Envoy in Madrid in the chilly Franco years (obituary), The Times, London, 9 December 1988, page 16
