= Carlyle Square =

Garden square in Chelsea, London

Coordinates: 51°29′12.04″N 0°10′21.59″W

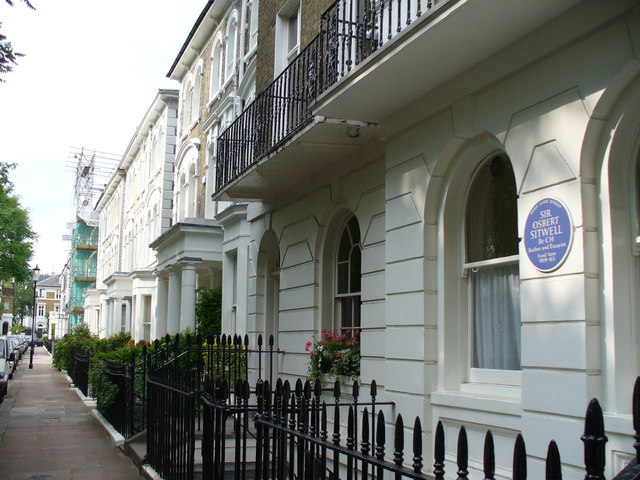
Carlyle Square in June 2007.

Carlyle Square is a garden square off the King's Road in London's Chelsea district, SW3. The square was laid out on market gardens and was originally called Oakley Square. It was later named in honour of the writer Thomas Carlyle in 1872.

The garden at the centre of the square was the site of the annual summer party held by the broadcaster David Frost. The party attracted many notable people from British and international society, politics and broadcasting, and was described by the Daily Telegraph in 2008 as "an important fixture for the London media and political party season".

1, 2 and 3, and 40, 41 and 42 Carlyle Square are listed Grade II on the National Heritage List for England in two groups.

== Notable residents ==
No. 2 was the home of the literary brothers Osbert and Sacheverell Sitwell in the early 1920s. The composer William Walton lived for many years with the Sitwells at Carlyle Square.

No. 6 was the home of actress Sybil Thorndike from 1921 to 1932.

10 was the home of the Irish novelist Edna O'Brien from 1972 until approximately 1980. She bought the six-bedroom townhouse using her earnings from the 1972 film X, Y & Zee and operated her famous literary salon from the address. In her autobiography, O'Brien details purchasing No. 10 Carlyle Square for £39,000 using her film payout and later details its sale.

18 Carlyle Square was the home of the spy Kim Philby and his family for several years.

21 was the home of Victor Cavendish-Bentinck, 9th Duke of Portland, who served as Chairman of the Joint Intelligence Committee during World War II.

21a was the home of British diplomat Clifford Norton from 1951 until his death in 1990.

22 was the town residence of James Hugh Campbell (1889–1934), grand-nephew and heir to Prime Minister Henry Campbell-Bannerman, and later his widow, Flora Shannon Campbell (née Clift), who lived there until her death in 1983. (Note: The London Gazette or contemporary Post Office London Directories (1920–1980) lists Mrs. J. H. Campbell / Flora S. Campbell at 22 Carlyle Square.) It was subsequently the home of the broadcaster David Frost and his family who lived at No. 22 for 25 years.

26 was the residence of co-founder of the hairdressing chain Toni & Guy, Toni Mascolo, paid £8 million for a corner house on the square in 2010. The property was sold in 2021 to venture capitalist Walter Kortschak for £20.2 million.

The Irish nationalist MP William Stacpoole died at his Carlyle Square residence, Cupola House, in 1879.
