= William Barrington (diplomat) =

British diplomat

Sir William Augustus Curzon Barrington KCMG (28 January 1842 – 23 February 1922) was a British diplomat.

== Background ==
Born at Beckett Hall in Berkshire, he was the third son of William Barrington, 6th Viscount Barrington, and his wife Jane Elizabeth, fourth daughter of Thomas Liddell, 1st Baron Ravensworth. His older brothers were George Barrington, 7th Viscount Barrington, and Percy Barrington, 8th Viscount Barrington. Having been previously in private schools in Cheam and in Woolwich, Barrington received his further education in Germany, in schools at Mannheim and at Bonn.

== Diplomatic career ==
Barrington joined the Diplomatic Service in 1860. After four years he was promoted to a 3rd secretary and in 1870 to a 2nd secretary. He was sent as secretary of legation to Buenos Aires in 1883 and was transferred to Budapest as consul-general two years later.

Barrington arrived as secretary of embassy in Madrid in 1888 and exchanged to Vienna after four years. In 1896, he became Envoy Extraordinary Minister Plenipotentiary to the Argentine Republic and simultaneously to the Republic of Paraguay. He was appointed a Knight Commander of the Order of St Michael and St George (KCMG) in the New Year Honours list 1901, and was knighted and invested as such by King Edward VII in person in February 1901. In March 1902 he was appointed Envoy Extraordinary and Minister Plenipotentiary to the King of Sweden and Norway, but he did not take up the position until that Autumn; after he was received by King Edward VII in early September, he arrived in Stockholm the following month. He served there until 1904.

== Later life ==
He was unmarried and died in 1922.

== Styles and honours ==
Styles

- 1842–1900: The Honourable William Barrington
- 1901–1922: The Honourable Sir William Barrington, KCMG

Honours

- KCMG: Knight Commander of the Most Distinguished Order of St Michael and St George - 1 January 1901 - New Year Honours list

Diplomatic posts
Preceded by Hon. Francis Pakenham	Envoy Extraordinary and Minister Plenipotentiary to the Argentine Republic and to the Republic of Paraguay; 1896–1902	Succeeded by William Haggard
Preceded by Sir Francis Pakenham	Envoy Extraordinary and Minister Plenipotentiary to the King of Sweden and Norway; 1902–1904	Succeeded by Sir Rennell Rodd
