= List of ambassadors of the United Kingdom to Argentina =

The ambassador of the United Kingdom to Argentina is the United Kingdom's foremost diplomatic representative in Argentina, and head of the UK's diplomatic mission there. The official title is His Britannic Majesty's Ambassador to the Argentine Republic.

From 1853, when the United Kingdom and the Republic of Paraguay established diplomatic relations, until 1941 the British Minister or Ambassador to Argentina was usually also accredited to Paraguay. Since 1941 a British Minister or Ambassador has been resident in Paraguay.

== Heads of mission ==
=== Ministers plenipotentiary ===
==== United Provinces of Rio de la Plata ====
- 1824–1826: Woodbine Parish, Consul-General; Chargé d'Affaires from 1825
- 1826–1828: Lord Ponsonby, Envoy Extraordinary and Minister Plenipotentiary
- 1828–1831: Woodbine Parish, Chargé d'Affaires
- 1831–1832: Henry Stephen Fox (appointed 1828)
- 1832–1834: Philip Yorke Gore (secretary of legation), Chargé d'Affaires
- 1834–1835: Hamilton Charles James Hamilton (appointed 1832)
- 1835–1844: John Mandeville

==== Argentine Confederation ====
- 1844–1845: William Gore Ouseley
- 1845–1847: Relations suspended
- 1847 (May–June): Lord Howden (minister to Brazil), special mission jointly with Count Walewski of France
- 1847–1848: Relations suspended
- 1848–1851: Henry Southern
- 1851–1854: Captain Robert Gore, Chargé d'Affaires and Consul-General
- 1854–1859: William Christie, Chargé d'Affaires and Consul-General from 1854, Minister Plenipotentiary from 1856
- 1859–1865: Edward Thornton

=== Argentine Republic ===
==== Ministers plenipotentiary ====
- 1865–1866: Richard Edwardes appointed but did not proceed
- 1866–1867: George Buckley Mathew
- 1867–1868: William Lowther
- 1868–1872: William Stuart

==== Envoys extraordinary and ministers plenipotentiary ====
- 1872–1878: Lionel Sackville-West
- 1878–1879: Clare Ford
- 1879–1881: Sir Horace Rumbold, 8th Baronet
- 1881–1884: George Petre
- 1884–1885: Edmund Monson
- 1885–1896: Francis Pakenham
- 1896–1902: William Barrington
- 1902–1906: Sir William Haggard (also Minister Plenipotentiary to Paraguay)
- 1906–1910: Walter Townley
- 1910–1919: Sir Reginald Tower
- 1919–1922: Ronald Macleay
- 1923–1925: Sir Beilby Alston
- 1925–1927: Sir Malcolm Robertson

==== Ambassadors extraordinary and plenipotentiary ====
- 1927–1929: Sir Malcolm Robertson
- 1930–1933: Sir Ronald Macleay
- 1933–1935: Sir Henry Chilton
- 1935–1937: Sir Nevile Henderson
- 1937–1942: Sir Esmond Ovey
- 1942–1946: David Victor Kelly (withdrawn for consultations 8 July 1944 – 25 April 1945)
- 1946–1948: Sir Reginald Leeper
- 1948–1952: Sir John Balfour
- 1951–1955: Sir Henry Mack
- 1955–1957: Sir Francis Evans
- 1957–1961: Sir John Ward
- 1961–1964: Sir George Middleton
- 1964–1969: Sir Michael Creswell
- 1969–1972: Sir Michael Hadow
- 1973–1975: Sir Donald Hopson
- 1975–1977: Sir Derrick Ashe
- 1980–1982: Anthony Williams

From 1982 to 1990, following the Falklands War, there were no diplomatic relations between the UK and Argentina. There was no Ambassador, but the embassy building remained open, as the British Interests Section of the Swiss Embassy, rather than as the British Embassy. The Argentine Embassy in London came under the Brazilian flag during the same period. Diplomatic relations were restored in 1990.

- 1990–1993: Humphrey Maud
- 1994–1997: Sir Peter Hall
- 1997–2000: William Marsden
- 2000–2004: Robin Christopher
- 2004–2008: John Hughes
- 2008–2012: Shan Morgan
- 2012–2016: John Freeman
- 2016–2021: Mark Kent
- 2021–2025: Kirsty Hayes
- 2025–present: David Cairns
