= Clare Ford =

English diplomat (1828–1899)

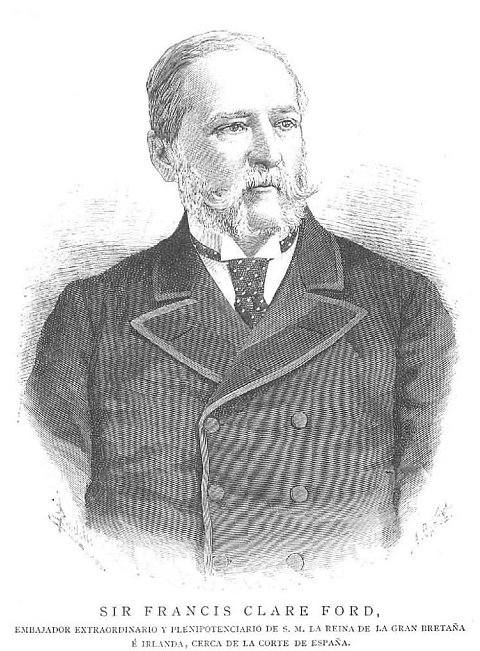
Sir Francis Clare Ford, in La Ilustración Española y Americana.

Sir Francis Clare Ford GCB GCMG PC (4 June 1828 – 31 January 1899) was an English diplomat from London.

== Early life ==
Ford was born at 32 Upper Brook Street, London, the son of writer Richard Ford and his wife, Harriet.

== Career ==
He was commissioned a lieutenant in the 4th Light Dragoons. He left the army in 1851 and entered the diplomatic service, becoming Secretary of Legation at Washington, D.C., where he was acting chargé d'affaires in 1867–1868. In 1871, he was appointed Secretary of Embassy at St Petersburg and in 1872, was transferred to Vienna. He represented the British government in 1875–77 at Halifax before the Halifax Fisheries Commission, by decision of which $5,500,000 was awarded to Great Britain for superior advantages obtained by the United States in the Washington fisheries treaty of 1871. In 1878–1879 he was Minister to the Argentine Republic and during a portion of the time to Uruguay also.

Ford was afterward appointed to similar posts at Rio de Janeiro and at Athens. In 1884 he became Minister (from 1887 Ambassador) to Spain; there, he acted as British commissioner in Paris in 1884 and 1885 to settle the Newfoundland fisheries question. In 1892, he was transferred to the Ottoman Empire and in 1893 to Italy. His services to British diplomacy won for him frequent official recognition, including appointment to the Privy Council in 1888.

== Personal life ==
Dead in Paris, he is buried in the cimetière de l'Ouest (Boulogne-Billancourt).

Diplomatic posts
Preceded by Lionel Sackville-West	Minister Plenipotentiary to Argentina; 1878–1879	Succeeded by Sir Horace Rumbold, 8th Baronet
Preceded by –	Minister Plenipotentiary and Consul-General to Uruguay; 1879	Succeeded by Hon. Edmund Monson
Preceded by George Buckley-Mathew	Envoy Extraordinary and Minister Plenipotentiary to Brazil; 1879–1881	Succeeded by Edwin Corbett
Preceded by Sir Robert Morier	Envoys Extraordinary and Ministers Plenipotentiary to Spain (Ambassador to Spain from 1887); 1884–1892	Succeeded by Sir Henry Drummond Wolff
Preceded by Sir William Arthur White	Ambassador to the Ottoman Empire; 1891–1892	Succeeded by Sir Philip Currie
Preceded by The Lord Vivian	Ambassador to Italy; 1892–1898	Succeeded by Sir Philip Currie
