= Butterfield Claims =

The Butterfield Claims refers to a 19th-century maritime dispute between the United States and Denmark.

In 1854, six ships belonging to Carlos Butterfield & Co., loaded with war material, cleared at New York for St. Thomas. Suspicion arose that they were destined for the rebels of Venezuela. However, due to evidence, they were cleared in a libel suit.

After arriving in the Danish West Indies, trouble again arose because of their suspicious character. The owners presented a large claim for damages because the vessels were detained by the Danish government. Thirty-four years of negotiations ended in a Danish-American arbitration treaty in 1888, as a result of which the claim was disallowed on the ground that the Danish government had observed strictly the neutrality laws involved.

== See also ==
- Sir Edmund Monson, arbitrator between an American shipping company and the government of Denmark (1888)
