= List of ambassadors of the United Kingdom to Paraguay =

The ambassador of the United Kingdom to Paraguay is the United Kingdom's foremost diplomatic representative to the Republic of Paraguay, and head of the UK's diplomatic mission in Asunción.

1842/43 George John Robert Gordon served as British envoy to Paraguay. Before 1941 the UK minister or ambassador to Argentina was also accredited to Paraguay. For ambassadors (etc.) before 1941, see List of ambassadors of the United Kingdom to Argentina. The British Embassy in Argentina again covered Paraguay remotely from 2005 to 2013.

== Heads of mission ==
=== Ministers resident ===
- 1941–1943: Daniel Brickell

=== Envoys extraordinary and ministers plenipotentiary ===
- 1943–1944: Daniel Brickell
- 1944–1945: Nigel Steward
- 1945–1949: John Fell
- 1949–1952: Sir Ian Henderson

=== Ambassadors extraordinary and plenipotentiary ===
- 1952–1953: Sir Ian Henderson
- 1953–1957: Joseph Robinson
- 1957–1959: John Wall
- 1959–1962: Horace Gates
- 1962–1968: Sir Leonard Scopes
- 1968–1972: Brian MacDermot
- 1972–1975: Henry Bartlett
- 1976–1979: Charles Wallace
- 1979–1984: Derrick Mellor
- 1984–1986: Bernard Coleman
- 1986–1989: John MacDonald
- 1989–1991: Terence Steggle
- 1991–1995: Michael Dibben
- 1995–1998: Graham Pirnie
- 1998–2001: Andrew George
- 2001–2005: Anthony Cantor
- 2005–2008: John Hughes (non-resident)
- 2008–2012: Shan Morgan (non-resident)
- 2012–2013: John Freeman (non-resident)
- 2013–2017: Jeremy Hobbs
- 2017–2020: Matthew Hedges
- 2020–2024: Ramin Navai
- 2025–present: Danielle Dunne
