= Margaret Bryan (diplomat) =

British diplomat (born 1929)

United Kingdom Ambassador to Panama
- In office 1986–1989
- Monarch: Elizabeth II
- Prime Minister: Margaret Thatcher
- Preceded by: Terence Steggle
- Succeeded by: John MacDonald

Personal details
- Born: Margaret Grant; 26 September 1929 (age 96)
- Occupation: Diplomat

Margaret Bryan CMG (born 26 September 1929) is a British retired diplomat. She served as Ambassador to Panama from 1986 until 1989. Bryan had been appointed Consul at Kinshasa on 31 March 1980.

== Personal life ==
Bryan is the daughter of James Grant and Dorothy Rebecca Galloway. She married Peter Bernard Bryan in 1952. Their marriage was dissolved in 1981.
