= Francis Pakenham (diplomat) =

British diplomat

Sir Francis Pakenham KCMG (29 February 1832 – 26 January 1905) was a British diplomat who was envoy to Chile, Argentina and Sweden.

== Career ==
The Honourable Francis John Pakenham was the seventh son of Thomas Pakenham, 2nd Earl of Longford. He was educated privately and at Christ Church, Oxford. He joined the Diplomatic Service in 1852 and served at Buenos Aires, Rio de Janeiro, Stockholm, Brussels, Washington, D.C. and Copenhagen before being appointed Minister Resident at Santiago, Chile, 1878–1885, Envoy Extraordinary and Minister Plenipotentiary to Argentina and non-resident minister to Paraguay 1885–1896, and Minister to Sweden and Norway 1896–1902. During this last posting he was knighted KCMG in the New Year Honours of 1898.

Diplomatic posts
Preceded by Sir Horace Rumbold	Minister Resident and Consul-General to the Republic of Chile; 1878–1885	Succeeded by Hugh Fraser
Preceded by Sir Horace Rumbold	Envoy Extraordinary and Minister Plenipotentiary to the Argentine Republic, and Minister Plenipotentiary to the Republic of Paraguay; 1885–1896	Succeeded by Sir William Barrington
Preceded by Sir Horace Rumbold	Envoy Extraordinary and Minister Plenipotentiary to His Majesty the King of Sweden and Norway; 1896–1902	Succeeded by Sir William Barrington

== Sources ==
- This article incorporates text from a publication now in the public domain: Lee, Sidney, ed. (1912). "Pakenham, Francis John". Dictionary of National Biography (2nd supplement). London: Smith, Elder & Co.
- PAKENHAM, Hon. Sir Francis John , Who Was Who, A & C Black, 1920–2008; online edn, Oxford University Press, Dec 2012
- Obituary – Sir Francis Pakenham,The Times, London, 28 January 1905, page 9
