= Look Ahead =

Look Ahead is a charitable housing association based in East London which was established in 1973.

It was involved in the Rough Sleepers Initiative in the 1990s and originally ran a number of large hostels. The last big hostel closed in 2012 and it now provides smaller more specialist services. In 2017 it had more than 1000 staff and was supporting more than 6500 people with mental health problems, learning disabilities, homelessness and young care leavers.

It runs the Tabard Forensic Service, in Tower Hamlets, in partnership with East London NHS Foundation Trust and the London Borough of Tower Hamlets, which provides residential step down support for secure forensic patients. Look Ahead invested £500,000 to refurbish and adapt its building for the project. Established in 2015, it provides a two-year package of care in conjunction with psychiatric services, the local police and community agencies. A study by the Housing Associations' Charitable Trust published in 2018 found this to be £2,972 cheaper per person, per week than the average cost of medium secure mental healthcare, and in the first two years saved health and social care commissioners in the borough £750,000.
