= Eric Arthur Cleugh =

- Born: Eric Arthur Cleugh; 1894
- Died: 1964 (aged 69–70)
- School: Dulwich College

Rugby union career
- Position: tbc
International career
Years	Team	Apps	(Points)
1922	Uruguay	1	(Pts:0)

Eric Arthur Cleugh, CMG, CVO, OBE (/klʌf/; 1894–1964) was a British diplomat who retired as British Ambassador to Panama. Earlier in his life, he had played for Uruguay in a rugby union international against Argentina, although the game was not one for which test caps were awarded.

== Early life ==
Eric's was from a middle-class family from Northumberland. They had three children, Dorothy, James and Eric Arthur. Eric completed his education at Dulwich College, and immediately joined the Consular Service.

== Career ==
Eric's career immediately took him across the Atlantic. He was to go to South, Central and North America. Amongst his postings were stints in Buenos Aires, Mexico City, Washington, D.C., Los Angeles and Havana. His work brought him into contact with Sir Winston Churchill and Lord Halifax and he reportedly became friends with Ernest Hemingway whilst in Cuba. During the Second World War, he was stationed in Los Angeles. He retired in 1955 as British Ambassador to Panama.

== Rugby union ==
Eric Arthur had learnt rugby at Dulwich College, a school that already had a proud history in the sport. In 1922, the school magazine, The Alleynian, reported that a "Rugby International match [had been] played at Monte Video (Uruguay) between Argentine and Uruguay". The report went on to detail that the participants included "twenty public school boys", of whom "five were O.A's" (O.A. being an Old Alleynian, the term for a former pupil of Dulwich College). Despite five playing in the international, only four had won their 1st XV colours at Dulwich. The five former pupils named were C.H. Scott (1914–16) for Argentina, and L.P. Bridal (1914–18), Captain J.M. Cat (1909–15), E.A. Cleugh (1907–13), and C.E. Cat (1909–16) for Uruguay. Cleugh's former school mate, C.E. Cat, was at the time the captain of Argentina's premier team, Belgrano Club, but played for Uruguay because he was born in that country. The match took place 26 years before Uruguay's first official match against Chile in 1948.

== Personal life ==
On June 27, 1927, Cleugh married socialite Frances Stevens in Paris. They divorced on June 15, 1935.

He married Maxine Rose-Marie Harding in New York City on February 11, 1938. They had two daughters, Victoria Maxine and Nicola Ilona.

Cleugh died in Mallorca, an island he had said he had fallen in love with "from the moment he first saw the rocky coastline from the deck of the Barcelona ferry."

== Bibliography ==
Eric Cleugh published a number of books about his life and work. In 1960 he published his autobiography "Without Let or Hindrance" and his second book was titled "Viva Mallorca" was published in 1963, a very personal view of his perceptions of life in Mallorca.

- Without Let or Hindrance. Reminiscences of a British Foreign Service officer, Publisher: Cassell (1960), ASIN: B000WTYLAY
- Viva Mallorca. Yesterday and today in the Balearic Islands., ASIN: B000WTUPQS
- Panama. Economic and commercial conditions in the Republic of Panama and the Canal Zone. With a map (Overseas Economic Surveys.), ASIN: B000WU0K3A

Diplomatic posts
Preceded by John Dee Greenway	Ambassador from the United Kingdom to Panama; 1950 – 1955	Succeeded by Ian Leslie Henderson
