= Alan Meredith Williams =

British diplomat

Sir Alan Meredith Williams KCMG (22 August 1909 – 2 December 1972) was a British diplomat who was ambassador to Panama and Spain.

== Career ==
Williams was educated at Berkhamsted School and Pembroke College, Cambridge. He entered Her Majesty's Consular Service in 1932 and served successively at San Francisco, USA; Panama; Paris, France; Hamburg, Germany; Rotterdam, the Netherlands; Reykjavík, Iceland; Leopoldville; Vienna, Austria; 1945–1946, where he was a member of the Allied Control Commission as well; Baghdad, Iraq; New York, USA, (as deputy consul-general from 1950 to 1953); Tunis; the Foreign Office (as an Inspector of Foreign Office Establishments) from 1956 to 1960; and as Consul-General at New York 1960–64. He was Ambassador to Panama 1964–66 and to Spain 1966–69.

In 1946 Williams married Miss Masha Poustchine, an Englishwoman descendant from a Russian family; they had a son, Lawrence, and a daughter, Elizabeth.

Williams was appointed CMG in 1958 and knighted KCMG in 1963.
