= Gerald Carroll =

British businessman (born 1951)

- Born: Gerald John Howard Carroll; 1951 (age 74–75); Essex
- Education: Ipswich School
- Occupation: Businessman
- Known for: Carroll Group

Gerald John Howard Carroll (born 1951) is a British businessman. He was the head of his family business the Carroll Group, once one of the largest private companies in the United Kingdom, until it collapsed in the early 1990s, leading to his bankruptcy.

== Early life and family ==
Gerald Carroll was born in 1951 in the Romford district of Essex. He is the son of John Carroll (born around 1929). His grandfather was John E. Carroll who built homes for workers at the Ford factory in Dagenham. Carroll claims descent from the Anglo-Irish Carroll family who have been prominent in American politics and one of whom was the sole Catholic signatory to the American Declaration of Independence. Carroll was educated at the independent Ipswich School.

== Career ==
Carroll took control of the family business in the late 1970s but claimed in an interview with Sky News to be self-made. He launched a bid for quoted car dealership Frank G. Gates in 1985 but specialised in spotting property development sites and obtaining planning permission for them.

In 1995, Carroll was made bankrupt after the failure of the Carroll Group.

== Philanthropy ==
In 1990, Carroll agreed to endow a chair of Irish history for £1.5m at Hertford College, University of Oxford. His bankruptcy however prevented him from supplying all of the agreed funding.

== See also ==
- Leap Castle
- O'Carroll
