= Francis Richard Plunkett =

Anglo-Irish diplomat

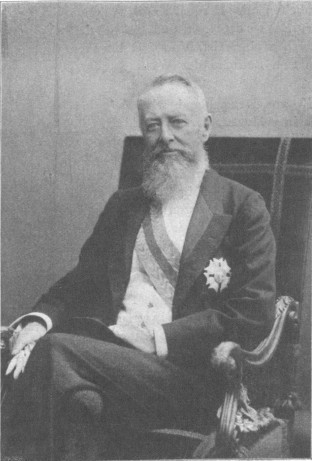
Francis Richard Plunkett, 1900

Sir Francis Richard Plunkett GCB GCMG GCVO PC (3 February 1835 – 28 February 1907) was an Anglo-Irish diplomat.

== Early life ==
Plunkett was born at Corbalton Hall in County Meath, Ireland. He was the youngest son of Arthur Plunkett, 9th Earl of Fingall and Louisa Emilia Corbally, daughter of Elias Corbally of Corbalton. He was educated at St Mary's College, Oscott.

== Family ==
He married Mary Tevis Morgan, daughter of Charles Wain Morgan of Philadelphia and his wife Heloise Tevis, in 1870. She died in 1924. They had two daughters, Norah and Helen. Norah married the Swedish diplomat Count August Gyldenstolpe, Swedish Envoy to France 1905–1918. Helen never married.

== Career ==
Plunkett entered the diplomatic service in 1855. In 1873, he was nominated as Secretary of Legation in Tokyo under Sir Harry Parkes. He left Tokyo in 1876 and served as Diplomatic Secretary in St Petersburg, Constantinople and Paris before being appointed Parkes's successor in Japan. He was noted for kindness and affability, which made him a great success in each of his diplomatic missions.

Plunkett was the British Minister in Tokyo, 1884–87, He was made a Knight Commander of the Order of St Michael and St George while in Tokyo.

In 1900 he was appointed Ambassador at Vienna. The following year he was appointed to the Privy Council in February 1901, and was created a Knight Grand Cross of the Order of the Bath (GCB) on 9 November 1901.

He retired in 1905 and died of heart failure in Paris in 1907, after suffering from a bout of influenza.

== See also ==
- List of Ambassadors from the United Kingdom to Japan
- Anglo-Japanese relations
