= Edward Thornton =

Edward Thornton may refer to:

- Edward Thornton, 1st Count of Cacilhas (1766–1852), British privy counsellor
- Sir Edward Thornton, 2nd Count of Cacilhas (1817–1906), British ambassador to Russia and Constantinople
- Eddie Thornton (1931–2025), Jamaican trumpeter
- Edward Parry Thornton (1811–1893), British administrator in India
- Edward Thornton (politician), Canadian politician
- Edward Thornton (cricketer) (1893–1970), English cricketer and military officer
