= Michael Simpson-Orlebar =

British diplomat (1932–2000)

Sir Michael Simpson-Orlebar KCMG

British Ambassador to Mexico
- In office 1989–1992
- Preceded by: Sir John Morgan
- Succeeded by: Sir Roger Hervey

British Ambassador to Portugal
- In office 1986–1989
- Preceded by: Sir Hugh Campbell Byatt
- Succeeded by: Hugh James Arbuthnott

Personal details
- Born: 5 February 1932
- Died: 2 January 2000 (aged 67)
- Children: 3
- Education: Christ Church, Oxford
- Occupation: Diplomat

Sir Michael (Keith Orlebar) Simpson-Orlebar (5 February 1932 – 2 January 2000) was a British diplomat. He served as British Ambassador to Portugal from 1986 to 1989 and British Ambassador to Mexico from 1989 to 1992.

== Early life and education ==
Simpson-Orlebar was born on 5 February 1932, the son of Aubrey Orlebar Simpson and Laura née Keith-Jones. He was educated at Eton College and Christ Church, Oxford where he took his MA in History.

== Career ==
After performing his National Service as 2nd Lieutenant in the King’s Royal Rifle Corps from 1950 to 1951, Simpson-Orlebar entered the Foreign Service in 1954, and was sent to Tehran as second secretary, a post he held from 1955 to 1957. He was then at the Foreign Office for five years, including two years as private secretary to a junior minister, the Parliamentary Under-Secretary of State. From 1962 to 1965, he was first secretary, commercial, and consul at Bogota.

After two years back at the Foreign Office, Simpson-Orlebar was then first secretary in Paris from 1969 to 1972 working with the ambassador on the negotiations for Britain's entry into the Common Market, and then counsellor, commercial, in Tehran from 1972 to 1976. Benefiting from the rise in the price of oil, according to The Times, "The Shah was determined to use his wealth to turn Iran into a developed, industrialised, heavily armed regional power. Simpson-Orlebar found himself close to the centre of major commercial negotiations, each tougher and rougher than the one that went before". After serving from 1977 to 1980 as head of the United Nations Department at the Foreign and Commonwealth Office, he was minister at the British Embassy in Rome from 1980 to 1983, and then returned to Tehran as head of the British Interests Section which was part of the Swedish Embassy, the Shah having been deposed and the Ayatollahs having broken off diplomatic relations with the UK. He served in the post from 1983 to 1985, and strove hard to save what British interests remained during what were described as "tumultuous years".

Simpson-Orlebar then served as Ambassador to Portugal from 1986 to 1989, and Ambassador to Mexico from 1989 to 1992.

== Personal life and death ==
Simpson-Orlebar married Rosita Duarte Triana in 1964 whom he had met while posted to Bogata, and they had two sons a daughter. After his retirement from the Diplomatic Service in 1992, he became director-general of the Canning House organisation and the Hispanic and Luso Brazilian Council, serving from 1992 to 1996, and chairman of the British-Mexican Society from 1992 to 1995.

Simpson-Orlebar died on 2 January 2000, aged 67.

== Honours ==
Simpson-Orlebar was appointed Companion of the Order of St Michael and St George (CMG) in the 1982 Birthday Honours, and promoted to Knight Commander (KCMG) in the 1991 Birthday Honours. In 1994 Mexico awarded him the Order of the Aztec Eagle.

== See also ==
- Iran–United Kingdom relations
- Portugal–United Kingdom relations
- Mexico–United Kingdom relations

Diplomatic posts
Preceded by Sir Hugh Campbell Byatt	British Ambassador to Portugal; 1986–1989	Succeeded by Hugh James Arbuthnott
Preceded by Sir John Morgan	British Ambassador to Mexico; 1989–1992	Succeeded by Sir Roger Hervey
