= Newton Valence =

Village and parish in Hampshire, England

Coordinates: 51.08897°N 0.96848°W

- Location within Hampshire
- Population: 226 (2011 Census)
- OS grid reference: SU723326
- Civil parish: Newton Valence
- District: East Hampshire
- Shire county: Hampshire
- Region: South East
- Country: England
- Sovereign state: United Kingdom
- Post town: Alton
- Postcode district: GU34
- Police: Hampshire and Isle of Wight
- Fire: Hampshire and Isle of Wight
- Ambulance: South Central
- UK Parliament: East Hampshire

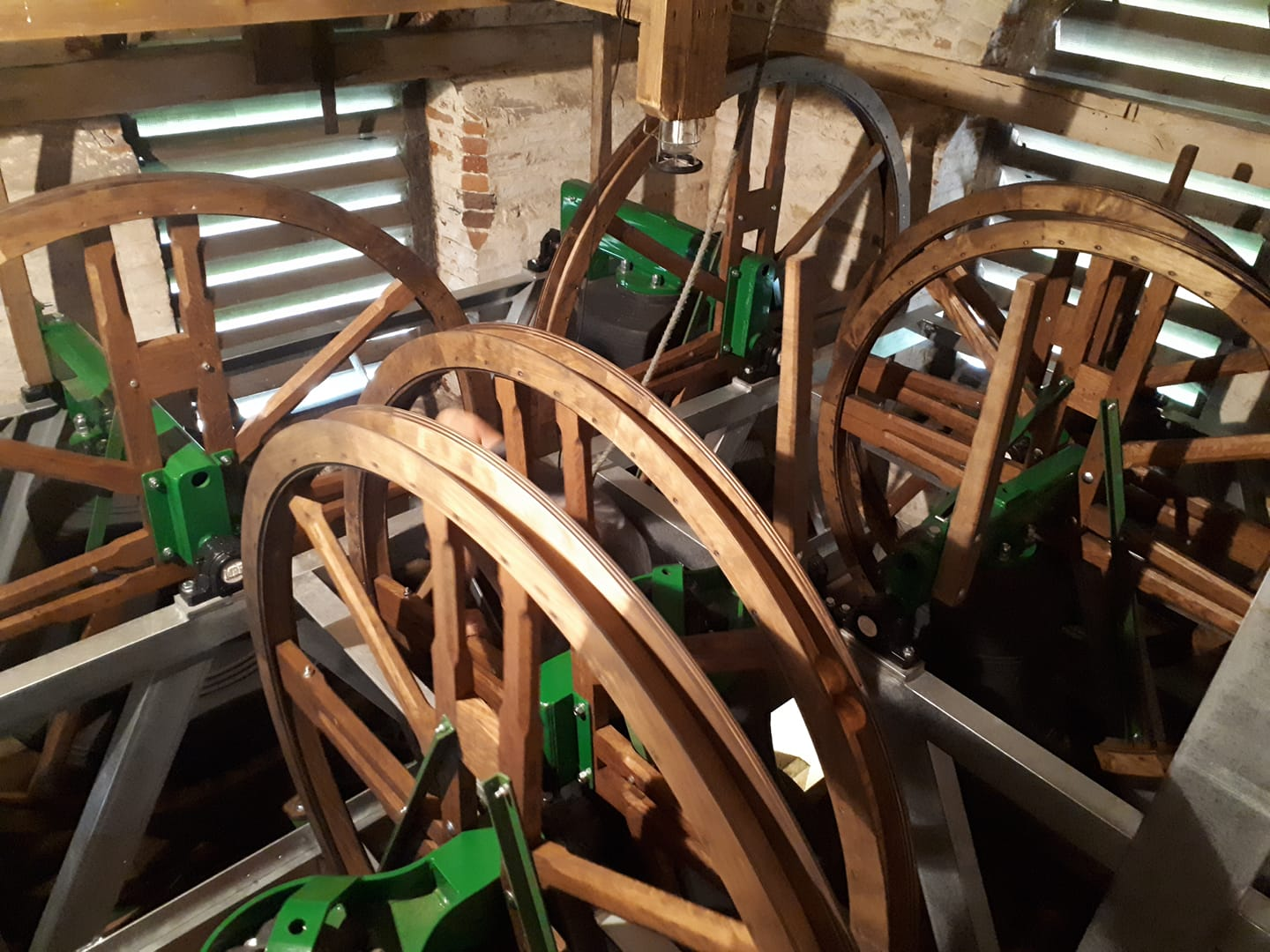
The newly-restored ring of six bells in the tower of St Mary's Church.

Newton Valence is a village and civil parish in the East Hampshire district of Hampshire, England. It is 4.4 miles (7.1 km) south of Alton, just off the A32 road.

The nearest railway station is Liss, 4.5 miles (7.3 km) southeast of the village, although the station at Alton is a similar distance to the north.

The village sits high in the westernmost chalk hills of the South Downs: maximum elevation 191 metres (627 feet) above sea level. Much of the surrounding landscape is within the East Hampshire Area of Outstanding Natural Beauty.

Farming is the most obvious economic activity. Arable farming (mainly wheat, maize and oil-seed rape) and sheep-grazing predominate.

== The church and grounds ==
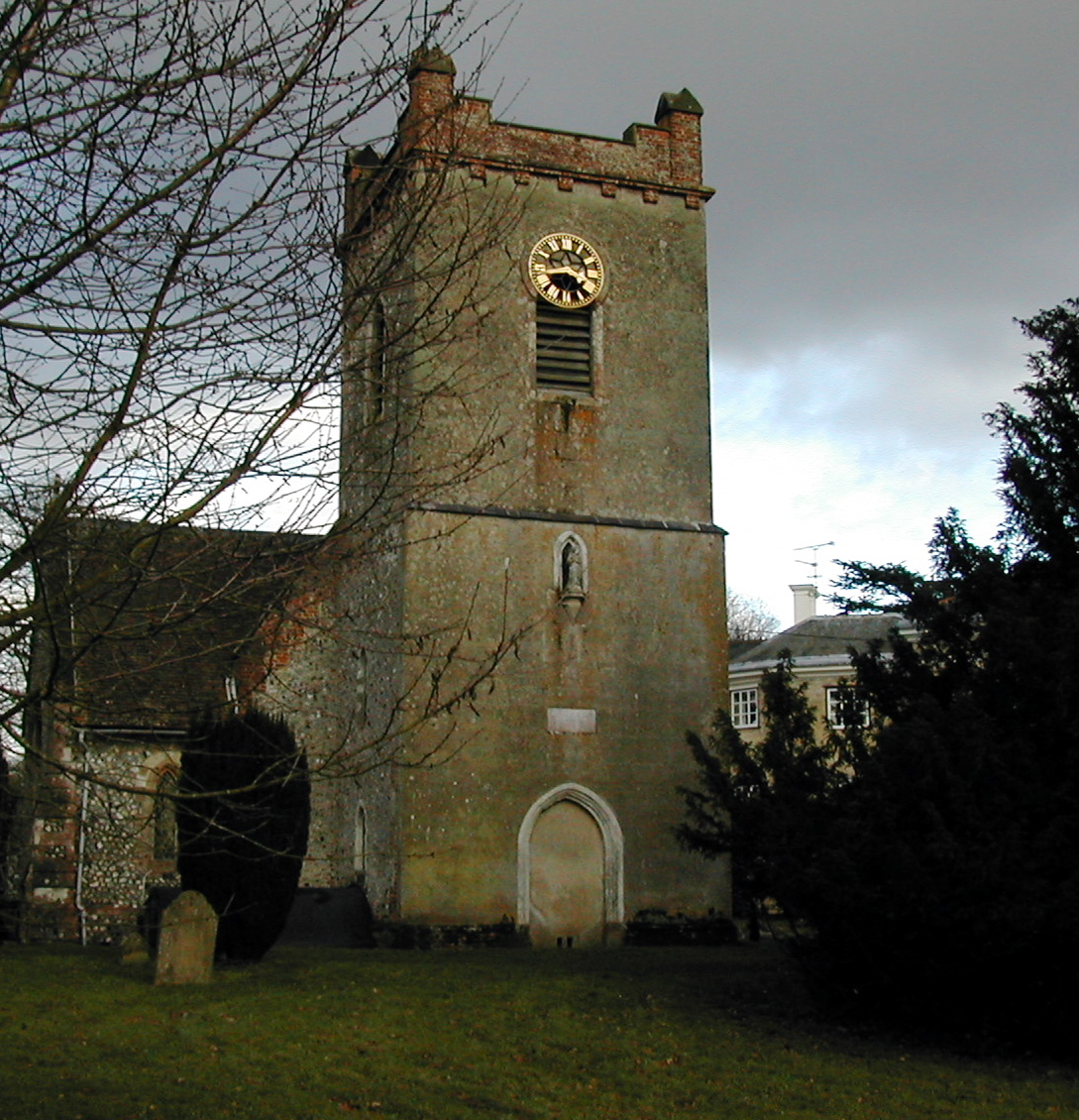
St Mary's. The yew tree is on the right.

The Anglican church of St Mary's was restored in 1871 and is faced in flint. The nave and chancel are early English, about 1300; the west tower is also early English, but has an embattled top, made of brick and dated to 1812.

There are a total of seven bells in the tower, the largest weighing nine hundredweight (approximately 498 kilogrammes). The original five bells were removed from the tower in 2021, as part of a project to restore the frame and fittings, and to retune the poor toned bells. The four largest bells were retuned and rehung for traditional Change ringing, and were augmented to six with the addition of two 'second-hand' bells, one relocated from the derelict church of St Elisabeth in Eastbourne, and the other from Holm Cultram Abbey. The original treble bell is retained in the tower, although retired from full-circle Change ringing, and is now hung for static chiming. The restoration project was completed in the summer of 2022, and the bells first rang out in celebration of the Platinum Jubilee of Elizabeth II.

The tower's black-faced clock was restored as a Millennium Project. There are two piscinas and a large Norman font. One of the Piscinas is found in the sanctuary, it is Norman and believed to have come from an earlier church on this site. The second is a "neat" 13th Century Piscina and is in the side chapel.

Charles Wilson, 1st Baron Moran, Sir Winston Churchill's personal physician, is buried in the churchyard.

The yew tree next to the church is one of the most venerable in the district now that the famous yew at Selborne Church has died. Its age has been estimated at 1,000 years.

Adjoining the churchyard is the Manor House (17th–18th Century), now divided into two dwellings. The older portion has two storeys of coursed stone blocks with brick dressings, plinth and band, and a long ridge slate roof. There is a red brick Georgian portion, with parapet and hipped tile roof. The Victorian wing, of yellow brick, is of two storeys with a low pitched slate roof and sash windows.

Opposite the driveway to the church is a dew pond which was repuddled in the 1990s. Nearby, on a triangle of grass between Newton Lane and the track to Selborne Common, is a small sarsen stone.

== Amenities ==
The village has a Sports and Social Centre (half of the Victorian school; the other half has been converted to a dwelling), but no shops or public house.

== Prehistoric settlement ==
Known traces of prehistoric settlement are:

1. A Bronze Age bowl barrow: 36 metres in diameter and 1.8 metres high (north-east of Lodge Farm; damaged by ploughing)
2. An Iron Age field system: at the southern edge of Goldridge Plantation, comprising a series of three contour lynchets extending for nearly 1.6 km.

== Enclosure ==
The enclosure of the commons and common fields of Newton Valence was authorised in 1848 in the Second Enclosure Act of that year along with fifteen other disparate places, with only Greatham also in Hampshire. It was further evidence of a government and landowners’ conveyor belt. The enclosure business was now such that a local professional land surveyor and valuer was employed. Richard Wakefield Attree of Bishearne in the parish of Liss produced a rapid, but competent, report allotting almost 150 acres among nine groups consisting of eleven people with a further six acres specified for roads and a pond. The connected Upper and Lower Commons were the centre of interest running half-way down what is now Mary Lane, including Common Barn Farm, and was then called Common Road. Three public carriage roads, twenty-six feet wide, were directed and laid out on the maps. The pond was to be a ‘public watering place’ at Upper Common on the Ropley and East Tisted border and marking a continuum of old commons all the way to Soldridge. The pond can be seen today at Headmore Farm on Headmore Lane in what was the furthest point in Newton Valence from the village centre. ‘Cleansing and repairs’ were allocated to Henry Chawner, the largest land recipient and lord of the manor by purchase.

Chawner was one of five who received over 10 per cent of the Newton Valence commons, 53 acres, 27.7 per cent, in three lots, to add to his existing 517 acres. The others were Robert and Henry Knight, 21.6 per cent in three lots; Eli Turvill, 13.9 per cent; James Winter Scott, 11.4 per cent and Captain George Ourry Lempriere, 10.3 per cent. A further two fenced acres were allotted to the churchwardens and overseers of the poor in trust ‘as a place of exercise and recreation for the inhabitants … of the neighbourhood’. Attree's two detailed maps survive.

== Notable residents ==
- Thomas Dumaresq (d. 1802), British Admiral
- Henry Chawner (d. 1851), freeman of the Goldsmiths’ Company of London
- Anthony Norris Groves (d. 1853), British missionary
- George Ourry Lempriere (d. 1864), British Admiral
- Audley Lempriere (d. 1855), British Army officer, son of George Lempriere
- Rev. Thomas Snow (d. 1885), fourth son of banker George Snow and a leading member of a small group of Anglican discontents known collectively as the Western Schism, led by Sir Thomas Baring
- Sir Thomas Snow (d. 1940), British Army officer
- Charles Wilson, 1st Baron Moran (d. 1978), physician and personal doctor to Winston Churchill - died at the home of his son in Newton Valence
- Julian Balaam, Aeronautical engineer

== Other information ==
The village features in Gilbert White's Natural History of Selborne. White's brother, John, used to live in Newton Valence. Gilbert would cross Selborne Common to visit him: a walk of about two miles, made easier in 1753 when they finished construction of the Zig-Zag path which, ascending from Selborne to the Common, is still in use today.

Within the parish boundary is Noar Hill, part of which is given over to a nature reserve noted for its flowers and butterflies.
