= 1985 Special Honours =

British government recognitions

As part of the British honours system, Special Honours are issued at the Monarch's pleasure at any given time. The Special Honours refer to the awards made within royal prerogative, operational honours and other honours awarded outside the New Years Honours and Birthday Honours

== Life peer ==
=== Baronesses ===
- Miss Gloria Hooper, Member, European Parliament.
- Muriel Winifred, Mrs Turner, Assistant General Secretary of the Association of Scientific, Technical and Managerial Staffs.

=== Barons ===
- John Blackstock Butterworth, CBE, DL, Vice-Chancellor, University of Warwick.
- Lieutenant-Colonel Richard Crawshaw, OBE, TD, DL, Barrister-at-Law and former Social Democratic Party Member of Parliament.
- Bernard Donoughue, Head of Research and Investment Policy, Gneveson Grant and Company.
- Sir Robert William Elliott, former Conservative Member of Parliament.
- Sir Marcus Richard Kimball, former Conservative Member of Parliament.
- Hugh Drennan Baird Morton, QC, Member of Criminal Injuries Compensation Board.
- Sir Charles Russell Sanderson, Chairman, Yorkshire and Lancashire Investment Trust.
- The Right Honourable Samuel Charles Silkin, QC Deputy Chairman, British Printing and Communications Corporation plc.
- Charles Cuthbert Powell Williams, CBE, former Chairman, Henry Ansbacher Holdings and Company Limited.
- Sir Leonard Gordon Wolfson, Chairman, Great Universal Stores Merchandise Corporation.

== Royal Victorian Order ==
=== Knight Commander (KCVO) ===
- Hugh Campbell Byatt, C.M.G.

=== Commander (CVO) ===
- Anthony David Brighty, C.M.G.

=== Lieutenant (LVO) ===
- Paul Webster Hare
- Commander David Peter Mears, Royal Navy

=== Member (MVO) ===
- Leslie David Clegg

=== Royal Victorian Medal (Silver) (RVM) ===
- John Ernest Morton
