= Baron Moran =

Barony in the Peerage of the United Kingdom

Baron Moran, of Manton in the County of Wiltshire, is a title in the peerage of the United Kingdom. It was created on 8 March 1943 for the physician Charles Wilson (10 November 1882 – 12 April 1977). He is chiefly remembered as Winston Churchill's personal physician during the Second World War and was president of the Royal College of Physicians from 1941 to 1949. His diary of his association with Churchill—that continued to Winston's death in 1965—was published in 1966.

He was succeeded in 1977 by his eldest son, the second baron, a diplomat who notably served as British Ambassador to Hungary and Portugal and as British High Commissioner to Canada from 1981 to 1984. He was one of the 90 hereditary peers elected to remain in the House of Lords after the passing of the House of Lords Act 1999, where he sat as a crossbencher.

In 2014 the title passed to the latter's son, James McMoran Wilson, the 3rd Baron Moran.

== Barons Moran (1943–) ==
- Charles McMoran Wilson, 1st Baron Moran (1882–1977)
- (Richard) John McMoran Wilson, 2nd Baron Moran (1924–2014)
- James McMoran Wilson, 3rd Baron Moran (b. 1952)

The heir apparent is the present holder's son, Hon. David Andrew McMoran Wilson (b. 1990).
