= Audley Lempriere =

Captain Audley Lempriere
- Born: 1834; Newton Valence
- Died: 19 April 1855 (aged 20–21)
- Allegiance: United Kingdom of Great Britain and Ireland
- Branch: British Army
- Service years: 1853–1855
- Rank: Captain
- Conflicts: Crimean War: Battle of the Alma; Battle of Inkerman; Siege of Sevastopol (1854–1855)

Captain Audley Lempriere (1834–1855) was an officer in the British Army in the 77th (East Middlesex) Regiment of Foot during the Crimean war who was killed 19 April 1855, outside of Sebastopol during an attack on a Russian rifle pit. He was most notable for his young age and small size, being the smallest officer in the British Army, standing less than 5 feet, he earned the nickname "The Boy Captain".

== Life ==
Audley Lempriere was the son of Admiral George O. Lempriere and Frances Dumaresq of Pelham Place. His Great-Grandfather was Admiral Thomas Dumaresq through his mother's side.

== Career ==
Lempriere graduated from the Royal Military College, in 1853 where he would be given a commission to Ensign without purchase into the 77th Regiment. In 1853, the Crimean War also broke out and Lempriere along with the 77th Regiment would head to the Crimean Peninsula in 1854. Lempriere would fight with distinction in the Battle of Alma and the Battle of Inkerman. Lempriere was held in good regard by his command for being dependable and was respected by most of his peers despite his size and age. Eventually he would be promoted Captain and command a company.

== Death ==
Shortly after getting his company, Lempriere would be killed on 19 April 1855 while gallantly charging a Russian rifle pit at the Siege of Sevastopol. His death would greatly affect his commanding officer, Colonel Thomas Graham Egerton, who took Lempriere's body off the battlefield while declaring "they shall never take my child". Colonel Egerton would return to lead a second attack on the Russian rifle pits, where they would be captured but Colonel Egerton would die in process. The rifle pit was known from then on as "Egerton's Pit". Captain Lempriere and Colonel Egerton would be buried beside each other in a ceremony attended by Field-Marshal Lord Raglan and Lieutenant-General Sir George Brown.

== Legacy ==
The Ballad of the Boy Captain highlights the life and death of Captain Lempriere during the Crimean War.

Captain Lempriere and his sister are referenced repeatedly in the book Military Men of Feeling: Emotion, Touch, and Masculinity in the Crimean War by Dr. Holly Furneaux.

Captain Audley Lemprière's coatee that he was wearing when he died is on display in the National Army Museum.
