= List of ambassadors of the United Kingdom to Portugal =

The ambassador of the United Kingdom to Portugal is the United Kingdom's foremost diplomatic representative in the Portuguese Republic, and head of the UK's diplomatic mission in Portugal.

For ambassadors from the Court of St James's to Portugal before 1707, see List of ambassadors of the Kingdom of England to Portugal. For ambassadors from 1707 to 1800, see List of ambassadors of Great Britain to Portugal.

== List of heads of mission ==
=== Envoys of the United Kingdom to Portugal ===
- 1800–1802: John Hookham Frere Envoy Extraordinary and Minister Plenipotentiary at the Court of His Highness the Prince Regent of Portugal
- 1802–1806: Lord Robert FitzGerald Envoy Extraordinary and Minister Plenipotentiary to the Court of Lisbon
- 1806: Lord Rosslyn and Lord St Vincent, extraordinary envoys
- 1806: Viscount Strangford chargé d'affaires

=== Envoys extraordinary and ministers plenipotentiary ===
- 1807–1808: Viscount Strangford
- 1808–1810: John Charles Villiers
- 1810–1814: Sir Charles Stuart
- 1814–1817: Thomas Sydenham
- 1817–1820: Sir Edward Thornton
- 1820–1823: Edward Michael Ward (chargé d'affaires)
- 1823–1824: Sir Edward Thornton

=== Ambassadors extraordinary and plenipotentiary ===
- 1824–1827: Sir William à Court
- 1827–1828: Sir Frederick Lamb
- 1828–1833: Diplomatic relations severed after accession of King Miguel

=== Envoys extraordinary and ministers plenipotentiary ===
- 1833–1846: Lord Howard de Walden
- 1846–1851: Sir George Seymour
- 1851–1855: Sir Richard Pakenham
- 1855–1859: Henry Howard
- 1859–1866: Sir Arthur Magenis
- 1866–1867: Sir Augustus Paget
- September–December 1867: Edward Thornton
- 1867–1874: Sir Charles Murray
- 1874–1876: Robert Bulwer-Lytton
- 1876–1881: Robert Morier
- 1881–1884: Sir Charles Wyke
- 1884–1892: George Petre
- 1893–1902: Sir Hugh MacDonell
- 1902–1905: Sir Martin Gosselin
- 1905–1911: Sir Francis Villiers
- 1911–1913: Sir Arthur Hardinge
- 1913–1924: Sir Lancelot Carnegie

=== Ambassadors extraordinary and plenipotentiary ===
- 1924–1928: Sir Lancelot Carnegie
- 1928–1929: Sir Colville Barclay
- 1929–1931: Sir Francis Lindley
- 1931–1935: Sir Claud Russell
- 1935–1937: Sir Charles Wingfield
- 1937–1940: Sir Walford Selby
- 1940–1945: Sir Ronald Campbell
- 1945–1947: Sir Owen St.Clair O'Malley
- 1947–1955: Sir Nigel Ronald
- 1955–1961: Sir Charles Stirling
- 1961–1966: Sir Archibald Ross
- 1966–1970: Sir Anthony Lambert
- 1970–1974: Sir David Muirhead
- 1974–1976: Sir Nigel Trench
- 1976–1981: Sir John Moran (Lord Moran from 1977)
- 1981–1986: Sir Hugh Campbell Byatt (son of Sir Horace Archer Byatt)
- 1986–1989: Sir Michael Simpson-Orlebar
- 1989–1993: Hugh James Arbuthnott
- 1993–1995: Sir Stephen Wall
- 1995–1999: Roger Westbrook
- 1999–2001: Sir John Holmes
- 2001–2004: Dame Glynne Evans
- 2004–2007: John Buck
- 2007–2011: Alexander Ellis
- 2011–2014: Jill Gallard
- 2014–2018: Kirsty Hayes
- 2018–2024: Chris Sainty
- 2024–present: Lisa Bandari
