= John Wilson, 2nd Baron Moran =

British diplomat (1924–2014)

The Right Honourable The Lord Moran KCMG
- Moran in 2009

Member of the House of Lords
- Lord Temporal
- Hereditary peerage 5 September 1977 – 11 November 1999
- Preceded by: The 1st Baron Moran
- Succeeded by: Seat abolished
- Elected Hereditary Peer; 11 November 1999 – 14 February 2014
- Election: 1999
- Preceded by: Seat established
- Succeeded by: The 7th Baron Cromwell

British Ambassador to Hungary
- In office 1973–1976
- Monarch: Elizabeth II
- President: János Kádár
- Preceded by: Derek Dodson
- Succeeded by: Sir Richard Parsons

British Ambassador to Portugal
- In office 1976–1981
- Monarch: Elizabeth II
- President: António Ramalho Eanes
- Preceded by: Sir Nigel Trench
- Succeeded by: Sir Hugh Campbell Byatt

Personal details
- Born: 22 September 1924
- Died: 14 February 2014 (aged 89)
- Education: Eton College
- Alma mater: King's College, Cambridge

Richard John McMoran Wilson, 2nd Baron Moran, KCMG (22 September 1924 – 14 February 2014), known as John Wilson, was a British diplomat. He was one of the ninety hereditary peers elected to remain in the House of Lords after the passing of the House of Lords Act 1999.

== Background and early life ==
The son of the 1st Baron Moran and Dorothy (née Dufton), he was educated at Eton College in Berkshire and King's College, Cambridge, where he received a Bachelor of Arts in history. Wilson served in the Royal Naval Reserve from 1943 to 1945. He was first Ordinary Seaman on HMS Belfast, later Sub-Lieutenant on Motor Torpedo Boats (MTB 684) and Destroyer HMS Oribi.

== Diplomatic career ==
In 1945, Wilson entered the Foreign and Commonwealth Office and held various minor offices in Ankara, Tel Aviv, Rio de Janeiro, Washington, D.C. and South Africa. From 1968 to 1973, he was Head of the West African Department of the Foreign Office, and from 1970 to 1973 concurrently non-resident British Ambassador to Chad. Wilson was British Ambassador to Hungary between 1973 and 1976 and British Ambassador to Portugal from 1976 to 1981.

In 1981, he was appointed High Commissioner to Canada and held this post until 1984. On leaving his post of High Commissioner to Canada in 1984, Moran penned a frank final telegram to the British Foreign Secretary in which he was highly critical of Canadian politicians, public policies and ordinary Canadians. The telegram became public in October 2009 after a BBC columnist, Matthew Parris, made a freedom of information request for the foreign office's valedictory despatches.

== Other public appointments ==
From 1990 to 1995, Wilson was chair of the Wildlife and Countryside Link, from 1988 to 1995 vice-chairman of the Atlantic Salmon Trust, and from 1989 to 1994 served as chairman of the National Rivers Authority Regional Fisheries Advisory Committee for the Welsh Region. For RSPB, he was council member from 1992 to 1994, and vice-president from 1996 to 1997. He was president of the Radnorshire Wildlife Trust (1994-death) and Chair of the Fisheries Policy and Legislation Working Group ("the Moran Committee"; from 1997 until his death). In 1997 he was appointed chair of the Salmon and Trout Association, remaining until 2000, when he became executive vice-president. Having been president of the Welsh Salmon and Trout Angling Association from 1988 to 1995, he was renamed as president in 2000.

== Writings ==
In 1973, Wilson wrote a biography about Sir Henry Campbell-Bannerman, for which he received the Whitbread Award for Biography. Having been made a Companion of the Order of St Michael and St George in 1970, he was raised to a Knight Commander in 1981. In 1978, he received also the Grand Cross of the Portuguese Order of Infante D. Henrique.

== Family ==
In 1948 he married Shirley Rowntree Harris; the couple had two sons and a daughter. He died in February 2014 aged 89.

== Works ==
- C.B. – A Life of Sir Henry Campbell-Bannerman (1973)

Diplomatic posts
Preceded by Derek Dodson	British Ambassador to Hungary; 1973–1976	Succeeded by Sir Richard Parsons
Preceded by Sir Nigel Trench	British Ambassador to Portugal; 1976–1981	Succeeded by Sir Hugh Campbell Byatt
Preceded by John Ford	High Commissioner to Canada; 1981–1984	Succeeded by Sir Derek Day
Peerage of the United Kingdom
Preceded by Charles Wilson	Baron Moran; 1977–2014; Member of the House of Lords (1977–1999)	Succeeded by James Wilson
Parliament of the United Kingdom
New office created by the House of Lords Act 1999	Elected hereditary peer to the House of Lords under the House of Lords Act 1999; 1999–2014	Succeeded by The Lord Cromwell
