= Anthony Merry =

British diplomat (1756-1835)

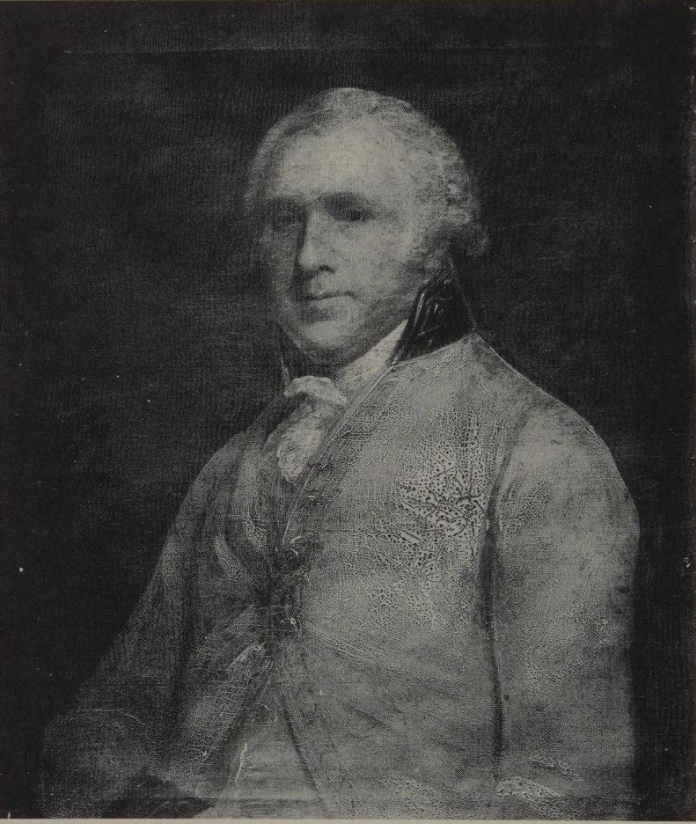
- portrait by Gilbert Stuart, 1805
- Born: 2 August 1756
- Died: 14 June 1835 (aged 78)
- Occupation: Diplomat
- Employer: Foreign Office
- Spouse(s): Elizabeth Merry
- Position held: ambassador of the United Kingdom of Great Britain and Ireland to the United States (1803–1806), ambassador of the United Kingdom to Denmark (1807–1807), ambassador of the United Kingdom to Sweden (1808–1809)

Anthony Merry (2 August 1756 – 14 June 1835) was a British diplomat. He was Britain's representative to the United States in Washington, D.C. from 1803 to 1806, and British Minister to Sweden from 1808 to 1809.

== Biography ==
The son of a London wine merchant, Anthony Merry served in various diplomatic posts in Europe between 1783 and 1803, holding mostly consular positions. In 1803 he married Elizabeth Leathes, widow of John Leathes of Herringfield House, Suffolk. He was Chargé d'Affaires in Madrid in 1796 and again in Copenhagen about 1799, and Minister ad interim in Paris in 1802. Merry was Britain's representative to the United States in Washington, D.C. from 1803 to 1806.

When Merry arrived in the United States, he was received without any hospitality by President Thomas Jefferson, who greeted him in casual clothes and bedroom slippers and was inclined to show hostility towards Britain through Merry. Merry and his wife were invited to dinner at the White House along with the French chargé d'affaires and his wife at a time when the two countries were at war with one another, a notable breach of etiquette. When Merry made a complaint about protocol to James Madison, Madison increased the offence by referring to it as "a matter of very little moment". Jefferson's hostility extended to Mrs. Merry, whom he called a "virago", though Aaron Burr greatly admired her.

From then on Merry found himself disgusted by America. Soon after, Aaron Burr came to Merry seeking help with detaching the Ohio and Mississippi valleys from the Union. Merry reported back to the Foreign Office that Burr was extremely willing and ready to seek revenge against the United States. In April 1805 Merry was again approached by Burr, who claimed that Louisiana was ready to leave the United States. Burr, however, after being dropped from the Presidential ticket, had not the money nor power to seize Louisiana. He, therefore, sought assistance from Britain through Merry. Unfortunately for Merry and Burr, Britain had a new Foreign Secretary, Charles James Fox, who was friendly with America. Fox found the request treasonous, and on 1 June 1806, recalled Merry to Britain. According to Henry Adams, Burr's intention was to exploit the dissatisfaction of the populace of Louisiana with the purchase.

Merry did not expect to be employed again, but in 1807 the new British government sent him to Copenhagen to conciliate the Danes over the bombardment of Copenhagen. Merry was then sent as British Minister to Sweden from 1808, a post from which he retired in 1809. He then lived at Dedham, Essex until his death in 1835.

Diplomatic posts
Preceded by Robert Liston	British Minister to the United States; 1803–1806	Succeeded by David Erskine
Preceded by Edward Thornton	British ambassador to Sweden; 1808--1809	Succeeded by Edward Thornton
