= George Lempriere =

British Royal Navy officer (1787–1864)

Admiral George Lempriere
- Born: 1787; Jersey
- Died: 16 January 1864 (aged 76–77)
- Allegiance: United Kingdom
- Branch: Royal Navy
- Service years: 1797–1846
- Rank: Admiral
- Commands: HMS Ulysses; HMS Redbridge; HMS Trent
- Conflicts: French Revolutionary Wars; Battle of Copenhagen; Napoleonic Wars; Invasion of Guadeloupe; War of 1812

Admiral George Ourry Lempriere (1787 – 16 January 1864) was a Royal Navy officer who served during the French Revolutionary and Napoleonic Wars. He did not serve actively as a flag officer, being promoted on the retired list.

== Early life ==
George Ourry Lempriere was born in 1787 to Colonel Thomas Lempriere, Seigneur of Chesnel, and Elizabeth Beuzeville, of Jersey. His father was wounded at the Battle of Jersey.

== Career ==
Lempriere joined the Royal Navy in 1797, where he served under Lord Nelson at the Battle of Copenhagen in 1801. In 1807, he received his commission as a lieutenant. In 1810 Lempriere served under Sir Alexander Cochrane in the Invasion of Guadeloupe, part of the Napoleonic Wars. In 1811, Lempriere was moved to HMS Africa under the command of Sir Herbert Sawyer; the Africa joined Philip Broke's squadron during the War of 1812, capturing several ships. He was promoted commander in 1813 and from 1813 to 1815, Lempriere was in command of HMS Trent which served as a hospital ship.

Sawyer, when Commander-in-Chief, Cork appointed Lempriere as his flag captain. Lempriere was placed on the retired list but was promoted to rear-admiral in 1854, vice-admiral in 1858, and finally admiral on 3 December 1863, shortly before his death.

== Family ==
Lempriere married Frances Dumaresq, daughter of William Dumaresq Esq, and Charlotte Dumaresq, a granddaughter of Admiral Thomas Dumaresq. They had four children:

- Captain Audley Lempriere (1834–1855), killed in the Crimean War outside Sebastopol during an attack on the Russian rifle pit.
- Captain Algernon Thomas Lempriere (1835–1874)
- Ellen Lempriere (1838–1908)
- Harriet Lempriere (1843–1901)
