= Charles Wilson, 1st Baron Moran =

Personal doctor to Winston Churchill (1882–1977)

The Right Honourable The Lord Moran MC PRCP
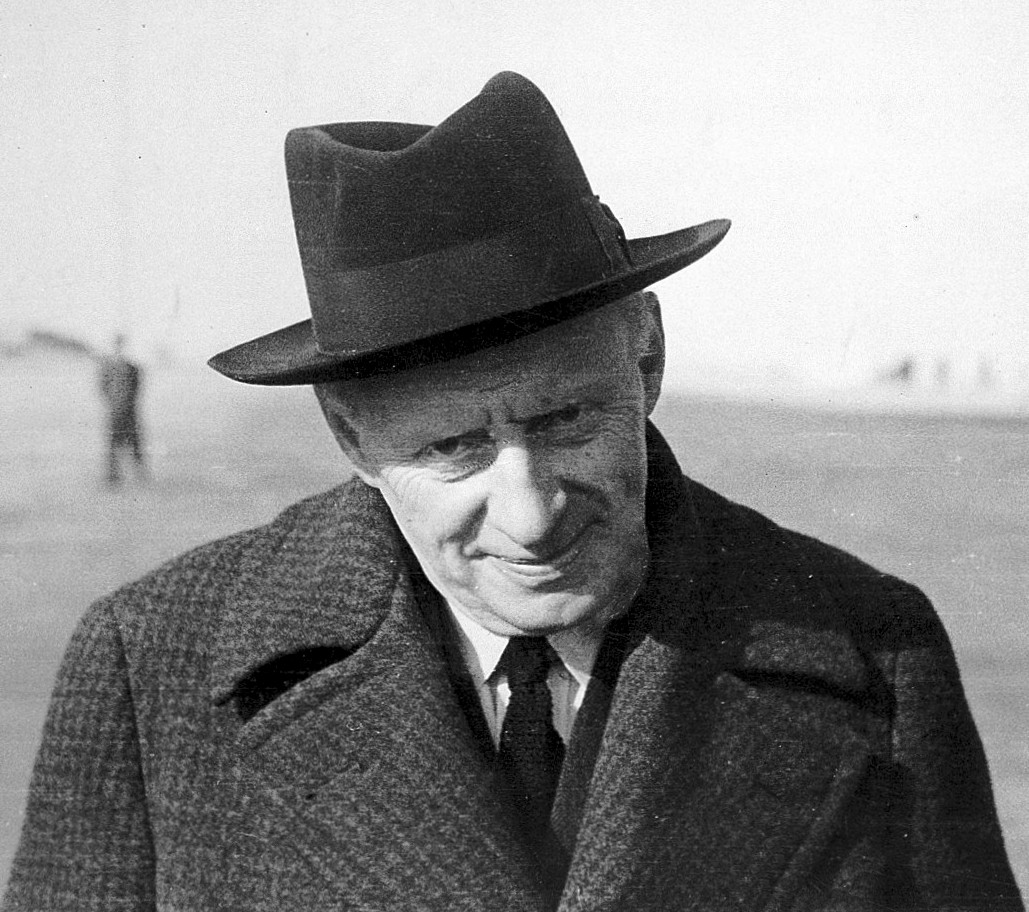
- Charles McMoran Wilson c. 1943

Member of the House of Lords as Baron Moran
- In office 8 March 1943 – 12 April 1977
- Preceded by: Peerage created
- Succeeded by: John Wilson

President of the Royal College of Physicians
- In office 1941–1949
- Preceded by: Sir Robert Hutchinson
- Succeeded by: Walter Russell Brain

Personal details
- Born: 10 November 1882 Skipton, West Riding of Yorkshire, England
- Died: 12 April 1977 (aged 94) Newton Valence, Hampshire, England
- Spouse: Dorothy Dufton (m. 1919)
- Children: 2, including John
- Education: St Mary's Hospital Medical School

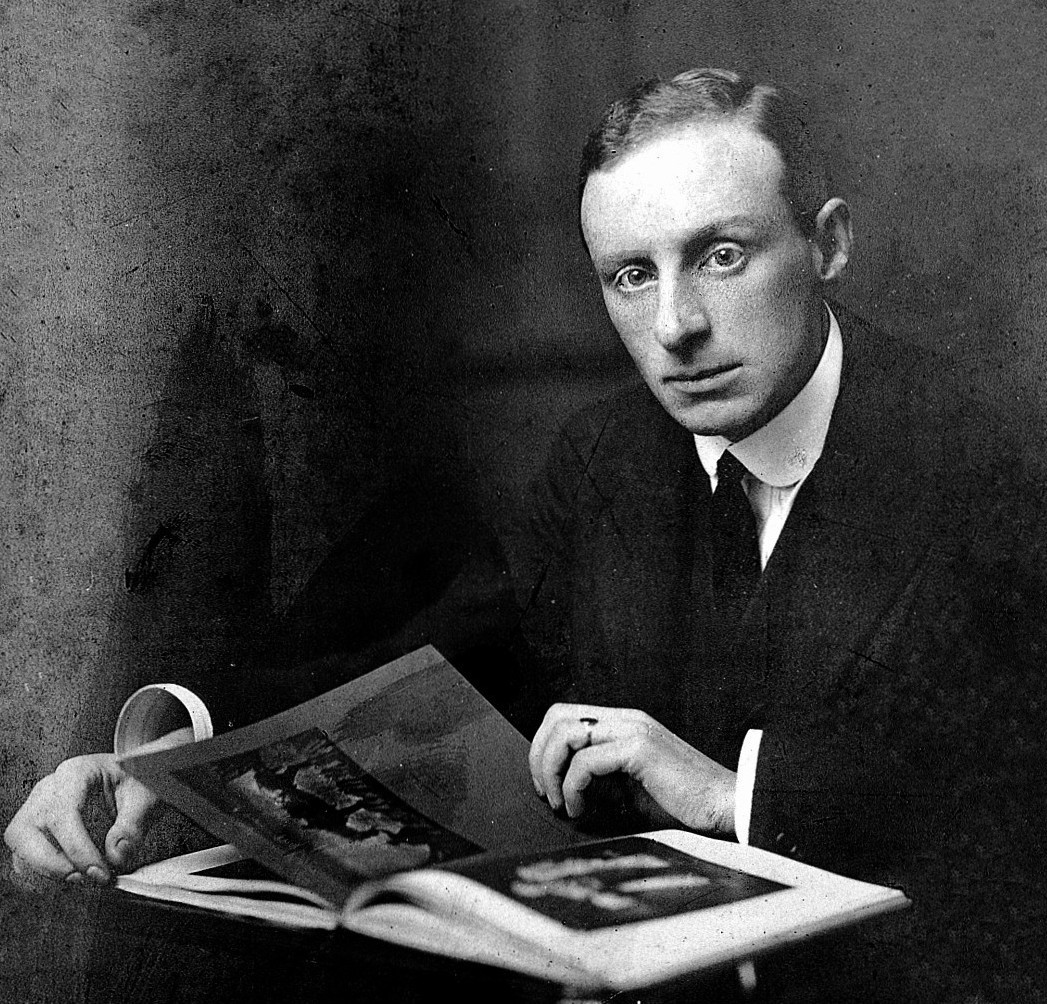
Charles McMoran Wilson c. 1900

Charles McMoran Wilson, 1st Baron Moran (10 November 1882 – 12 April 1977) was personal doctor to Winston Churchill from 1940 until the latter's death in 1965. His book The Struggle for Survival revealed much about Churchill's physical and psychological state, possibly including clinical depression, while coping with the strain of high office.

== Background ==
Moran was born in Skipton, Yorkshire, younger son and youngest of three children of John Forsythe Wilson, a physician and general practitioner from Northern Ireland, and his wife Mary Jane, daughter of the Reverend John Julius Hannah, a Presbyterian minister of Clogher.

He was educated at Pocklington Grammar School then studied medicine at St Mary's Hospital Medical School, now the Imperial College School of Medicine, graduating with a MBBS in 1908. He took his MD degree in 1913 at the same medical school. As a student he played in the college rugby fifteen as well as at county level for Middlesex.

He enlisted in the Royal Army Medical Corps in the First World War, rising to major. He was medical officer to the 1st Battalion of the Royal Fusiliers from 1914 to 1917 and medical officer in charge of the medical facilities at the British 7th Stationary Hospital in Boulogne from 1917 to 1918. He won the Military Cross in 1916 for services during the Battle of the Somme, and the Italian Silver Medal of Military Valour in 1917 and was twice mentioned in despatches. After the war, he conducted research into mustard gas poisoning.

== Later medical career ==
Longer term, based on his frontline experience, he developed his study into the effects of wartime conditions on the resilience of troops which was published in the 1930s as a series of lectures titled The Mind in War and culminated in a book The Anatomy of Courage, published in 1945 at the end of the Second World War. He lectured on courage to officer students at the Staff College in Camberley.

He was the dean of St Mary's Hospital Medical School between 1920 and 1945, where he oversaw the rebuilding of the premises, while also maintaining a private practice in London at Number 129, Harley Street. In 1938 he chaired a Home Office committee to plan the organization of London's hospitals to receive casualties expected in the then anticipated Second World War. He was a prominent scientist in his day, and was elected president of the Royal College of Physicians in April 1941 and was re-elected each year until 1950, when he resigned in favour of Russell Brain.

He was knighted in 1938 and was created Baron Moran, of Manton in the County of Wilts on 8 March 1943 and made his maiden speech in the House of Lords the same year, on the Beveridge Report. He was also involved in many other debates on the National Health Service. His skilfulness in negotiations with the British Medical Association and the Ministry of Health gave him the nickname "Corkscrew Charlie".

He helped set up the Spens Committee which laid down the remuneration of general practitioners and dentists, and chaired the government standing committee setting the payment of specialists from 1949 to 1961. He declined the appointment as a Knight Grand Cross of the Order of the British Empire (GBE) offered at the end of the chairmanship.

=== Churchill's physician and The Struggle for Survival ===
During his time as Winston Churchill's private physician, which began in May 1940, two weeks into Churchill's first term as prime minister, Moran accompanied Churchill on most of his travels, and met several prominent figures, including Anthony Eden, Field-Marshal Montgomery (later the 1st Viscount Montgomery of Alamein), Louis Mountbatten and Lord Beaverbrook. He also selected appropriate consulting specialists for Churchill when necessary. Although Moran found the travels frustrating when they conflicted with business planning the NHS in London, according to one biographer, Richard Lovell, Moran saw his patient as "the greatest Englishman since Chatham and regarded his care of him as his wartime duty".

In mid-1964, Clementine Churchill learned that Moran was planning to publish a book detailing his personal relationship with Churchill. Lady Churchill criticised his intentions, "I had always supposed that the relationship between a doctor and his patient was one of complete confidence…". Moran's book, The Struggle for Survival, is about Churchill during and after the war. It was published in 1966, fifteen months after Churchill's death, and aroused much controversy, as its detailed descriptions of Churchill's failing health appeared to constitute a breach of patient-doctor confidentiality. Moran claimed that he had compiled the book with Churchill's knowledge, although he had sought no permission to include conversations made in his professional capacity with the Cabinet Secretary, other officials and medical colleagues.

The book revealed that "Black Dog" was the name Churchill gave to "the prolonged fits of depression from which he suffered", leading many later authors to suggest that throughout his life Churchill was a victim of, or at risk from, clinical depression. Formulated in this way, Churchill's mental health history contains unmistakable echoes of the seminal interpretation of Moran's Black Dog revelations made in an essay by Anthony Storr. In drawing so heavily on Moran for what he took to be the latter's totally reliable, first-hand clinical evidence of Churchill's lifelong struggle with "prolonged and recurrent depression" and its associated "despair", Storr produced a seemingly authoritative and persuasive diagnostic essay that, in the words of John Ramsden, "strongly influenced all later accounts".

However, Storr was not aware that, as Lovell has shown, Moran, contrary to the impression created in his book, kept no actual diary during his years as Churchill's doctor. Nor was Storr aware that Moran's book as published was a much rewritten account which mixed together Moran's contemporaneous jottings with later material acquired from other sources. Wilfred Attenborough has demonstrated the key Black Dog "diary" entry for 14 August 1944 was an arbitrarily dated pastiche in which the explicit reference to Black Dog—the first of the few in the book (with an associated footnote definition of the term)—was taken, not from anything Churchill had said to Moran, but from much later claims made to Moran by Brendan Bracken (a non-clinician and wartime Minister of Information) in 1958. Although seemingly unnoticed by Storr and those he influenced, Moran later on in his book retracts his earlier suggestion, also derived from Bracken, that, towards the end of the Second World War, Churchill was succumbing to "the inborn melancholia of the Churchill blood". Also unnoticed by Storr and others is Moran's statement in his final chapter that Churchill had managed before the start of the First World War "to extirpate bouts of depression from his system".

Despite the difficulties with Moran's book, the many illustrations it provides of a Churchill understandably plunged into temporary low moods by military defeats and other severely adverse developments make a compelling portrait of a great man reacting to, but not significantly impeded by, worry and overstrain, consistent with the portraits of others who worked closely with Churchill. Moreover, it can be deduced from Moran's book that Churchill did not receive medication for depression—the amphetamine that Moran prescribed for special occasions, especially for big speeches from the autumn of 1953 onwards, was to combat the effects of Churchill's stroke of that year.

Besides medical observations, Moran also recounted personal political comments made by Churchill in conversation. Visiting Churchill on the afternoon following the announcement of the 1945 General Election results, Moran commiserated with him on the "ingratitude" of the British public for voting in a Labour government, to which Churchill, referring to the recent wartime hardships, replied "I wouldn't call it that. They have had a very hard time". He also recalled Churchill suggesting in 1946—the year before he put the idea (unsuccessfully) in a memo to President Truman—that the United States make a pre-emptive atomic bomb attack on Moscow while the Soviet Union did not yet possess nuclear weapons. The motivations behind the publication of Moran's book, The Struggle for Survival, and his criticisms of Churchill, may have been due to Moran's personal grievances against Churchill's staunch imperialist attitudes. He once stated: "Winston thinks only of the colour of their skin."

== Family and later life ==
Moran married in 1919 Dorothy Dufton. She was a research physiologist, who had been appointed MBE for work with the Ministry of Munitions in World War I. They had two sons, including John. He died in 1977 in Newton Valence, Hampshire, and was buried in the churchyard there. He was survived by his wife, who died in 1983.

Moran said he was a descendant of essayist William Hazlitt.

== Publications ==
- The Anatomy of Courage (1945), London: Constable, ISBN 0-09-451390-2
- Winston Churchill: The Struggle for Survival (1966) London: Constable, ISBN 0-7867-1706-8
- Churchill taken from the Diaries of Lord Moran: The Struggle for Survival, 1940–1965 (1966 – 1st American ed.) Boston: Houghton Mifflin.
- Churchill at War 1940 to 1945: the memoirs of Churchill's doctor, with an introduction by Lord Moran's son, John, the second Lord Moran, who held the title at the time. This diary paints an intimate portrait of Churchill by Sir Charles Wilson, his personal physician (Lord Moran), who spent the war years with the Prime Minister. In his diary, Moran recorded insights into Churchill's character, and moments when he let his guard down. New York: Carroll & Graf, 2002. Reissue ISBN 0-7867-1041-1

Academic offices
Preceded by Sir Robert Hutchinson, Bt	President of the Royal College of Physicians; 1941–1949	Succeeded by Walter Russell Brain
Peerage of the United Kingdom
New creation	Baron Moran; 1943–1977	Succeeded by Richard John Wilson
