= Robert Morier =

British diplomat (1826–1893)

The Right Honourable Sir Robert Morier GCB GCMG
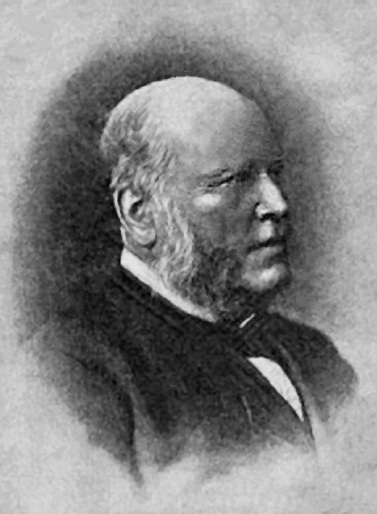

British Ambassador to Russia
- In office 1884–1893
- Preceded by: Sir Edward Thornton
- Succeeded by: Sir Frank Lascelles

Personal details
- Born: 31 March 1826 Paris, France
- Died: 16 November 1893 (aged 67) Montreux, Switzerland
- Spouse: Alice Peel
- Relations: David Richard Morier (father)
- Education: Balliol College, Oxford
- Occupation: Diplomat

Sir Robert Burnett David Morier GCB GCMG PC (31 March 1826 – 16 November 1893) was a British diplomat, who most notably served as the British Ambassador to Russia between 1884 and 1893.

== Early life ==
Born in Paris, Morier was descended from a family of diplomats of Huguenot origin, including his father David Richard Morier and his uncle James Justinian Morier. After private education he came up to Balliol College, Oxford. Here he attracted the notice of Benjamin Jowett, who became a friend.

== Career ==
On leaving Oxford, Morier at first obtained an appointment in the Education Department, but resigned in 1852, and in the following year became attaché at Vienna. In the succeeding years he was attached in turn to almost every court in Germany. Restless in temperament and unconventional in method, he plunged into the vortex of German politics to a degree that did not always accord with the traditions of diplomacy.

The most important years of his career in Germany were from 1866 to 1871, when he was secretary of legation at Darmstadt. Here he became a trusted adviser of the crown princess, and through her acquired an intimate friendship with the crown prince (afterwards the emperor Frederick III), whose antagonism to Bismarck's reactionary policy met with cordial support from Morier's sturdy Liberalism. Bismarck, already jealous of British influence at court, honoured Morier with a hatred not lessened by the fact that Morier's knowledge of German politics was unrivalled outside Germany. On leaving Darmstadt, Morier became chargé d'affaires, first at Stuttgart, and then at Munich, and in 1876 was appointed minister at Lisbon. From 1881 to 1884 he was minister at Madrid. In December 1884 he became ambassador at St. Petersburg, and almost immediately had to face the alarming situation created by the Russian incursion into Afghanistan, known as the Panjdeh incident. Thanks to his efforts, a war that at one moment seemed inevitable was averted. His great popularity at the Russian court contributed towards a marked improvement in the relations between the two countries.

Bismarck took alarm at the lessening influence of Germany over Russia, and tried to procure Morier's downfall. The Kölnische Zeitung declared in December 1888 that Morier had made use of his position at Darmstadt during the Franco-Prussian War to betray the movements of the German troops to Marshal Bazaine. The authority for this charge was an alleged declaration made by Bazaine to the German military attaché at Madrid, Adolf von Deines. Bazaine had died in September, but Morier had heard rumours in July of the charge brought against him, and had procured from Bazaine a written denial, which he now published in The Times. Apart from this, it was clearly shown that Morier could not have transmitted the information by the alleged date, and that Bazaine, according to the testimony of his own books and of other officers, received the information in question by reports from the front. As a matter of fact, Morier was an ardent champion of the German cause. His correspondence with Jowett shows the latter vainly endeavouring to convince his friend that the French were in the right. Public opinion everywhere, except in the German conservative press, attributed the charge to political motives.

== Marriage ==
Morier married in 1861 Alice Peel, second daughter of army officer and politician Jonathan Peel by his wife Lady Alice Jane, daughter of the 1st Marquess of Ailsa. Lady Morier died at Villa Montbrilliant at Cannes on 25 February 1903.

== Death ==
Morier's failing health caused him, at his own request, to be appointed Lord Dufferin's successor at Rome in 1891; but it was felt that he could not be spared from St. Petersburg, and there he remained until forced to find a milder climate. It was then too late, and he died at Montreux in Switzerland on 16 November 1893.

== Honours ==
Morier was appointed a Knight Commander of the Order of the Bath in October 1882 and he was appointed to the Privy Council of the United Kingdom in January 1885. In February 1886 he became a Knight Grand Cross of the Order of St Michael and St George and in September 1887 Morier was made a Knight Grand Cross of the Order of the Bath.

Diplomatic posts
Preceded by ?	British Chargé d'affaires to Württemberg; 1871–1872	Succeeded by George Petre
Preceded by Sir Henry Howard (as Minister)	British Chargé d'affaires to Bavaria; 1872–1876	Succeeded by Edward Stanton
Preceded by Hon. Edward Bulwer-Lytton	British ambassador to Portugal; 1876–1881	Succeeded by Sir Charles Lennox Wyke
Preceded by Hon. Lionel Sackville-West	British Ambassador to Spain; 1881–1884	Succeeded by
Preceded by Sir Edward Thornton	British Ambassador to Russia; 1884–1893	Succeeded by Sir Frank Lascelles
