= Charles Bulkeley Egerton =

British army officer (1774–1857)

General Sir Charles Bulkeley Egerton GCMG KCH
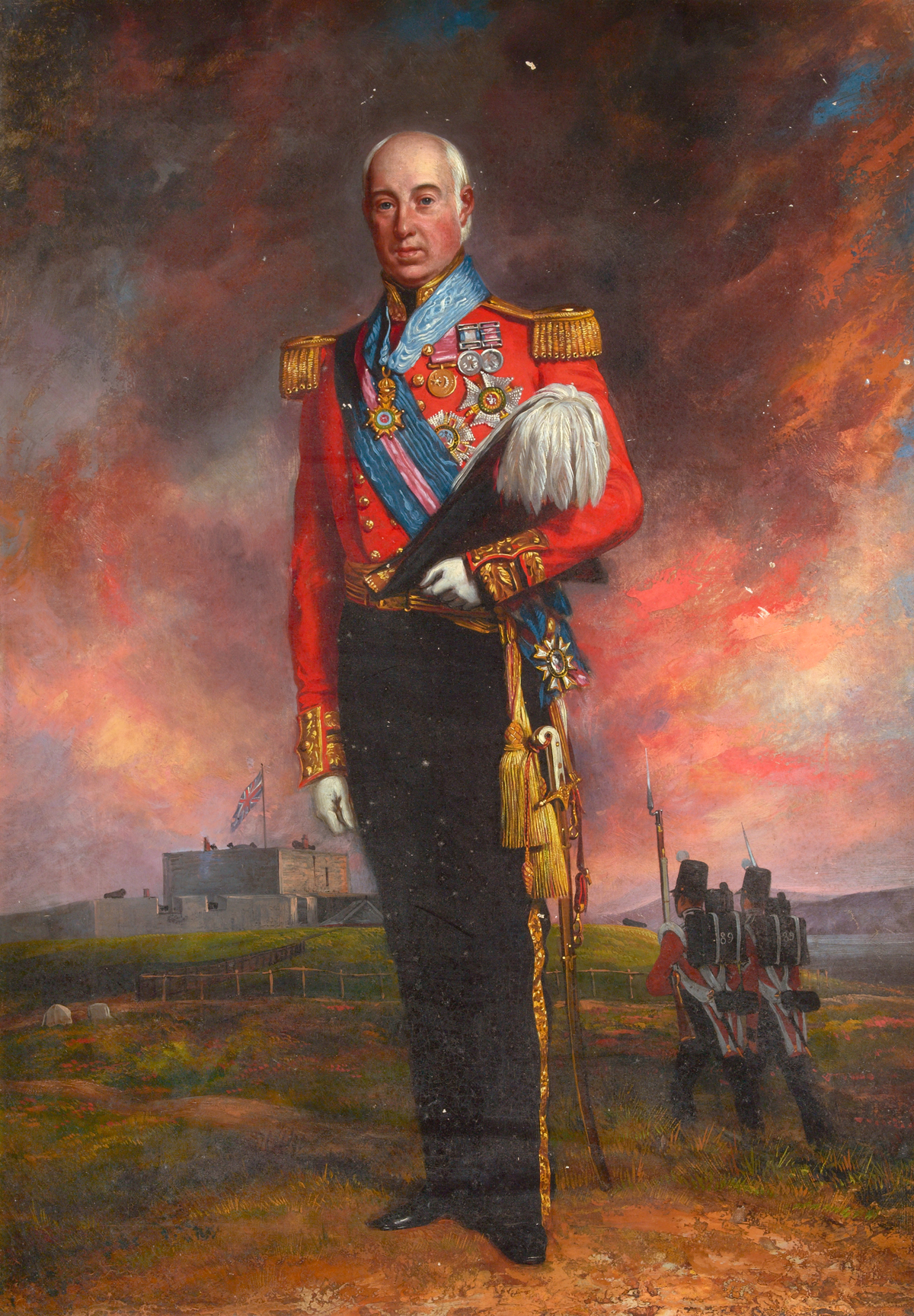
- Egerton before 1846
- Born: 5 June 1774; Cheshire
- Died: 15 July 1857 (aged 83); London
- Burial place: Hove
- Relatives: Sir John Egerton (brother); Sir Philip Egerton (brother); Sir Philip Egerton (nephew); Sir Thomas Troubridge (father-in-law)
- Military career
- Allegiance: United Kingdom
- Branch: British Army
- Service years: 1791–1857
- Rank: General
- Unit: 89th Regiment of Foot
- Commands: 2/44th Regiment of Foot; 2nd Brigade 5th Division
- Conflicts: French Revolutionary Wars; Glorious First of June; Irish Rebellion of 1798; Battle of Vinegar Hill; Egypt Campaign; Battle of Alexandria; Siege of Cairo; Napoleonic Wars; British invasions of the River Plate; Peninsular War; Battle of Roliça; Battle of Vimeiro; Battle of Sabugal; Battle of Fuentes de Oñoro; Siege of Cádiz
- Awards: Military General Service Medal

General Sir Charles Bulkeley Egerton GCMG KCH (5 June 1774 – 15 July 1857) was a British Army officer that served in the French Revolutionary Wars and Napoleonic Wars, He would command a brigade in the 5th Division during the Peninsular War.

== Life ==
Egerton was born in 1774 to Philip Egerton, and Mary Eyles, daughter of Sir Francis Haskins Eyles-Stiles and Sibella Egerton. He was the brother of Sir John Grey Egerton, 8th Baronet and Sir Philip Grey Egerton, 9th Baronet.

== Career ==
Egerton would begin his army career in 1793 as an Ensign in the 29th Regiment of Foot. During his service in the 29th, Egerton, now a Lieutenant, commanded a group of the 29th as marines on HMS Thunderer during the Glorious First of June in 1794.

In 1798 Egerton was promoted Major of the 89th Regiment of Foot, where he saw action in the Irish Rebellion of 1798 taking part in the Battle of Vinegar Hill. After the rebellion, Egerton and the 89th foot were posted in Malta in 1800, and in 1801 transferred to Egypt for the Egyptian Campaign where he took part in the Battle of Alexandria and the Siege of Cairo.

Egerton was made a Lieutenant Colonel 1802 in the 9th Regiment of Foot. The 9th Foot sailed to Portugal for the Peninsular War where it took part in the Battle of Roliça and the Battle of Vimeiro.

In 1809 Egerton transferred to the 44th Regiment of Foot where he held command of the 2nd battalion. Egerton continued with the 44th foot throughout the Peninsular War, eventually commanding a whole brigade of the 5th Division.

Egerton was breveted Colonel in 1811, and Major-General in 1814. He saw advancement to Lieutenant-General on 22 July 1830 and the rank of General in 1846.

== Family ==
Sir Charles Bulkeley Egerton would marry Charlotte Troubridge, daughter of Rear-Admiral, Sir Thomas Troubridge, 1st Baronet and Frances Northall and would have issue:

- Charles Troubridge Egerton (-1839)
- Colonel Thomas Graham Egerton (1812–1855) died during the Siege of Sevastopol
- Captain Francis Philip Egerton R.N (-1893), married Georgiana Augusta Pitt, daughter of Rev. G Pitt, Vicar at Audlem.
