= Henry Francis Howard =

British diplomat

Sir Henry Francis Howard GCB (3 November 1809 – 28 January 1898) was a British diplomat who was envoy to several countries. He was a member of the aristocratic Howard family, influential Catholic nobility.

== Early life and family ==
Howard was born at Corby Castle, Cumberland, the second son of antiquarian Henry Howard and his second wife, Catherine Mary Neave, daughter of Sir Richard Neave, 1st Baronet. His elder brother Philip Henry Howard (1801–1883), who became a Member of Parliament for Carlisle.

Howard was a male-line descendant of the Dukes of Norfolk through Lord William Howard, younger son of Thomas Howard, 4th Duke of Norfolk by his second wife.

== Career ==
Howard entered the Diplomatic Service in 1828. He was Secretary of the British legation at The Hague 1845–1846 and at Berlin 1846–1853; Minister to Brazil 1853–1855; Minister to Portugal 1855–1859; Minister to Hanover 1859–1866; and finally was the last British Minister to the Kingdom of Bavaria 1866–1872 (the post was downgraded to chargé d'affaires after Bavaria joined the German Empire).

Howard was appointed CB on 10 February 1863 and knighted KCB only three weeks later. He was promoted to GCB after his retirement in 1872.

== Marriage and issue ==
In 1830, Howard married the Hon. Sevilla Erskine, fourth daughter of David Erskine, 2nd Baron Erskine. They had two daughters before she died in 1835 in Munich:

- Isabella Howard (6 July 1832 – 9 July 1905), Dominican nun at Stone Priory
- Adela Howard (3 November 1834 – 17 January 1914), Benedictine nun at Atherstone Priory

In 1841, he married Baroness Marie Ernestine von der Schulenburg, fifth daughter of Leopold von der Schulenburg of Gut Priemern, Prussia. They had five children:

- Sevilla Catherine Howard (29 July 1842 – 23 August 1846), died young
- Sir Henry Howard (1843–1921), diplomat and the first formal British envoy to the Vatican in more than 300 years
- Catherine Mary (3 April 1846 – 15 February 1905), married in 1873 Count Ernst von Rechberg
- Maj.-Gen. Francis Howard (1848–1930)
- Mary Louise (4 February 1850 – 10 September 1940), married in 1872 Baron Ludwig von Aretin

Lady Howard died in 1897. He died the following year in Munich.

Diplomatic posts
Preceded by Henry Southern	Envoy Extraordinary and Minister Plenipotentiary to the Emperor of Brazil; 1853–1855	Succeeded by Peter Scarlett
Preceded by Sir Richard Pakenham	Envoy Extraordinary and Minister Plenipotentiary to His Most Faithful Majesty the King of Portugal and the Algarves; 1855–1859	Succeeded by Sir Arthur Magenis
Preceded by George Gordon	Envoy Extraordinary and Minister Plenipotentiary to the King of Hanover; 1859–1866	Succeeded by Charles Wyke
Preceded by Lord Augustus Loftus	Envoy Extraordinary and Minister Plenipotentiary to the King of Bavaria; 1866–1872	Succeeded by Robert Morier (as chargé d'affaires)
