= List of diplomats of the United Kingdom to Hanover =

The following is a list of Diplomats from the United Kingdom (and predecessors) to the Electorate and then Kingdom of Hanover:

== Heads of Mission ==
=== To the Duke of Brunswick-Lauenberg ===
1689–1692: Sir William Dutton Colt also to Hesse-Cassel and Brunswick-Wolfenbüttel

=== To the Elector of Hanover and others ===
The same diplomat was commonly accredited to the Elector, to the Duke of Celle and The Electress Sophia, often also to the Duke of Brunswick-Wolfenbüttel

- 1692–1693: Sir William Dutton Colt
- 1693–1703: James Cressett Envoy Extraordinary
  - 1701: Charles Gerard, 2nd Earl of Macclesfield, Charles Mohun, 4th Baron Mohun and Gregory King the Lancaster Herald Special Mission
- 1702–1703: Charles Finch, 4th Earl of Winchilsea
- 1703–1705: Edmund Poley
- 1705–1709: Brigadier Emanuel Howe
  - 1706: Charles Montagu, Baron Halifax, Lionel Sackville, Earl of Dorset, John Vanbrugh, Joseph Addison, and Peter Falaiseau (Pierre de Falaiseau)Special Mission
  - 1708: Maj.-Gen. Francis Palmes Special Mission
- 1709–1714: Isaac d'Alais Chargé d'affaires 1709-1711 then Secretary
  - 1710 and 1711: Richard Savage, 4th Earl Rivers Special Missions
  - 1712 and 1714: Thomas Harley Special Missions
- 1714: Edward Hyde, 3rd Earl of Clarendon Envoy Extraordinary
- 1714–1837: No mission, because the Elector (later King) of Hanover was also King of Great Britain.

=== Envoys Extraordinary and Ministers Plenipotentiary to the King of Hanover ===
- 1838–1856: The Hon. John Duncan Bligh
- 1857–1858: Sir John Crampton
- 1858/1859: George John Robert Gordon
- 1859–1866: Henry Francis Howard
- 1866: Sir Charles Lennox Wyke
