= Hugh James Arbuthnott =

British diplomat

Hugh James Arbuthnott, CMG (born 27 December 1936) is a retired British diplomat.

Son of James Gordon Arbuthnott and Margaret Georgiana, née Hyde. Married to Vanessa Rose Dyer, has three sons, Dominic Hugh, Justin Edward James (died 1989), and Giles Sebastian.

Educated at Ampleforth College and New College, Oxford, Arbuthnott was also a 2nd Lieutenant in Black Watch. He then joined HM Foreign (subsequently Diplomatic) Service during the years of 1960–96. Arbuthnott then served as the Head of European Integration Department (External), FCO, from 1974 to 1978. As well, Arbuthnott served in Paris as Counsellor (Agricultural & Economic), and then as Head of Chancery 1978–83.

Between 1986 and 1989, he was HM Ambassador to Romania. As Ambassador, in 1989, he attempted to personally send a letter to the dissident Doina Cornea at her home in the Transylvanian city of Cluj-Napoca. Securitate officers prevented him to do this, "pushing and manhandling" him, a behaviour that Britain described as "outrageous". The official response of the Romanian authorities was that Hugh Arbuthnott "infringed traffic regulations" and that Cornea's activities were an internal matter of Romania.

Between 1989 and 1993 he was the Ambassador to Portugal and between 1993 and 1996 to Denmark.

He is a coauthor of Hugh Arbuthnott and Geoffrey Edwards (1989). Common Man's Guide to the Common Market. Palgrave Macmillan. ISBN 0-333-40913-2.

== Honours ==
- Order of St Michael and St George, 1983

Diplomatic posts
Preceded by Philip McKearney	British Ambassador to Romania; 1986–89	Succeeded by Michael Atkinson
Preceded by Michael Simpson-Orlebar	British Ambassador to Portugal; 1989–93	Succeeded by Stephen Wall
Preceded by Nigel Williams	British Ambassador to Denmark; 1993–96	Succeeded by Andrew Bache
