= Thomas Dumaresq =

Royal Navy Admiral (1729–1802)

Admiral Thomas Dumaresq
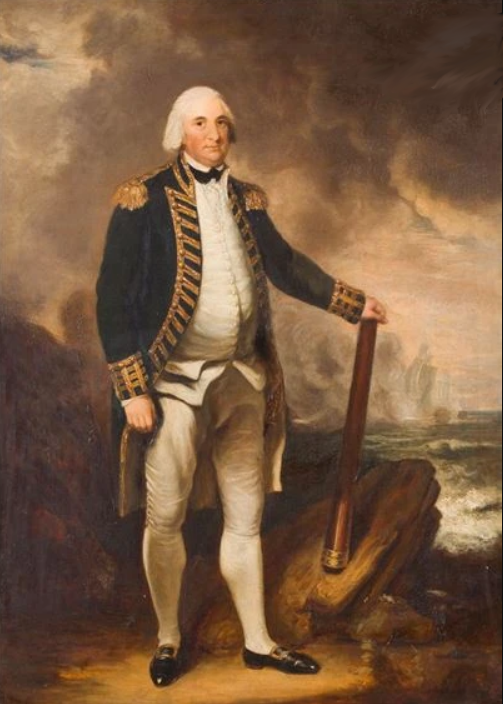
- Domenico Pellegrini (1759 - 1840) portrait of Admiral Thomas Dumaresq, 1802
- Born: 1729; Jersey
- Died: 18 July 1802 (aged 72–73)
- Allegiance: Kingdom of Great Britain
- Branch: Royal Navy
- Service years: 1741–1802
- Rank: Admiral
- Commands: HMS Esther; HMS Spy; HMS Portland; HMS Ulysses; HMS Trident; HMS Repulse; HMS Alfred
- Conflicts: War of the Austrian Succession; Battle of Toulon; Seven Years' War; Battle of Quiberon Bay; American Revolutionary War; Battle of the Saintes; Battle of the Mona Passage

Admiral Thomas Dumaresq (1729 – 18 July 1802) was an officer in the British Royal Navy that rose to the rank of Admiral. Dumaresq was notable for his role as Captain of HMS Repulse in the Battle of the Saintes during the American Revolutionary War.

== Life ==
Thomas was born in 1729 to Jean Dumaresq and Ann Bokenham (niece of Captain William Bokenham), and was a member of the notable Dumaresq family of the Channel Islands.

He would obtain a commission as a lieutenant in 1755 and in 1763 he would obtain his first command, of the British Cutter, named the "Esther".

Thomas Dumaresq was promoted to Rear-Admiral in 1794, and a Vice-Admiral in 1795. On 1 January 1801, he was promoted to Admiral of the Blue.

== Issue with Privateers ==
During the American Revolution an order was given to seize all ships and vessels of the Thirteen-Colonies. This led to an increase of privateering and illegal privateers used by foreign powers and other British Colonies alike to still trade with the rebellious colonies. Vice-Admiral James Young who was commander-in-chief in the Leeward Islands Station made the decision to treat illegal privateering as piracy and seize any vessels without the proper commission.

In 1777, Captain Thomas Dumaresq who commanded HMS Portland, the flag-ship of Vice-Admiral James Young was involved in an incident where the Portland seized the Hammond, a privateering ship from British Antigua. Due to the tribunal of the Court of Vice-Admiralty at Antigua declaring the privateers as legal, The owners of the Hammond had Vice-Admiral James Young and Captain Thomas Dumaresq arrested for the seizing of their ship and the impressing part of the crew. Young wrote to John Montagu, 4th Earl of Sandwich who was First Lord of the Admiralty to get clemency for both him and Dumaresq. However, King George III would tell Lord Sandwich to resolve the matter quickly while not provoking the privateers due to the outcome it would have with neighbouring powers.

On 3 June 1777 Dumaresq was found guilty of impressment by the Court of Common Pleas of Antigua and had to pay £950 what is approximately £160,000 in today's currency. To Dumaresq's luck, Lord Sandwich brought forth the government's plan to deal with the issue of illegal privateering altogether. Privateer Commissions would be granted by the colonial governors to all current illegal privateers and them would be able to keep their prizes they have already taken. The only condition was that all charges against all naval officers were dropped. If Dumaresq's charges were not dropped it could have had distress effects for the navy that could result in a reluctance of naval officers to sign-on new seamen due to fear of being charged with of impressment.

== Battle of the Saintes ==
Thomas Dumaresq, who was a Captain at the time of the Battle of the Saintes, which was a battle in the West Indies between the British Navy and French Navy. Dumaresq Commanded HMS Repulse in the center under Admiral Sir George Rodney. His crew, what is described by Edward Fraser as "smart set of Guernsey lads" would suffer 3 deaths and 11 wounded. In the aftermath of the Battle of the Saintes Dumaresq, now in command of HMS Alfred would take part of the Battle of the Mona Passage under Rear-Admiral Sir Samuel Hood.

== The Savanna-la-Mar Hurricane ==
During 1780, Rear-Admiral Joshua Rowley was sent to reinforce Jamaica against a possible Spanish threat. However, in October 1780 a hurricane formed off the coast of South America and would damage many British vessels, with the transport ship Monarch being sunk. Dumaresq, who was the Captain of the Ulysses was caught in this storm on October 6, 1780, resulting in only the foremast standing on the Ulysses. Having to drop all guns on the upper deck, Dumaresq would not get to Jamaica until the 26th of October 1780.

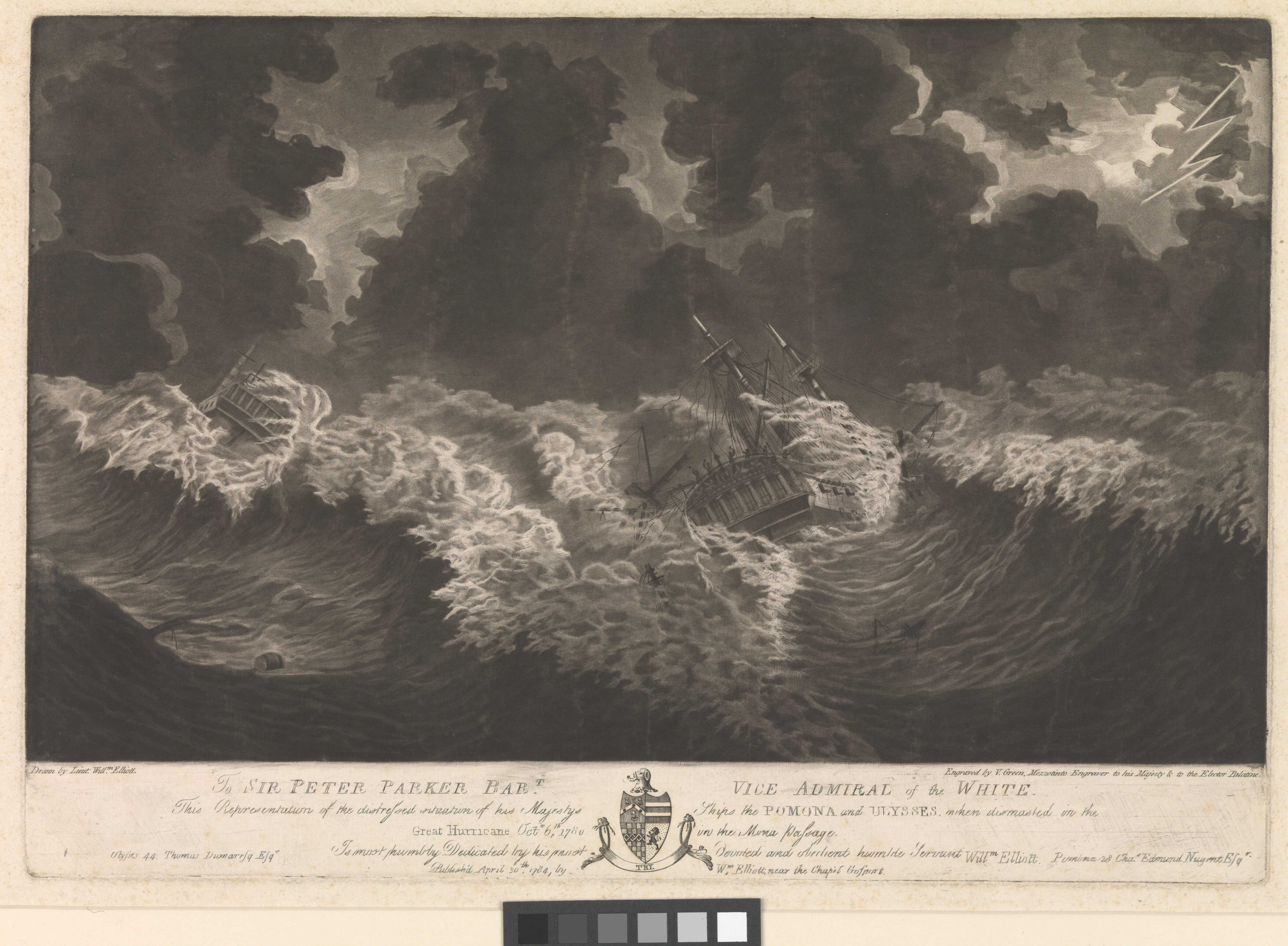

== Pelham Place ==
With the prize money obtained from his command of HMS Repulse under Lord Rodney during the Battle of the Saints Dumaresq would purchase the land of Pelham in Newton Valence, Hampshire and build Pelham Place. Pelham Place still stands today and is classified as a Grade II Listed Building.

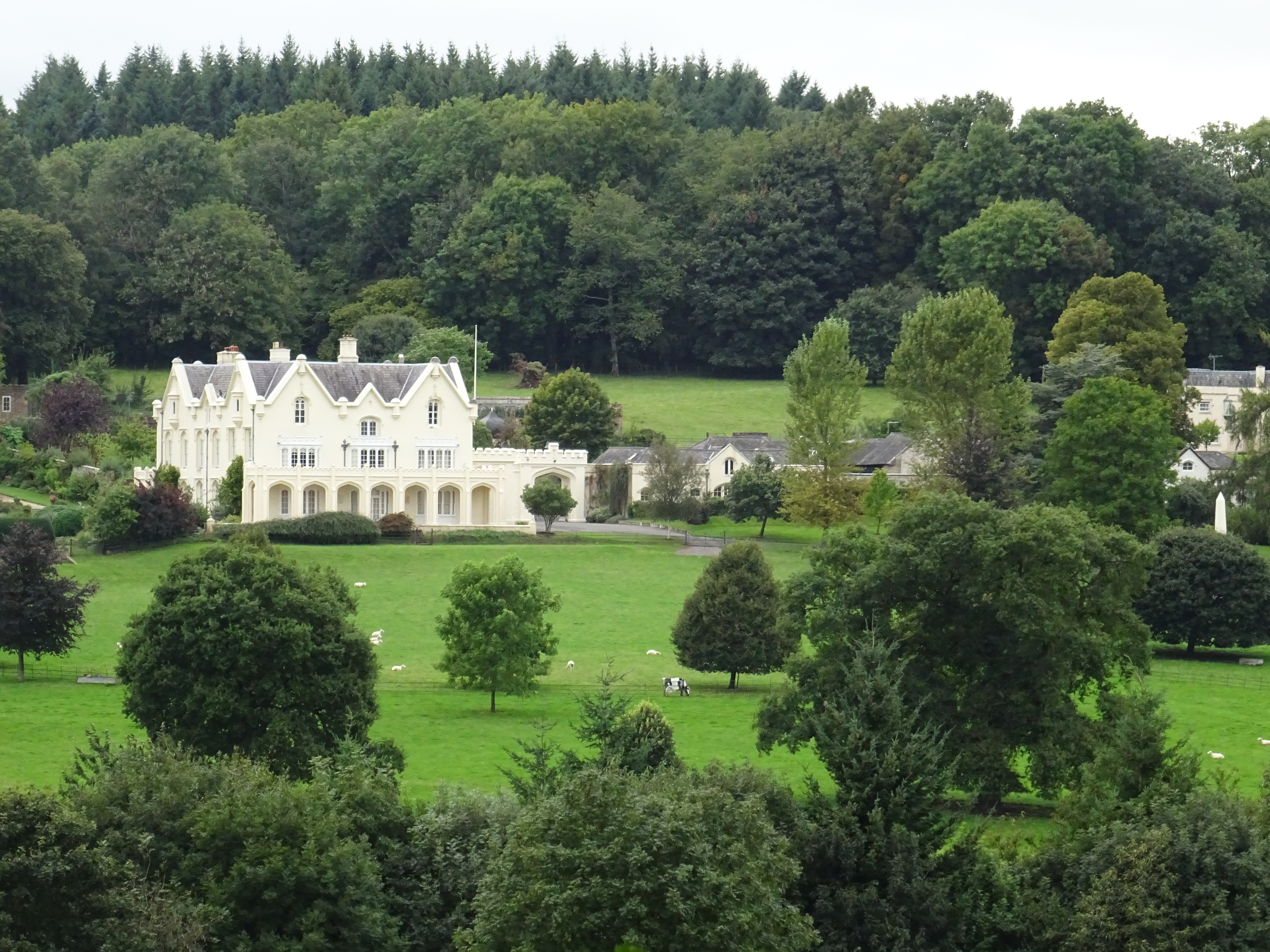

== Family ==
Thomas Dumaresq had one daughter;

- Charlotte Dumaresq who married her first cousin William Dumaresq, son of Captain William Dumaresq (brother of Thomas Dumaresq). They had the following issue;
  - Frances Dumaresq m. Admiral George O. Lempriere (1787–1864)

== Ancestry ==
Ancestors of Admiral Thomas Dumaresq

16. John Dumaresq, Seigneur of Samarès
8. Abraham Dumaresq, Seigneur of Augres
17. Collette Dumaresq
4. Elias Dumaresq, 3rd Seigneur of Augrès
18. Philippe de Carteret I, 2nd Seigneur of Sark
9. Susan De Carteret
Racheal Paulet
2. John Dumaresq, Greffier of the Royal Court
10. Thomas Payne
5. Jane Payne
11. Jeanne Poingdestre
1. Thomas Dumaresq
Harry Bokenham
3. Anne Bokenham
