= Welsh Federation of Sea Anglers =

Governing body of sea angling in Wales

- Sport: Sea angling
- Jurisdiction: National
- Abbreviation: WFSA
- Founded: 1955
- Location: Wales
- President: Julian Lewis Jones
- Chairman: Dr John O Connor
- Secretary: Helen Pearce

Official website
- www.wfsa.org.uk
- (Wales)

The Welsh Federation of Sea Anglers (WFSA) (established 1955) is the national governing body of sea angling in Wales. It organises major angling events at regional and national levels. The WFSA fights for member clubs' access to, and fishing from, threatened facilities, as well as organising the election of individuals and teams to represent Wales at international sea angling competitions.

The Welsh Federation of Sea Anglers is based in Wales.

== See also ==
- Federation of Welsh Anglers
- Welsh Federation of Coarse Anglers
- Welsh Salmon and Trout Angling Association
