= Federation of Welsh Anglers =

Governing body of angling in Wales

- Sport: sea, coarse and game fishing
- Jurisdiction: National
- Abbreviation: FWA
- Founded: 2005
- Location: Hirwaun, Rhondda Cynon Taf
- Coach: Helen Pearce

Official website
- www.fed-welshanglers.co.uk
- (Wales)

The Federation of Welsh Anglers (FWA) is the umbrella body for the three national governing bodies for sea, coarse and game fishing in Wales – the Welsh Federation of Sea Anglers, the Welsh Federation of Coarse Anglers and the Welsh Salmon and Trout Angling Association. Founded in 2005, the FWA is responsible for the development of angling coaching in Wales.

The Federation of Welsh Anglers is based in Hirwaun, Rhondda Cynon Taf.

== See also ==
- Welsh Federation of Coarse Anglers
- Welsh Federation of Sea Anglers
- Welsh Salmon and Trout Angling Association
