= Charles Lennox Wyke =

British diplomat

Sir Charles Lennox Wyke, GCMG, KCB (2 September 1815 – 4 October 1897) was a British diplomat.

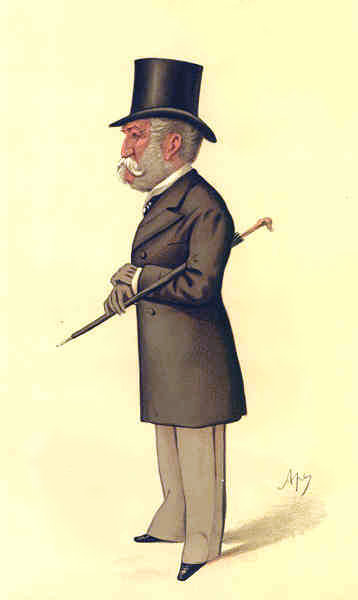
1884 Vanity Fair caricature of Wyke

Wyke was born on 2 September 1815, was the son of George Wyke, of Robbleston, Pembrokeshire, captain in the Grenadier Guards, by his wife Charlotte, daughter of F. Meyrick. He was a Lieutenant in the Royal Fusiliers, and afterwards a captain on the King of Hanover's staff. In 1847 he was appointed vice-consul at Port-au-Prince, and in 1852 consul-general in Central America, where he had lost his health. The U.K. had a strong interest in the region, with British Honduras. On 31 October 1854 he was appointed chargé d'affaires, and on 8 August 1859 he was nominated envoy extraordinary. In the same year he was gazetted C.B.

On 23 January 1860 he was moved to Mexico as minister plenipotentiary to the republic and he was created K.C.B. on 22 May. In March 1861 Benito Juárez was elected constitutional president of the Mexican republic following his service as President during the three-year civil war (1858–1860) with conservatives; he had succeeded to the presidency from being President of the Supreme Court with the resignation of President Ignacio Comonfort. During the war, Juárez had dictatorial powers. The war had left Mexican finances in shambles. Wyke was appointed to his post in Mexico to deal with the Mexican debt crisis. He and the French minister to Mexico, Saligny, were to collaborate on the mediation. Wyke drafted a memo to the UK government, with his fears of Mexico's financial collapse and expectation of social dissolution there. "The blend was an ominous diagnosis of a country in the last stages of decay." On 17 July the Mexican congress suspended payment of public bonds for two years, knowing there was the possibility of that triggering foreign intervention to collect debts. Juárez's Minister of Foreign Relations Manuel María Zamacona had tried to ward off intervention and negotiated with Wyke, since the U.K. was the largest bond holder. They signed the Wyke-Zamacona Agreement on 21 November 1861, but Mexican congress repudiated it 22–23 November and Zamacona resigned from Juárez's. The failure of the agreement left Juárez's government isolated.

In consequence of the postponement of debt payment, France and England broke off diplomatic relations with the republic on 27 July, and Wyke left Mexico City in December with all his staff, with the failure of the Wyke-Zamacona Agreement. Wyke remained in Mexico to carry on the negotiations connected with the joint intervention of England, France, and Spain. When the design of France, however, to subvert the Mexican government became apparent, England and Spain withdrew from the alliance, and Wyke returned home. On 19 January 1866 he was accredited to Hanover, but in September his mission was cut short by the Austro-Prussian War and the annexation of Hanover by Prussia. In the following year he was appointed (on 16 December) minister at Copenhagen, where he remained for fourteen years. In August 1879 he was created G.C.M.G., and on 22 June 1881 he was transferred to Portugal, where he remained till the close of his diplomatic career. He retired on a pension on 21 February 1884 and was nominated a Privy Councillor on 6 Feb. 1886. Wyke died unmarried on 4 October 1897 at his residence, 23 Cheyne Walk, Chelsea, London.

Diplomatic posts
Preceded by Robert Morier	British ambassador to Portugal; 1881–1884	Succeeded by George Petre
Preceded by Loftus Charles Otway	Envoy Extraordinary and Minister Plenipotentiary to the Emperor of Mexico; 1860–1864	Succeeded by Peter Campbell Scarlett
Preceded by Henry Francis Howard	Envoy Extraordinary and Minister Plenipotentiary to the King of Hanover; 1866	Succeeded by None
