= Edward Michael Ward =

Anglo-Irish diplomat

Edward Michael Ward (5 February 1789 – 12 September 1832) was an Anglo-Irish diplomat.

He was the oldest son of Robert Ward and his first wife Sophia Frances Whaley, third daughter of Richard Chapel Whaley. His younger brother James was a vice-admiral in the Royal Navy.

Ward served as secretary of legation at Stuttgart from 1814. He was transferred to Lisbon in 1816 and was appointed Chargé d'Affaires to the Court of Portugal in 1820, an office he held until 1823. In the following year, Ward came as secretary of embassy to St Petersburg and was thereupon nominated Minister Plenipotentiary to the Emperor of Russia ad interim until 1825. Subsequently, he was for one year in Vienna and became Envoy Extraordinary and Minister Plenipotentiary to the Court of Saxony in 1828, returning to England in 1832.

On 14 September 1815, he married Lady Matilda Stewart, daughter of Robert Stewart, 1st Marquess of Londonderry, and had by her a daughter and a son. Ward died at Brighton, aged 43, a year after his father and only months after his younger brother Bernard.

Diplomatic posts
Preceded by Edward Thornton	Chargé d'Affaires to the Court of Portugal; 1820–1823	Succeeded by Sir Edward Thornton
Preceded by Hon. Frederick Cathcart	Minister Plenipotentiary to the Emperor of Russia ad interim 1824–1825	Succeeded by Edward Cromwell Disbrowe
Preceded by George William Chad	Envoy Extraordinary and Minister Plenipotentiary to the Court of Saxony; 1828–1832	Succeeded by Hon. Francis Reginald Forbes
