= Thomas Graham Egerton =

British Army officer (1812–1855)

Colonel Thomas Graham Egerton
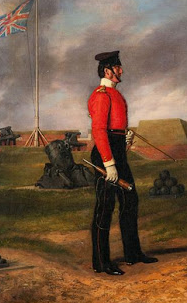
- Born: c. 1811
- Died: 19 April 1855; Crimea, Russian Empire
- Burial place: Chester
- Relatives: General Sir Charles Bulkeley Egerton (Father); Sir Thomas Troubridge, 1st Baronet (Grandfather)
- Military career
- Allegiance: United Kingdom
- Branch: British Army
- Service years: 1829–1855
- Rank: Colonel
- Unit: 77th (East Middlesex) Regiment of Foot
- Conflicts: Crimean War: Battle of the Alma; Battle of Inkerman; Siege of Sevastopol (1854–1855)

Colonel Thomas Graham Egerton was a British Army officer in the 77th (East Middlesex) Regiment of Foot during the Crimean War.

== Life ==
Egerton was born c. 1811 to General Sir Charles Bulkeley Egerton, and Charlotte Troubridge, daughter of Admiral Sir Thomas Troubridge, 1st Bt.

== Career ==
Egerton, of the 90th Foot, 2nd West India Regiment, was promoted to captain in 1835. During the Crimean War, Egerton served in the 77th Regiment.

During the Battle of Alma in 1854, Egerton, now a Colonel, was ordered by General George Buller to advance with the 77th Regiment to provide support to a brigade further ahead. Egerton refused this order as he believed that there were Russian battalions just ahead of them with cavalry support, and ordered his regiment to form a hollow square. This led General Buller to take Egerton's word and follow suit with the other regiments. This action saved many of the British forces during the battle.

During the Battle of Inkerman, Egerton led four companies of the 77th Regiment against an overwhelming Russian force. In this battle, he was able to command his force effectively and send the enemy retreating, despite being outnumbered 250 to 1,500.

During the Siege of Sevastopol, on 19 April 1855, Egerton was in command of an attack of three Russian rifle pits. During the first wave of the attack, a young Captain Audley Lempriere, who Egerton treated as his own son, was killed during the assault. Egerton is said to have carried his body off the field of battle while declaring "they shall never take my child". Egerton led the second attack against the Russian rifle pits, but was killed in the process of the capture of the rifle pits. Due to Egerton's sacrifice, the rifle pit became known as Egerton's Pit after the capture.

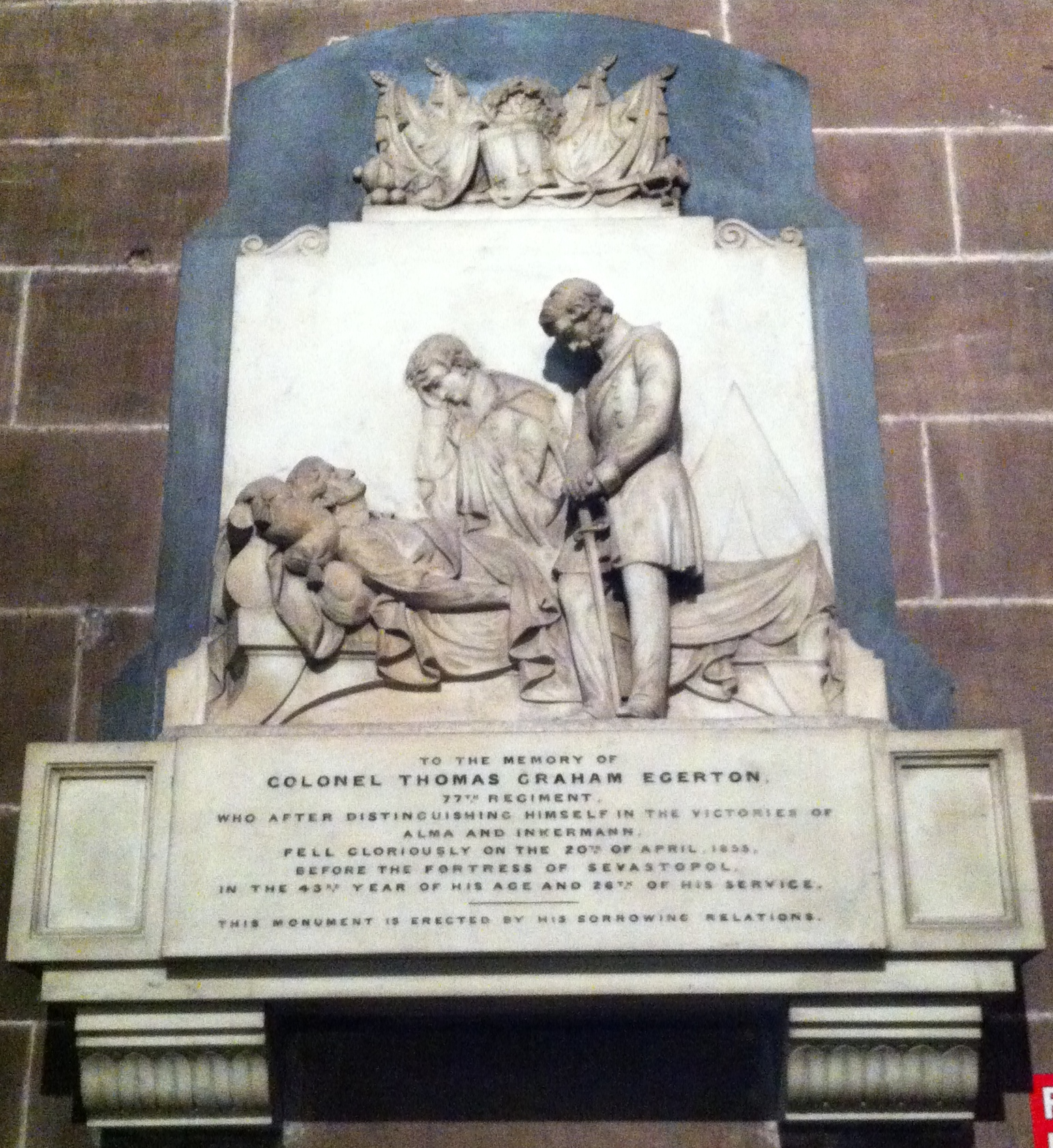

== Burial ==
He was buried in the 77th Regiment's graveyard next to Captain Audley Lempriere, who he regarded as his child.

His service and death are commemorated in a memorial wall monument at Chester Cathedral that was paid for by his family.
