= Welsh Federation of Coarse Anglers =

Governing body of coarse fishing in Wales

- Sport: Coarse fishing
- Abbreviation: WFCA
- Founded: 1977
- Location: Briton Ferry, Neath Port Talbot
- Chairman: Bernard Farr
- Secretary

Official website
- www.welshfederationofcoarseanglers2009.co.uk
- (Wales)

The Welsh Federation of Coarse Anglers (WFCA) is the national governing body for coarse fishing in Wales. It was established in 1977 and by 2003 had 69 affiliated clubs and over 23,000 members.

The Welsh Federation of Coarse Anglers is based at Briton Ferry, Neath Port Talbot.

== See also ==
- Federation of Welsh Anglers
- Welsh Federation of Sea Anglers
- Welsh Salmon and Trout Angling Association
