= Edward Stanton (British Army officer) =

British army officer and diplomat (1827–1907)

General Sir Edward Stanton KCB KCMG

British Ambassador to Bavaria
- In office 1876–1882
- Preceded by: Robert Morier
- Succeeded by: Hugh MacDonell

Personal details
- Born: 19 February 1827 Painswick, Gloucestershire
- Died: 24 June 1907 (aged 80) Stroud, Gloucestershire
- Spouse: Margarette Constance Starkey (m. 1862)
- Education: Royal Military Academy, Woolwich
- Occupation: Diplomat

Military service
- Allegiance: United Kingdom
- Branch/service: British Army
- Years of service: 1844–1907
- Rank: General
- Unit: Royal Engineers
- Battles/wars: Crimean War

General Sir Edward Stanton KCB KCMG (19 February 1827 – 24 June 1907) was a British Army officer and diplomat.

== Early life ==
Edward Stanton was born in Painswick, Gloucestershire, the son of William Henry Stanton, of Stroud, Gloucestershire, and his wife, Jane. He was educated at Woolwich Academy.

== Career ==
Stanton was commissioned as second lieutenant in the Royal Engineers on 19 December 1844. He served in the Crimean War. From 1856 to 1857, he served on the boundary commission that determined the Russo-Turkish borders.

He was appointed Consul-General in Warsaw, Poland on 7 December 1860, Agent and Consul-General in Egypt on 15 May 1865, and Chargé d'Affaires to the King of Bavaria on 10 May 1876. During his visit to Egypt, English author and poet Edward Lear described Sir Edward Stanton as "very good-natured". Sir Edward Stanton retired as a general in 1881.

== Family ==
In 1862, Edward Stanton married Margarette Constance Starkey. He was a relative on her mother's side of the family. His son Colonel Edward Alexander Stanton (1867–1947) served in Egypt at Omdurman, was Governor of Khartoum from 1900 to 1908, and military governor of Haifa (the Phoenicia Division of Palestine) from 1918 to 1920.

== Honours ==
Stanton was appointed a Companion of the Order of the Bath (CB) in 1857 and upgraded to a Knight Commander of the order (KCB) in 1905. He was knighted as a Knight Commander of the Order of St Michael and St George (KCMG) in 1882.

In addition to his British honours, Sir Edward Stanton was a Knight of the French Legion of Honour.

Diplomatic posts
Preceded by Lintorn Simmons^{1}	British Consul-General at Warsaw; 1860 – 1865	Succeeded by Charles Edward Mansfield^{2}
Preceded by Robert Colquhoun^{3}	British Agent and Consul-General in Egypt; 1865 – 1876	Succeeded by Lord Vivian^{4}
Preceded by Robert Morier^{5}	British Chargé d'Affaires to the King of Bavaria; 1876 – 1882	Succeeded by Hugh MacDonell^{6}
Notes and references
1. "No. 22102". The London Gazette. 26 February 1858. p. 970.; 2."No. 22984". The London Gazette. 27 June 1865. p. 3203. 3."No. 22219". The London Gazette. 14 January 1859. p. 128. 4."No. 24342". The London Gazette. 4 July 1876. p. 3820. 5."No. 23824". The London Gazette. 2 February 1872. p. 357. 6."No. 25080". The London Gazette. 3 March 1882. p. 949.
