= Stephen Wall =

British diplomat (born 1947)

Sir Stephen Wall GCMG LVO

48th British Ambassador to Portugal
- In office 1993–1995
- Preceded by: Hugh James Arbuthnott
- Succeeded by: Roger Westbrook

7th British Permanent Representative to the European Union
- In office 1995–2000
- Preceded by: John Kerr
- Succeeded by: Nigel Sheinwald

Personal details
- Born: John Stephen Wall; January 10, 1947 (age 79)
- Education: Douai School
- Alma mater: Selwyn College, Cambridge

Sir Stephen Wall GCMG LVO (born 10 January 1947) is a retired British diplomat who served as Britain's ambassador to Portugal and Permanent Representative to the European Union.

== Biography ==
Wall, who was educated at Douai School and Selwyn College, Cambridge, entered the Diplomatic Service in 1968. His early postings included the United Nations, Addis Ababa and Paris. On his return to London in 1974, he worked in the Foreign Office News Department and was later seconded to the press office of James Callaghan, who was then Prime Minister. He subsequently served as Assistant Private Secretary to David Owen, the Foreign Secretary and Lord Carrington, David Owen's successor.

Wall spent four years at the British Embassy, Washington, D.C. from 1979 to 1983, when he returned to the Foreign Office. From 1983 to 1988 he served as Assistant Head, and later Head, of the Foreign Office's European Community Department (Internal.) He was Private Secretary to the Foreign Secretary from 1988 to 1991, serving under Geoffrey Howe, John Major and Douglas Hurd. He was Private Secretary to Prime Minister John Major from 1991 to 1993, responsible for foreign policy and defence issues.

Wall was sent as Ambassador to Portugal in 1993, and he remained there until 1995, when he was named as Britain's Permanent Representative to the European Union. He returned to London in 2000 to takes charge of the Cabinet Office's European Secretariat as European adviser to Prime Minister Tony Blair. He remained in that post until 2004. He was named as principal adviser to Cormac Murphy-O'Connor, the Roman Catholic Archbishop of Westminster in June 2004, and he served until June 2005.

From 2009 to 2019 Sir Stephen Wall was chairman of Cumberland Lodge, an educational charity initiating fresh debate on the burning questions facing society. From 2005 to 2014, he was a Council Member at UCL and was Council Chair from 2008 to 2014. He was chair of the pro-EU 'Federal Trust' from 2010 to 2020.

From 2009 to 2014 he was co-chair of the Belgo-British Conference.

He was (2014–2021) a Board member (and later chair) of The Kaleidoscope Trust – a charity campaigning for LGBT rights overseas. He has worked as an Official Historian at the Cabinet Office, writing the Official History of Britain's relationship with the rest of the European Union.

== Personal life ==
Wall was married with one son. In 2014, Stephen Wall came out publicly as homosexual. He divorced in 2014. In 2019, he married Dr Edward Sumner, who died in 2021. He was Equalities Champion at UCL for LGBT+ issues. He said that reading Richard Dawkins' The God Delusion led him to abandon Catholicism.

== Bibliography ==
- A Stranger in Europe: Britain and the EU from Thatcher to Blair (OUP 2008)
- "The Official History of Britain and the European Community, Volume II: From Rejection to Referendum,1963 – 1975" (Routledge 2012); and Volume III: 'The Tiger Unleashed,1975 – 1985" ( Routledge 2018)
- Reluctant European: Britain and the European Union from 1945 to Brexit (OUP, 2020)
- Six novels of LGBT romance, published under a pseudonym.

== Offices held ==
Diplomatic posts
| Preceded by Sir Anthony Galsworthy | Principal Private Secretary to the Foreign Secretary; 1988–1990 | Succeeded by Sir Richard Gozney |
| Preceded by Charles Powell | Private Secretary for Foreign Affairs to the Prime Minister; 1991–1993 | Succeeded by Roderic Lyne |
| Preceded by Hugh James Arbuthnott | British Ambassador to Portugal; 1993–1995 | Succeeded by Roger Westbrook |
| Preceded by John, The Lord Kerr of Kinlochard | British Permanent Representative to the European Union; 1995–2000 | Succeeded by Sir Nigel Sheinwald |
Government offices
| Preceded by David Bostock | Director-General, European Secretariat; Cabinet Office; 2000–2004 | Succeeded by Sir Kim Darroch |
