= Hugh Byatt =

British diplomat (1927–2011)

Sir Hugh Byatt KCVO CMG

British Ambassador to Portugal
- In office 1981–1986
- Preceded by: Sir John Moran
- Succeeded by: Sir Michael Simpson-Orlebar

British Ambassador to Angola
- In office 1978–1981
- Preceded by: Post established
- Succeeded by: Sir Francis Kennedy

Personal details
- Born: 27 August 1927 Edinburgh
- Died: 16 February 2011 (aged 83) Tarbert, Scotland
- Children: 3
- Education: New College, Oxford
- Occupation: Diplomat

Sir Hugh Campbell Byatt (27 August 1927 – 16 February 2011) was a British diplomat. He served as British Ambassador to Angola from 1978 to 1981 and concurrently São Tomé and Príncipe from 1980 to 1981, and British Ambassador to Portugal from 1981 to 1986.

== Early life and education ==
Byatt was born on 27 August 1927 in Edinburgh, the eldest son of Sir Horace Byatt and Lady Byatt (née Olga Margaret Campbell). His parents died when he was young and he was raised by relatives. He was educated at Gordonstoun and New College, Oxford.

== Career ==
After performing his National Service in the Royal Naval Volunteer Reserve from 1945 to 1948 with the rank of sub-lieutenant, Byatt joined the Colonial Administrative Service in 1952. He served in Nigeria from 1952 to 1957, and after a year at the Commonwealth Relations Office, was transferred to Bombay, remaining in the post from 1961 to 1963. After returning to the Commonwealth Relations Office, he spent two years on secondment with the Cabinet Office. In 1967 he was dispatched to the British Embassy in Lisbon where he served as Head of Chancery until 1970, and then spent a year as assistant head of the South Asian Department at the Foreign and Commonwealth Office.

Byatt was then appointed consul-general in Mozambique, a post he held from 1971 to 1973. In what he later described as one of the most difficult assignments of his career, he was sent as consular observer to the trial of two British mercenaries captured by the Mozambique government. After serving as an Inspector of the Diplomatic Service from 1973 to 1975, and then spending a year on sabbatical at the Royal College of Defence Studies, he served as deputy high commissioner in Nairobi from 1977 to 1978.

Byatt then served as British Ambassador to Angola from 1978 to 1981. Arriving three years after it had secured independence from Portugal, the country was experiencing widespread social unrest and civil war. Described by The Times as an exceedingly challenging posting, "No British diplomat ever earned his CMG, in 1979, as hard as he did." Having also served as British Ambassador to São Tomé and Príncipe from 1980 to 1981 while Ambassador to Angola, in 1981 he was appointed British Ambassador to Portugal, serving in the post until his retirement in 1986. A highlight of his posting was the state visit to Portugal by Queen Elizabeth II in 1985 following which Byatt received a knighthood.

== Personal life and death ==
Byatt married Fiona Coats in 1954 and they had two sons and a daughter.

Byatt died on 16 February 2011 in Tarbert, Scotland, aged 83.

== Honours ==
Byatt was appointed Companion of the Order of St Michael and St George (CMG) in the 1979 Birthday Honours. He was appointed Knight Commander of the Royal Victorian Order (KCVO) in 1985. He was awarded the Knight Grand Cross of the Order of Christ of Portugal in 1985.

== See also ==
- Angola–United Kingdom relations
- São Tomé and Príncipe–United Kingdom relations
- Portugal–United Kingdom relations

Diplomatic posts
Preceded by New office	British Ambassador to Angola; 1978–1981	Succeeded by Sir Francis Kennedy
Preceded by Sir John Moran	British Ambassador to Portugal; 1981–1986	Succeeded by Sir Michael Simpson-Orlebar
