= James Cressett =

English diplomat

James Cressett or Cresset (c. 1655 – 26 July 1710) was an English diplomat.

Cressett was the son of James Cressett, Rector of Cound. In April 1671, aged 16, he matriculated at Oriel College, Oxford, gaining a B.A. in 1673-4 and an M.A. in 1677. In 1686 he joined Trinity College, Cambridge, and was a Fellow of Trinity Hall, Cambridge from 1690 to 1696. From 1693 to 1703 he was Envoy Extraordinary to Hanover.
