= HMS Repulse (1780) =

Intrepid-class ship of the line, 1780

- Repulse

History

Great Britain
- Name: HMS Repulse
- Ordered: 5 February 1777
- Builder: Fabian, East Cowes
- Laid down: 12 January 1778
- Launched: 28 November 1780
- Fate: Wrecked, 10 March 1800

General characteristics
- Class & type: Intrepid-class ship of the line
- Tons burthen: 1387 bm
- Length: 159 ft 6 in (48.62 m) (gundeck)
- Beam: 44 ft 4 in (13.51 m)
- Depth of hold: 19 ft (5.8 m)
- Propulsion: Sails
- Sail plan: Full-rigged ship
- Armament: 64 guns: Gundeck: 26 × 24 pdrs; Upper gundeck: 26 × 18 pdrs; Quarterdeck: 10 × 4 pdrs; Forecastle: 2 × 9 pdrs

HMS Repulse was a 64-gun third rate ship of the line of the Royal Navy, launched on 28 November 1780 at East Cowes, on the Isle of Wight.

She saw action on 12 April 1782 at the Battle of the Saintes under command of Captain Thomas Dumaresq. Her crew were described as "fine Guernsey lads".

== Mutiny at The Nore ==
At the mutiny at The Nore in 1797, Repulse made a 'miraculous' escape from the mutineers reaching shore despite receiving 'as was calculated two hundred shot'. Its First Lieutenant, Lieutenant T. Frances Douglas, was presented with a commemorative sword inscribed: ‘PRESENTED by the Committee of Merchants &c OF LONDON to LIEUT.T FRANCIS DOUGLAS for his Spirited and active conduct on board His Majesty’s Ship the REPULSE. Ja.s Alms Esq.r Commander during the MUTINY at the NORE in 1797. Marine Society Office, May 1o 1798 } Hugh Inglis Esq.r Chairman’

== Loss ==
On 10 March 1800, having been driven off course by heavy weather, Repulse struck a submerged rock and began taking on water. The crew eventually abandoned the ship somewhere in the vicinity of the Cap Sizun, on the Pointe de Penharn from where the majority of the survivors were taken away as prisoners of war. The first lieutenant took a number of men in Repulse's large cutter, and headed for England instead, arriving at Guernsey on 16 March.
