= Edward Thornton (cricketer) =

English military officer and cricketer (1893–1970)

Personal information
- Full name: Edward Thornton
- Born: 27 October 1893; Pease Pottage, Sussex, England
- Died: 18 October 1970 (aged 76); Stockport, Cheshire, England
- Batting: Unknown

Career statistics
Competition	First-class
Matches	1
Runs scored	59
Batting average	29.50
100s/50s	–/–
Top score	38
Catches/stumpings	–/–
- Source: Cricinfo, 15 March 2019

Edward Thornton, 3rd Count of Cacilhas (27 October 1893 – 18 October 1970) was an English first-class cricketer, British Army and Royal Air Force officer.

== Early life ==
Thornton was born at Woodhurst, Pease Pottage, Sussex, son of Edward Thornton (1856–1904), a diplomat who worked in Buenos Aires, Russia and the United States, and Emma Jessie, daughter of Philip Rawson, DL, of Woodhurst, Sussex. His grandfather was the diplomat Edward Thornton, 2nd Count of Cacilhas; on his grandfather's death in 1906, Thornton succeeded to the title as 3rd Count of Cacilhas (also "Cassilhas") due to his father's death two years earlier.

== Career ==
Thornton served during the First World War with the Royal Fusiliers, holding the rank of temporary lieutenant in August 1916. He was transferred to the Royal Flying Corps in November 1916, as an observer with the rank of flying officer. He was promoted to the rank of captain in September 1918, by which point the Royal Flying Corps had been amalgamated into th newly formed Royal Air Force, along with the Royal Naval Air Service.

He remained in the Royal Air Force into the 1940s, serving during the Second World War, during which he retired in March 1945, retaining the rank of group captain.

=== Cricket career ===
Following the war, he made one appearance in first-class cricket for the Combined Services cricket team against Essex at Leyton in 1921. Batting twice in the match, Thornton scored 21 runs in the Combined Services first-innings, before being dismissed by Joseph Dixon, while in their second-innings he was dismissed by the same bowler for 38 runs.

== Personal life ==
In 1922, Thornton married Marjorie Gabriel Pike, daughter of W. R. Pike; they had three sons - Edward Peter, Christopher, and David - and a daughter, (Marjorie) Jean, who married Royal Navy lieutenant Ralph Carnac Baker Stallard-Penoyre (1913-1943), of a landed gentry family of Herefordshire. He was killed in the explosion of HMS Dasher (D37), and is memorialised at Ardrossan.

Thornton died at Stockport in October 1970.
