= Edward Thornton, 1st Count of Cacilhas =

British diplomat (1766–1852)

His Excellency The Right Honourable The Count of Cacilhas GCB FRS
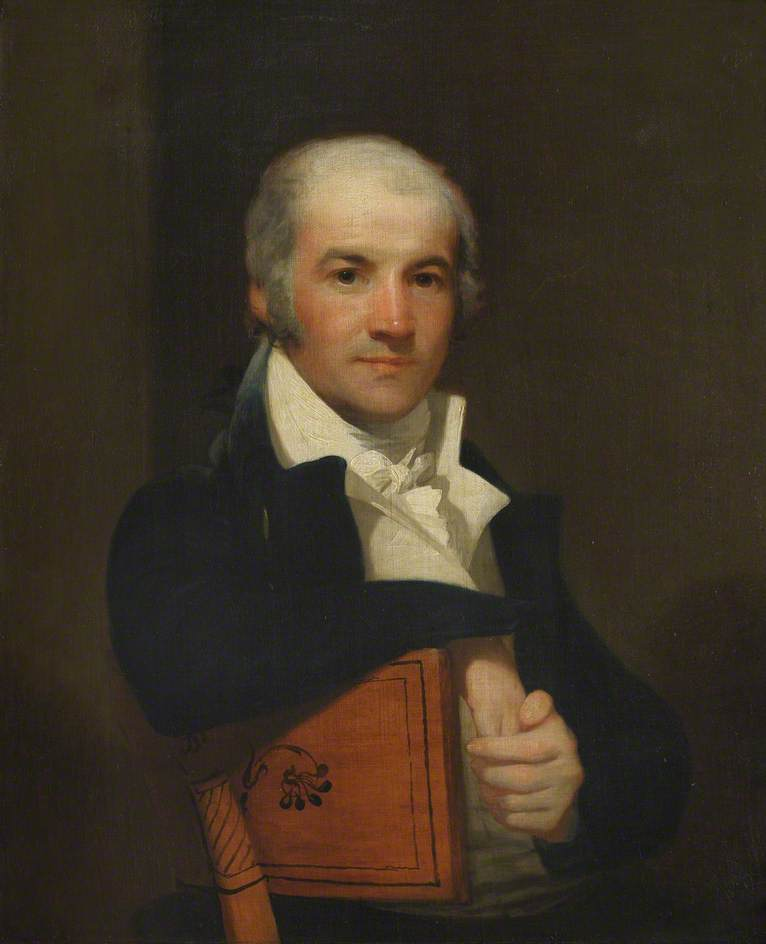
- Sir Edward Thornton, c. 1799, by Gilbert Stuart

Envoy Extraordinary and Minister Plenipotentiary to the Court of Portugal
- In office 1823–1824
- Preceded by: Edward Michael Ward
- Succeeded by: Sir William à Court
- In office 1817–1820
- Preceded by: Thomas Sydenham
- Succeeded by: Edward Michael Ward

Envoy Extraordinary and Minister Plenipotentiary at the Court of Stockholm
- In office 1812–1817
- Preceded by: Diplomatic relations severed due to Sweden's alliance with France
- Succeeded by: Viscount Strangford
- In office 1807–1808
- Preceded by: Hon. Henry Pierrepont
- Succeeded by: Anthony Merry

Envoy Extraordinary and Minister Plenipotentiary to the United States
- In office 1800–1804
- Preceded by: Sir Robert Liston
- Succeeded by: Anthony Merry

Personal details
- Born: Edward Thornton; 22 October 1766 London, England
- Died: 3 July 1852 (aged 85) Plymouth, England
- Spouse: Wilhelmina Kohp (after 1812)
- Relations: Thomas Thornton (brother)
- Children: 7
- Education: Christ's Hospital
- Alma mater: Pembroke College, Cambridge
- Occupation: Diplomat

Sir Edward Thornton, 1st Count of Cacilhas, GCB, PC, FRS (22 October 1766 – 3 July 1852) was a British diplomat, and father of fellow diplomat, Sir Edward Thornton.

== Early life ==
He was born in London, the third of three sons and two daughters, of William Thornton (1738–1769), and Dorothy (née Thompson) Thornton (d. 1769). His father, who was originally from Hull, East Yorkshire, established himself in London as a prosperous innkeeper and Freeman of the City of London. His mother, as later described by Sir Edward, was "a countrywoman... a native of the... East Riding, of a very respectable family". Dorothy died three months after the birth of a daughter, and eight months later, William was suddenly taken ill and died soon after, leaving their children orphaned.

Among his siblings was the merchant Thomas Thornton. Being left in the care of a family friend, using his guardian's connections Thornton was educated at Christ's Hospital and at Pembroke College, Cambridge.

== Career ==
He became British vice-consul in Maryland in June 1793 and then served as Envoy Extraordinary and Minister Plenipotentiary to the United States from 1800 to 1804. After holding various diplomatic posts in Hamburg and the Hanse Towns, he was then posted to Sweden as Minister-Plenipotentiary in December 1807 with the objective of forming an alliance against Napoleon, returning to England in November 1808. In October 1811 he went again to Sweden (until 1817) on a special mission in HMS Victory and he successfully negotiated treaties of alliance with both Sweden and Russia, both called the Treaty of Örebro. This was the first stage in the creation of an alliance of Northern European States against Napoleon. He negotiated the Treaty of Kiel for the United Kingdom and was present with the prince royal of Sweden (Jean Baptiste Bernadotte) when the allies entered Paris in 1815.

He became a member of the Privy council in 1816. He was appointed minister to Portugal in July 1817 and joined the Portuguese court in Brazil. He was ambassador to Portugal from April 1819 to March 1821, when he returned to England. He returned again to Portugal as an ambassador from August 1823 to August 1824 during which time he invested the King of Portugal with the Order of the Garter and assisted the King during the insurrection. The title of Count of Cacilhas in the Portuguese nobility was conferred on Thornton and his heirs, for three generations, by the King of Portugal.

He was elected a Fellow of the Royal Society in June 1810, appointed GCB in 1822 and retired in August 1824.

== Personal life ==
In 1812, Thornton married Magdalena Wilhelmina Amalia Kohp of Hanover, a daughter of Joannes Michael Kopf and Caecilia (née Roth) Kohp. Together, they had one daughter and six sons, including:

- Edward Thornton, 2nd Count of Cacilhas (1817–1906), who married Mary Jane Maitland, a daughter of John Maitland.
- George Reginald Thornton (c. 1819–1841), a graduate of Pembroke College, Cambridge.
- Maria Amalia Thornton (1819–1915), who married Signor Giovanni Tassinari of Tuscany in 1844.

In retirement he lived in Wembury House, Plymouth, Devon, where he died in 1852. His wife predeceased him, at Wembury, in January 1832.

=== Honours and legacy ===
In 1902, his alma mater, Christ's Hospital, named one of its boarding houses after him.

Diplomatic posts
Preceded by Thomas Sydenham	Envoy Extraordinary and Minister Plenipotentiary to the Court of Portugal; 1817–1820	Succeeded by Edward Michael Ward
Preceded by Edward Michael Ward	Envoy Extraordinary and Minister Plenipotentiary to the Court of Portugal; 1823–1824	Succeeded by Sir William à Court
