= Welsh Salmon and Trout Angling Association =

Governing body of game angling in Wales

The Welsh Salmon and Trout Angling Association (Welsh: Cymdeithas Genweirwyr Eog a Brithyll Cymru) (WSTAA) is the governing body for game angling in Wales. It has about one hundred member clubs. Founded as the Welsh Fly Fishing Association (Cymdeithas Pysgota Pluen Cymru) in 1952, the WSTAA organises national and international angling competitions, including two major World Fly Fishing Championships and the 2002 Commonwealth championship in Wales—the WSTAA Wales team won gold at the 2009 IFFA River International competition. The WSTAA also highlights issues that affect Welsh anglers including: game fishing conservation; threats to water quality from acid rain; water pollution; barrages; poaching; stocking; and 'Objective One' funding.

The Welsh Salmon and Trout Angling Association is based in Waunfawr, Aberystwyth, Ceredigion.

== See also ==
- Federation of Welsh Anglers
- Welsh Federation of Coarse Anglers
- Welsh Federation of Sea Anglers
