= Roger Hervey =

British diplomat

Sir Roger Blaise Ramsay Hervey, KCVO, CMG (born 1934) is a retired British diplomat.

He entered HM Diplomatic Service in 1958 and went on to serve as First Secretary at the British Embassy in Colombia (1974–75) before he was appointed Counsellor firstly at the Foreign and Commonwealth Office in 1976, then at the British Embassy in the Netherlands in 1979; after three years there, he was posted to Spain as Minister in Madrid, before serving as Vice-Marshal of the Diplomatic Corps from 1986 to 1991. He was then the British Ambassador to Mexico from 1992 to 1994. Hervey was appointed a Companion of the Order of St Michael and St George in the 1980 New Year Honours, and a Knight Commander of the Royal Victorian Order in 1991.
