= HMS Ulysses (1779) =

Fifth-rate of the Royal Navy

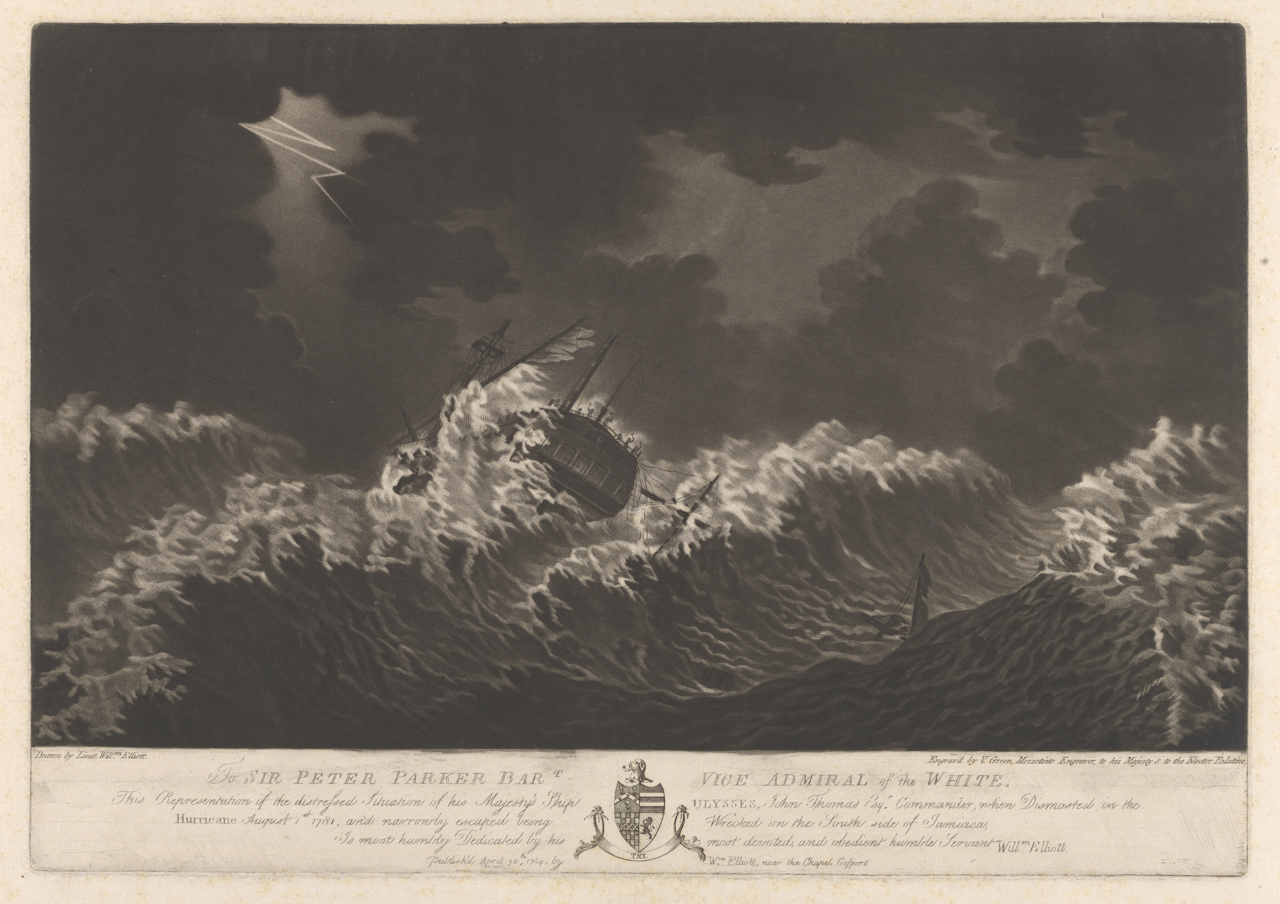
- Distressed Situation of Ulysses - when dismasted in the Hurricane of 1 August 1781, and narrowly escaping being wrecked on the south side of Jamaica

History

Great Britain
- Name: HMS Ulysses
- Ordered: 16 April 1777
- Builder: John Fisher, Liverpool
- Laid down: 28 June 1777
- Launched: 14 July 1779
- Completed: Fit-out at builder by 9 October 1779; Guns and crew at Plymouth Dockyard by 2 January 1780
- Commissioned: May 1779
- In service: 1780–1783; 1790, 1791; 1793–1794; 1795–1802; 1802–1804; 1807–1815
- Fate: Sold at Sheerness Dockyard, 1815

General characteristics
- Class & type: 44-gun Roebuck-class fifth-rate
- Tons burthen: 887 8/94 bm
- Length: 140 ft 0 in (42.7 m) (gundeck); 115 ft 3 in (35.1 m) (keel)
- Beam: 38 ft 0 in (11.6 m)
- Depth of hold: 16 ft 4.75 in (5.00 m)
- Sail plan: Full-rigged ship
- Complement: 280 (320 from 1783)
- Armament: 44 guns comprising: Upper deck: 22 × 9-pounder guns; Lower deck: 20 × 18-pounder guns; Forecastle: 2 × 6-pounder guns

HMS Ulysses was a 44-gun Roebuck-class fifth-rate ship of the Royal Navy during the American Revolutionary War and the Napoleonic Wars. Commissioned in 1779, her principal active service was in the Caribbean, interspersed with periods as a troopship and storeship. She was decommissioned and sold at Sheerness Dockyard in 1815.

== Career ==
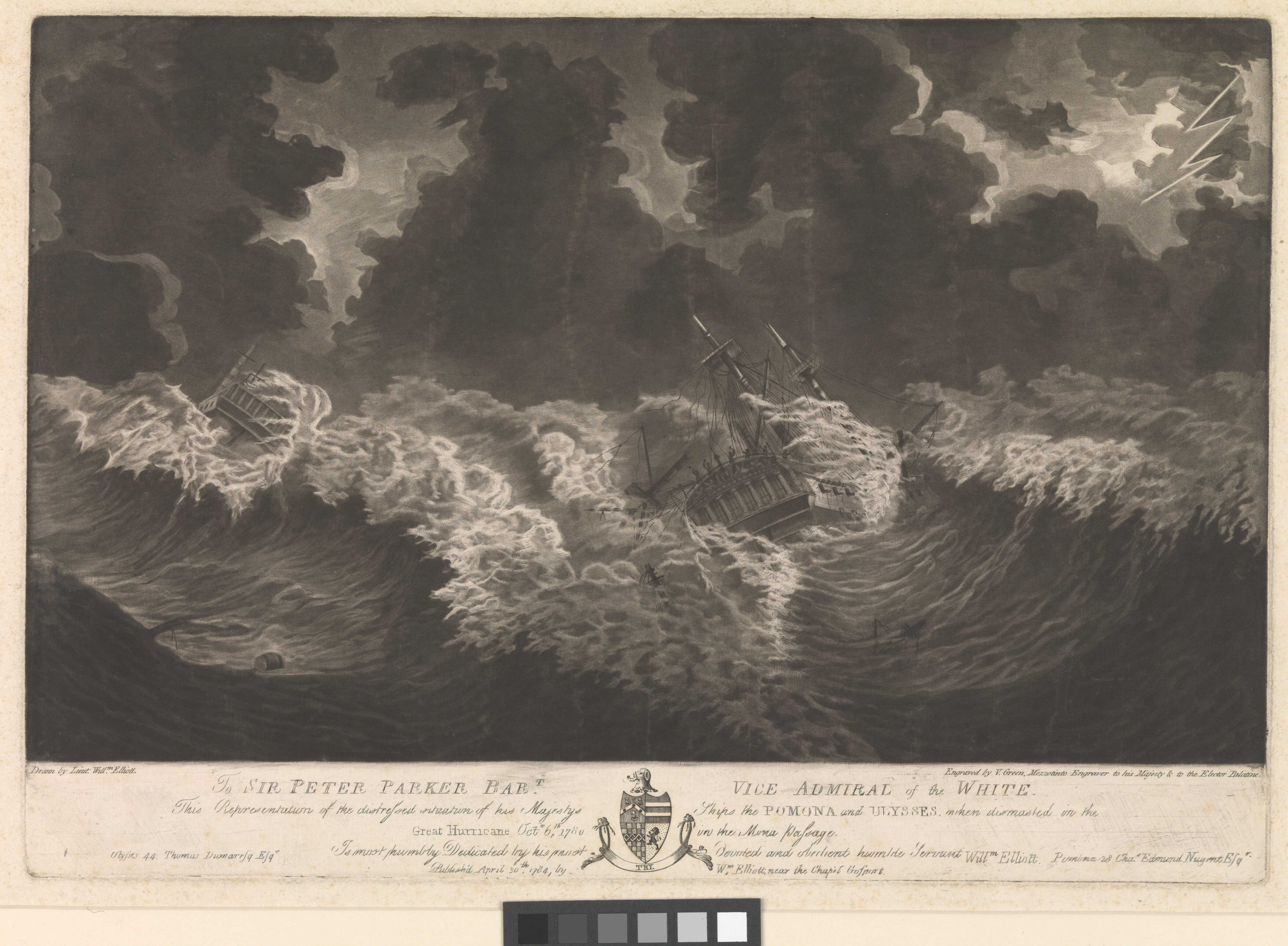
Pomona and Ulysses when dismasted in the Great Hurricane on 6 October 1780 in the Mona Passage

On 2 June 1781, Ulysses encountered the 32-gun Fée, under Captain de Boubée. The ships broke contact after a brief battle.

On 5 June, Ulysses chased the 32-gun Surveillante, under Jean-Marie de Villeneuve Cillart, off Saint-Domingue. Around 2130, Ulysses caught up with Surveillante, and a 2-hour and a half-battle ensued, after which the ships broke contact.
