= Edward Thornton, 2nd Count of Cacilhas =

British diplomat (1817–1906)

The Right Honourable The Count of Cacilhas GCB
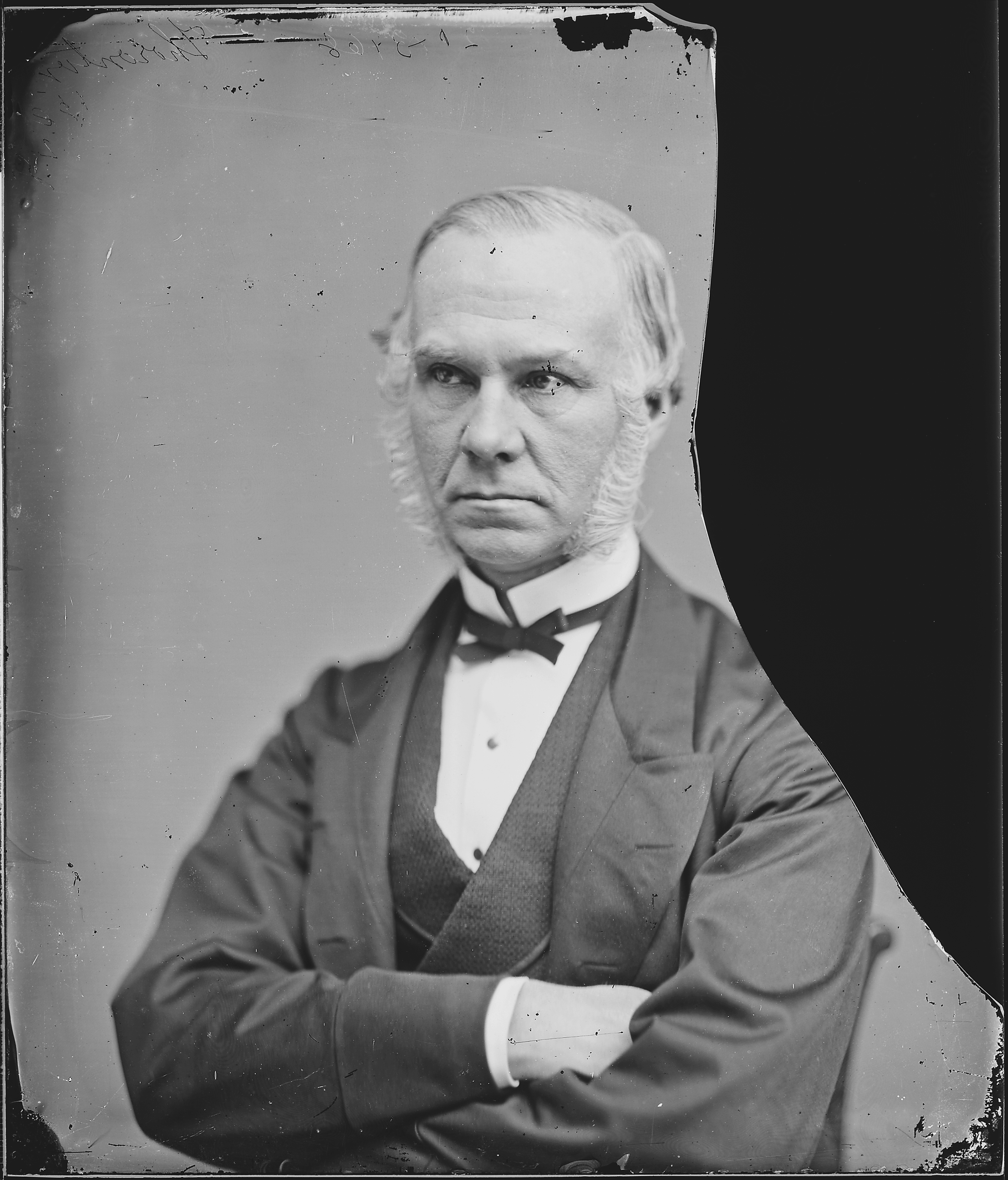
- Thornton, c. 1860–1865

British Ambassador to the Russian Empire
- In office 1881–1884
- Preceded by: The Earl of Dufferin
- Succeeded by: Sir Robert Morier

British Envoy Extraordinary and Minister Plenipotentiary to the United States
- In office 1867–1881
- Preceded by: Sir Frederick Bruce
- Succeeded by: Lionel Sackville-West

British Envoy Extraordinary and Minister Plenipotentiary to the Emperor of Brazil
- In office 1865–1867
- Preceded by: William Dougal Christie
- Succeeded by: George Buckley-Mathew

British Minister Plenipotentiary to the Argentine Confederation
- In office 1859–1865
- Preceded by: William Dougal Christie
- Succeeded by: George Buckley-Mathew (as Minister to the Argentine Republic)

Personal details
- Born: Edward Thornton; 13 July 1817 London
- Died: 26 January 1906 (aged 88) London
- Relations: Edward Thornton (grandson)
- Parent(s): Edward Thornton, 1st Count of Cacilhas; Wilhelmina Kohp
- Education: King's College London
- Alma mater: Pembroke College, Cambridge

Sir Edward Thornton, 2nd Count of Cacilhas, GCB, PC (13 July 1817 – 26 January 1906) was a British diplomat who held posts in Latin America, the Ottoman Empire, the Russian Empire, and served for fourteen years as Minister to the United States.

== Early life ==
Thornton was born in London on 13 July 1817. He was the eldest son of Sir Edward Thornton, 1st Count of Cacilhas, also a diplomat, who for many years held the post of British Minister to Portugal.

Thornton was educated at King's College London, and at Pembroke College, Cambridge.

== Career ==
He entered the diplomatic service as attaché to the mission at Turin in the Kingdom of Sardinia in 1842, filled the same position in Mexico in 1845, and was made Secretary of Legation in that capital in 1853. Thornton did much to forward the conclusion of the Treaty of Guadalupe Hidalgo in 1848.

On his father's death in 1852, Thornton became 2nd Count of Cacilhas (also "Cassilhas"). Also in 1852, he was appointed Secretary of Legation at Buenos Aires, and chargé d'affaires to Uruguay in 1854. He was appointed Minister to the Argentine Republic in 1859, and to the Empire of Brazil in 1865.

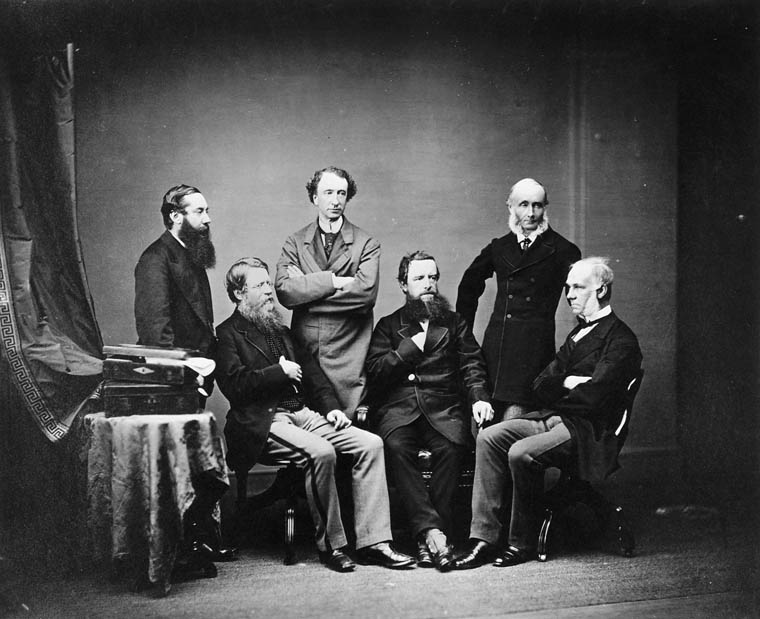
British High Commissioners for the 1871 Treaty of Washington Sir Edward Thornton seated to the right.

Thornton's diplomacy was praised in a House of Commons debate on the Christie Question, William "Seymour" Vesey-FitzGerald calling him "a gentleman who knows how to conciliate... [he knows] that it is not his duty to 'read lessons' to foreign Governments", his behaviour being contrasted with that of William Dougal Christie, British consul in Brazil.

After the war scare with Brazil was averted, another major geopolitical conflict embroiled South America – the Paraguayan War. Brazil, Argentina and Uruguay signed the Treaty of the Triple Alliance, which united all three nations against Paraguay. According to British historian Pelham H. Box, Argentine foreign minister Rufino de Elizalde informed Thornton that the Argentine government had no wish to annex Paraguay, but hoped that in the long term Paraguay might voluntarily join the Argentine Confederation (as was contemplated by Article 13 of the Argentine Constitution). He also informed Thornton that the Argentine Congress feared the provisions in the Treaty might prevent such an occurrence. After the war concluded, Thornton was withdrawn from his position, having concluded several agreements during his tenure.

=== Minister to the United States ===
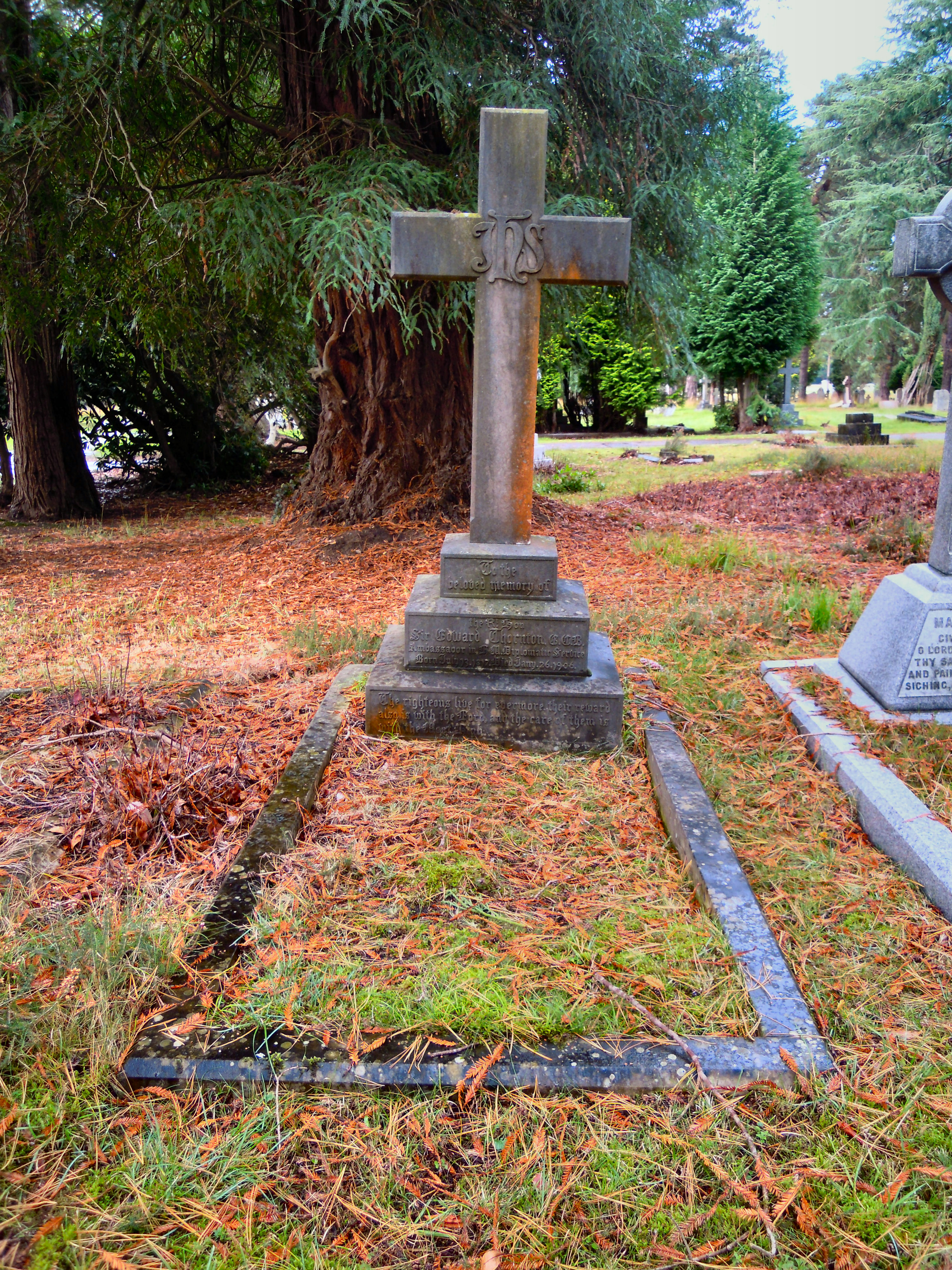
Thornton's grave in Brookwood Cemetery

Thornton's lengthiest assignment was as Minister to the United States, a position he held for fourteen years (1867–1881). In 1871, Thornton served as a member of the commission on the Alabama Claims, and was appointed Privy Councilor. Thornton served in 1873 as an arbitrator in the commission on the Mexican and United States Claims.

=== Ambassador to St Petersburg ===
In 1881, he was appointed Ambassador at St. Petersburg. For his services Thornton was invested Knight Grand Cross of the Order of the Bath in 1883. A year later Thornton received his last appointment, Ambassador at Constantinople, a position he held for three years before retiring "on a pension" in 1887.

== Company Directorships ==
Subsequent to his retirement from the diplomatic service, Thornton was able to supplement his pension income by accepting various offers of company directorships and like offices. In March 1887, the prospectus for The Buenos Ayres Harbour Works Trust named him as one of the three trustees of that entity. This prospectus offered £800,000 in trust certificates bearing interest at 6% p.a.to provide a form of bridging finance to the British contractor responsible for the construction of the major new Harbour Works (Thomas Andrew Walker) - to cover the gap between Walker presenting certificates for work completed and the Argentine government paying for the work under the terms of the contract. Also in March 1887, the prospectus for The Hotchkiss Ordnance Company Limited cited him as the chairman of that company. And in July 1887 the prospectus for The North-Eastern of Uruguay Railway Company Limited cited him as chairman of that company.

In April 1888, the prospectus for The River Plate and General Investment Trust Company Limited cited Thornton as one of the five trustees of that company. In June 1888 the prospectus for the Paraguay Land Company Limited cited him as the chairman of that company. In January 1889 the prospectus for The Vaal River Diamond Company Limited cited him as chairman of that company. In March 1889 the prospectus for The Nordenham Dock and Warehouse Company Limited cited him as the chairman of that company. In April 1889 the prospectus for The Paraguayan Central Railway Company Limited cited him as a director of that company. In November 1889 the prospectus for The Anglo-Italian Inland Steam Navigation Company Limited cited him as the chairman of that company. In March 1890 the prospectus for The Empire of India Corporation Limited cited him as a director of that company. In February 1891 the prospectus for Woodhouse and Rawson United Limited cited him as a director of that company.

There then appears to have been a pause in the pace at which Thornton allowed his name to be used in the promotion of new public companies. But in the second half of the 1890s, a further wave of prospectuses appeared which named him either as company chairman or as a director, including those for The Globe Venture Syndicate Limited (January 1897), and The Gutta Percha Corporation Limited (December 1897). In both of these cases it was James Aratoon Malcolm who recruited Thornton to be company chairman. When an aggrieved subscriber to The Globe Venture Syndicate float took legal action arguing that there were fraudulent misrepresentations in the prospectus, Thornton was required to undergo cross-examination in the Chancery Division of the High Court. During the course of his testimony he stated that he had been a director of "some 14 companies, some of which had been unsuccessful, and were now in liquidation". The following day Thornton`s counsel informed the court that "after the evidence which had been given, he did not think he could resist judgment against Sir Edward Thornton for £2000 ..." In June 1900 a winding-up order was made against the Globe Venture Syndicate, and in February 1901 a public inquiry was held in the London Bankruptcy Court into the failure of the company.

== Personal life ==
In 1854, Thornton married Mary Jane (née Maitland) Melville (1827–1907), at St Peter's Church, Eaton Square. Mary, the widow of Andrew Melville of Dumfries and a daughter of John Maitland and Frances MacKenzie (née Dalyell) Maitland. Together, they were the parents of:

- Edward Thornton (1856–1904), who married Emma Jessie Rawson, the younger daughter of Philip Rawson of Woodhurst, Crawley, in 1889. After his death, she married the Rev. Edward Douglas Lennox Harvey and became the mother of Capt. Roger Harvey.
- Mary Grace Thornton (1858–1926), who died unmarried.
- Frances Evelyn Thornton (1859–1936), who married Mr. Elsey.

After a lengthy illness, Thornton died at his London residence, 5 Tedworth Square, on 26 January 1906. He is buried in Brookwood Cemetery. As his son and heir, diplomat Edward Thornton (born 1856), had died in 1904, the title of Count of Cacilhas passed to his grandson, Edward Thornton.

Diplomatic posts
| Preceded by Sir Frederick Bruce | British Minister to the United States; 1867–1881 | Succeeded by Lionel Sackville-West |
