= Featherstone (disambiguation) =

Featherstone is a town in West Yorkshire, England.

Featherstone may also refer to:

== Places ==
=== United Kingdom ===
- Featherstone, Northumberland, a village
  - Featherstone Castle
- Featherstone, Staffordshire, a village
  - HM Prison Featherstone

=== United States ===
- Featherstone Township, Minnesota
- Featherstone, Virginia

=== Other places ===
- Featherstone, Zimbabwe

== Sports clubs ==
- Featherstone Rovers, professional rugby league club from Featherstone, West Yorkshire
- Featherstone Lions, amateur rugby league club from Featherstone, West Yorkshire

== People ==
- Featherstone (surname), people with the surname

== Other uses ==
- Featherstone (rock band)
- Featherstone High School, Southall, London, England
- Featherstone Education, an imprint of Bloomsbury Publishing
- Featherstone's algorithm, a technique used for computing the effects of forces applied to a structure of joints and links
- Featherstones, former department store business based in Medway and Kent

== See also ==
- Featherston
