= Henry Fanshawe (1634–1685) =

English politician

Henry Fanshawe (1634–1685) was an English politician.

Fanshawe was the third son of Sir Thomas Fanshawe (later 1st Viscount Fanshawe) by his second wife. His brothers were Thomas Fanshawe, 2nd Viscount Fanshawe, Charles Fanshawe, 4th Viscount Fanshawe and Simon Fanshawe, 5th Viscount Fanshawe. He matriculated to his grandfather's alma mater, Jesus College, Cambridge, and afterwards entered the Middle Temple.

Besides being the King's Remembrancer, Fanshawe held other offices of state such as Commissioner for Excise, Receiver of Fines, and Auditor of the Excise. He would later briefly sit as Member of Parliament for Penryn from May 1685 until his death in August 1685.

Parliament of England
Preceded by Charles Smythe; Sir Nicholas Slanning, Bt	Member of Parliament for Penryn; 1685; With: Sir Nicholas Slanning, Bt	Succeeded by Anthony Rowe; Alexander Pendarves
