= Richard Fanshawe =

Richard Fanshawe may refer to:

- Sir Richard Fanshawe, 1st Baronet (1608–1666), English diplomat, translator, and poet
- Richard Fanshawe (equestrian) (1906–1988), British Olympic horse rider
- Sir Richard Fanshawe, 2nd Baronet (1665–1694), of the Fanshawe baronets

== See also ==
- Fanshawe (surname)
