= Katherine Ferrers =

English gentlewoman and alleged bandit (1634–60)

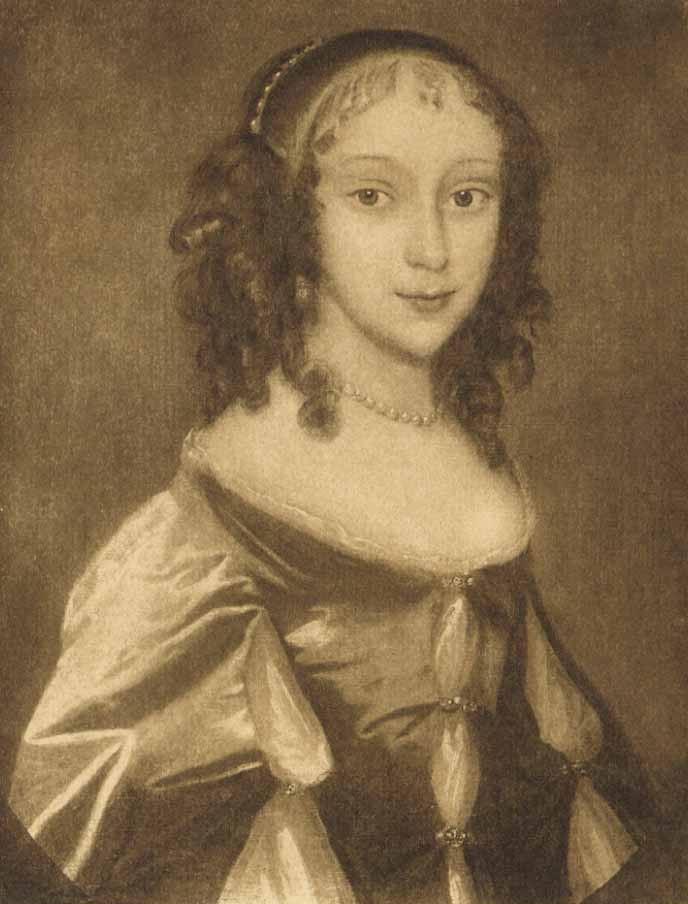
- The only extant portrait of Katherine Ferrers, supposedly at the age of 14, which now sits at the Valence House Museum.
- Born: 4 May 1634; Bayford, Hertfordshire, England
- Died: 13 June 1660 (aged 26); England
- Resting place: St Mary's Church, Ware
- Other names: Mistress Catherine Fanshawe, "Wicked Lady" (alleged)
- Occupations: Gentlewoman, highwayman (alleged)
- Spouse: Thomas Fanshawe
- Parent(s): Knighton Ferrers and Katherine (or Catherine) Walters

Katherine Ferrers (4 May 1634 – c. 13 June 1660) was an English gentlewoman and heiress. According to popular legend, she was also the "Wicked Lady", a highwaywoman who terrorised the English county of Hertfordshire before dying from gunshot wounds sustained during a robbery.

== History ==
Katherine Ferrers was born on 4 May 1634 at Bayford in Hertfordshire to Knighton Ferrers and his wife, the former Katherine (or Catherine) Walters, and heiress to a considerable fortune. The Ferrers family were fervent Protestants and great favourites of both Henry VIII and Edward VI; the latter granted them extensive properties in Hertfordshire, including Bayford, Ponsbourne, Agnells, the family mansion at Flamstead, and the manor house of Markyate Cell at Markyate. Knighton Ferrers died in 1640, and Katherine's grandfather, Sir George Ferrers, died soon after. Katherine's brother, who was the heir to the family fortunes, had died young, so by court decree in October 1640, she was appointed sole heir to her grandfather's estates.

Her widowed mother married Sir Simon Fanshawe later that same year. The Fanshawe family were committed Royalists, and when the Civil War broke out in 1642, Simon, his new wife and stepdaughter joined King Charles I in Oxford, his wartime capital. Her mother died that winter, leaving eight-year-old Katherine in the care of her stepfather. As the fighting continued, Fanshawe was at the Battle of Marston Moor in 1644, and was taken prisoner two years later. During this time Katherine was made a ward of the court by Simon Fanshawe's brother, Richard, and his wife Ann. She was then sent to live with Simon's sister, Alice, at Hamerton in Huntingdonshire.

In 1643 the Sequestration Committee placed estates of known Royalists in the hands of local commissioners, and their rents and other income were kept by Parliament. Unlike Parliament, the Royalist party was dependent on voluntary contributions, involuntary fines and any other means of raising funds, such as looting. The Fanshawes had contributed heavily to the Royalist cause, and now found their assets cut. The family then arranged for orphaned Katherine, heir to the Ferrers estates, to marry Thomas Fanshawe, her stepfather's nephew, when she reached a marriageable age. In April 1648, when she was just shy of 14, the ceremony took place at Hamerton, whereupon her 16-year-old husband took control of her considerable fortune. Many of her inherited assets were quickly disposed of: the manor at Flamstead was sold in 1654; and Markyate Cell, which had been leased to tenants in the years after her father's death, and the farms around it, were disposed of the following year.

After Cromwell's death in 1658, The Protectorate did not endure and the monarchy was eventually restored to power. Thomas Fanshawe had become involved in Booth's uprising, a Presbyterian rebellion in the north of England, and was imprisoned in the Tower of London in September 1659, although he was released in February 1660. Charles II entered London in May; Katherine is known to have lodged in the Strand during the celebration. She then died sometime in the first two weeks of June, at the age of 26. Described in the parish register as “Mistress Catherine Fanshawe", she was buried at St Mary's church in Ware, on 13 June 1660. She died childless; this could have been due to infertility, or to her husband's continued absence due to war and imprisonment.

A family history written by Herbert Fanshawe in 1927, which draws heavily on the memoirs of Ann, Lady Fanshawe, suggested that: "Possibly her death occurred at the birth of a child for the Register of Ayott St. Lawrence (no great distance from Ware), gives the burial, on 22 November in the same year, of "Marie Fanshawe daughter of Sir Thomas Fanshaw"." If this was indeed Katherine's five-month-old child, its birth was not recorded, and its burial entry would have to have been inserted some time after its death, since Thomas was not knighted until well after 1660. A later entry of this type would not have been unusual for the time, as many parish registries were irregularly kept. However, since Katherine's husband was imprisoned in 1659 following the Booth uprising in the north, and not released until February 1660, the issue then becomes one of paternity, since a pregnancy of four months duration, during those times, could not have produced a child that would have survived. While it is "no great distance from Ware" (some 13 miles), the child in question was not still buried in the same location as Katherine.

With Katherine's death the Ferrers line died out; in the following year Thomas Fanshawe, who had been created a Knight of the Bath by Charles II, disposed of the bulk of the Ferrers' family property that had originally been granted to Katherine's ancestors by Edward VI. Described by the diarist Samuel Pepys as "a witty but rascally fellow, without a penny in his purse", Thomas did not marry again until 1665. He had four children by his second wife, Sarah, who was the daughter of Sir John Evelyn and widow of Sir John Wray; the eldest of whom, Evelyn, would become the 3rd Viscount Fanshawe.

== Legend ==
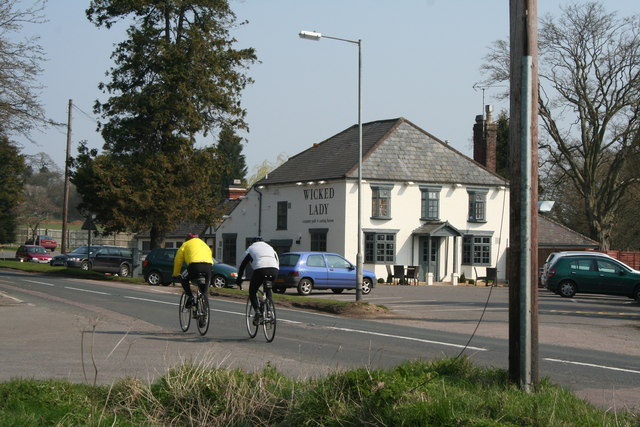
The Wicked Lady pub

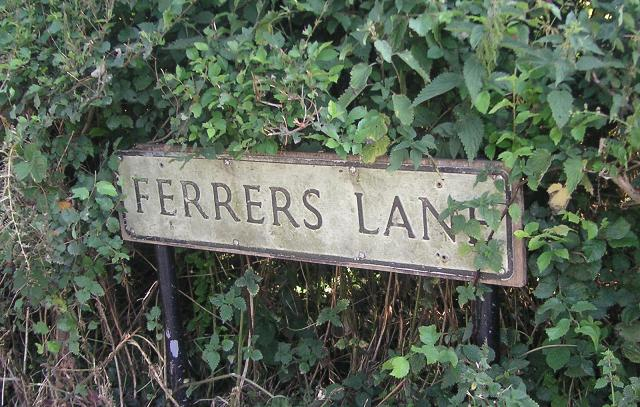
The road bisecting Nomansland Common, presumably named after "Wicked" Katherine Ferrers

According to the popular legend, often told with an emphasis on hauntings by her ghost, Katherine came into highway robbery in her husband's absence in order to redress her fast-dwindling fortune. During this time many highwaymen were Royalist supporters bereft of home, estates or income, who were left to make a living as best they could, so any courteous highway robber was perceived to be one of these well-mannered gentlemen. Not all highwaymen were well-born like French aristocrat Claude Duval or James MacLaine, who was the second son of a minister, but this romanticised portrayal extended to such working-class robbers as MacLaine's partner William Plunkett, as well as Richard Ferguson, George Lyons, Tom King, John Nevison, and John Rann. However, while it is possible that Katherine Ferrers could have turned to highway robbery, there seems to be no historical proof that her accomplice "Ralph Chaplin", ever existed. He was supposedly caught and executed on Finchley Common either on the night of her death, or soon after, which conveniently serves the legend.

The unknown circumstances of Katherine's early death have fuelled speculation. The persistent rumour is that she was shot as a highwayman on Nomansland Common on the edge of Wheathampstead, and died of her wounds while trying to ride back to a secret staircase entry at Markyate Cell. Her body was supposedly discovered wearing men's clothing before her servants recovered it and carried her home to be buried. Markyate Cell was built on the site of a 12th-century Benedictine Priory and takes its name from a cell, or smaller structure, that served the monastery. It was converted at great expense into a manor house in 1540, and then rebuilt in 1908 after a fire. When a secret chamber was discovered by workmen in the 1800s behind a false wall next to a chimney stack, it gave new life to the legend. However, there is a serious inconsistency in this story as there is no record of Katherine ever having lived in Markyate Cell, as it was leased to tenants after her father's death. The property, which is not especially close to Nomansland Common, had actually been sold five years earlier.

Apart from robbery, a catalogue of mayhem in the area was later attributed to Katherine that included burning houses, slaughtering livestock, even killing a constable or other officer of the law. Much of the supposed activity might be blamed on bands of brigands and the unrest relating to the Civil War, and there is no confirmation as to whether the mayhem and robberies in the area ceased with Katherine's death.

J.E. Cussens suggested in his History of Hertfordshire (1870–81) that the term "wicked" came to be linked with Katherine Ferrers long after her death not through any nefarious actions on her part, but through confusion with the "Wicked" Lord Ferrers, who was not related to her. The last member of the House of Lords hanged in England, the "wicked" Laurence Shirley, Earl Ferrers, was executed at Tyburn for the murder of his manservant in 1760, one hundred years after Katherine's death. Cussans notes that there is no contemporary mention of her career and death as a highwayman in histories published before the 4th Earl Ferrers's execution, such as Alexander Smith's Complete History of the Lives of the most Notorious Highwaymen (1714), or even some 60 years after it, such as The Newgate Calendar and Richard Clutterbuck's The History and Antiquities of the County of Hertford (1815–27).

While it has also been proposed that the term "wicked" could have been applied to Katherine solely because she allowed the family estates to fall into ruin, this is unlikely since many Royalist families suffered many of the same reverses without this nomenclature being applied to them. In addition, it was Katherine's husband who controlled, and sold off, most of the Ferrers family assets; as his wife she would have been powerless to stop him.

== Literature, film and stage ==
A popular novel by Magdalen King-Hall, The Life and Death of the Wicked Lady Skelton (1944), was loosely based on Katherine's life. A 1945 film version called The Wicked Lady, with Margaret Lockwood in the lead role and James Mason as Ralph Chaplin's alter ego Jerry Jackson, broke all British box office records for the time. The film was remade in 1983 with Faye Dunaway and Alan Bates in the respective roles. Deborah Swift's young adult novel Shadow on the Highway (2014, ISBN 978-1500549831) is a retelling of Katherine's story. Katherine Clements wrote The Silvered Heart (2015, ISBN 9781472204240) about Katherine Ferrers.

The legend of Katherine Ferrers was the inspiration behind James Williams' new ghost play, The Wicked Lady, premièring in Birmingham in September 2021.
