= Featherstone (surname) =

Featherstone is a surname. Notable people with the surname include:

- Angela Featherstone (born 1965), Canadian actress
- Bower Featherstone (born 1940), Canadian civil servant, spy for the Soviet Union
- Claudius Cyprian Featherstone (1864–1945), American lawyer and judge
- Collis Featherstone (1913–1990), Australian Bahá'í leader
- Donald Featherstone (disambiguation), multiple people
- Harold Featherstone, (1923–2003), American judge and politician
- Jane Featherstone (born 1969), Television Producer
- Jim Featherstone (1923–2014), British rugby league footballer
- James Featherstone (footballer) (born 1979), English footballer
- Kevin Featherstone (born 1971), American professional wrestler
- Lewis P. Featherstone (1851–1922), American planter, farm activist and politician
- Liza Featherstone (born 1969), American journalist
- Lynne Featherstone (born 1951), British politician
- Matthew Featherstone (born 1970), English born Brazilian cricketer
- Mickey Featherstone (born 1949), American mobster
- Mike Featherstone, British academic
- Nicky Featherstone (born 1988), English footballer
- Norman Featherstone (born 1949), South African cricketer
- Reilly Featherstone (born 1998), Welsh Actor
- Simon Featherstone (1958–2014), British diplomat
- Tony Featherstone (1949–2021), Canadian retired professional ice hockey player
- Vicky Featherstone (born 1967), British theatre director and artistic director
- Willie Featherstone (born 1959), Canadian professional boxer

Fictional characters

- Featherstone family in George Eliot's Middlemarch
- Sir Guthrie Featherstone, Queen's Counsel, Head of Chambers, and Judge in John Mortimer's Rumpole of the Bailey
- Mabel Featherstone, protagonist of British childrens show Come Outside

== See also ==
- Featherston
