= Fanshawe =

Fanshawe (less commonly Fanshaw) can refer to:

== Places ==
- Fanshawe, Oklahoma, a town in the United States
- Fanshawe (ward), a former electoral ward in London, England
- Fanshawe College, a school in London, Ontario, Canada
- Fanshawe Dam in London, Ontario
- Fanshawe Lake in London, Ontario
- Fanshawe Pioneer Village in London, Ontario
- Fanshawe Palace, a palace in Warsaw, Poland

== People ==
- Fanshawe (surname)
- Brad Fanshaw

== Other uses ==
- Featherstonhaugh, of the same pronunciation as Fanshawe
- Anthony Royle, Baron Fanshawe of Richmond (1927–2001)
- Fanshawe (novel), a 19th-century novel by Nathaniel Hawthorne
- USS Fanshaw Bay (CVE-70), US navy aircraft carrier
- Viscount Fanshawe
