= List of ambassadors of the Kingdom of England to Portugal =

Ambassador of the Kingdom of England to Portugal
- Coat of Arms of England
- Style: His Excellency
- Residence: Lisbon
- Appointer: The monarch
- Final holder: Sir Paul Methuen

The Ambassador of the Kingdom of England to Portugal was the foremost diplomatic representative of the historic Kingdom of England in Portugal, before the creation of the Kingdom of Great Britain in 1707.

The position was not always a continuous or permanent one, and there was sometimes no diplomatic representation between the two countries.

For ambassadors of the Court of St James's to Portugal after 1707, see List of ambassadors of Great Britain to Portugal.

== Envoys Extraordinary of England to Portugal ==
- 1650: Charles Vane Agent
- 1656: Philip Meadowes Agent
- 1657-1661: Thomas Maynard Agent (also Consul-General until 1689)
- 1661: Sir Richard Fanshaw
- 1661-1662: The Earl of Sandwich
- 1662-1665: Sir Richard Fanshaw
  - 1666-1667: Sir Peter Wyche Special ambassador
- 1665-1669: Sir Robert Southwell Ambassador
- 1669-1680 : Francis Parry Minister; ambassador from 1672
- 1680-1684: Charles Fanshawe
  - 1685: Lord Lansdowne
- 1685-1688: Charles Scarborough
- 1691-1697: John Methuen
  - 1694-1695 and 1696-1697: Paul Methuen, Chargé d'affaires
- 1697-1704: Paul Methuen Minister
- 1702-1706: John Methuen Ambassador
- 1706-1707: Sir Paul Methuen (first British ambassador to Portugal)

== After the Union of England and Scotland ==
In 1707 the Kingdom of England became part of the new Kingdom of Great Britain. For missions from the court of St James's after 1707, see List of ambassadors of Great Britain to Portugal.
