= Capell Bedell =

British politician

Sir Capell Bedell, 1st Baronet (1602 – 14 December 1643) was an English politician.

Bedell was the son of Sir Thomas Bedell, of Hamerton, Huntingdonshire, by Winifred Capell, daughter of Sir Arthur Capell, of Hadham, Hertfordshire. He matriculated into Queens' College, Cambridge as a 16-year-old in 1618. He was created a baronet, of Hamerton in the County of Huntingdon, on 3 June 1622. Bedell later represented Hertford in Parliament in 1626 and Huntingdonshire from 1628 to 1629 and again in 1640. Between 1632 and 1633, he served as High Sheriff of Cambridgeshire and Huntingdonshire.

Bedell married Alice Fanshawe, daughter of Sir Henry Fanshawe. He died in December 1643. As he had no sons the baronetcy died with him. His daughter Mary married Sir Thomas Leventhorpe, 2nd Baronet.

Parliament of England
Preceded by William Ashton; Thomas Fanshawe	Member of Parliament for Hertford; 1626; With: Sir William Harrington	Succeeded by Sir Edward Howard; Sir Thomas Fanshawe
Preceded by Sir Robert Payne; Edward Montagu	Member of Parliament for Huntingdonshire; 1628–1629; With: Sir Robert Payne	Parliament suspended until 1640
Vacant Parliament suspended since 1629	Member of Parliament for Huntingdonshire; 1640; With: Thomas Cotton	Succeeded by Sir Sidney Montagu; Valentine Walton
Baronetage of England
New creation	Baronet (of Hamerton); 1622–1643	Extinct
