= James Featherstone =

James Featherstone may refer to:

- Jim Featherstone (1923–2014), English rugby league footballer who played in the 1940s and 1950s
- James Featherstone (footballer) (born 1979), English footballer
