= Paul Methuen (diplomat) =

British politician and diplomat (1672–1757)

Sir Paul Methuen
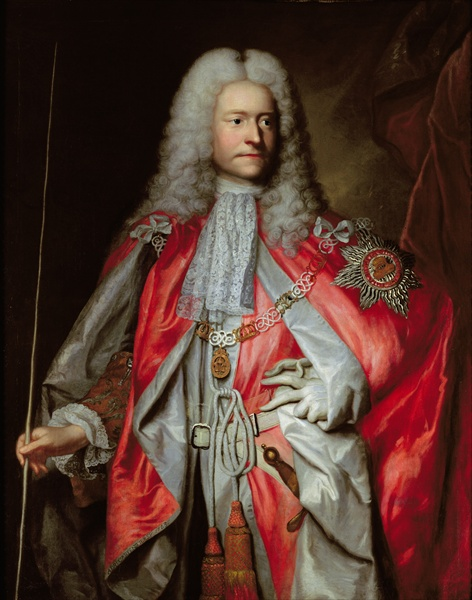
- Portrait by Adrien Carpentiers, c. 1760

Ambassador of the Kingdom of England to Portugal
- In office 1706 – 1708 (as Ambassador of Great Britain to Portugal)
- Monarch: Anne, Queen of Great Britain
- Preceded by: John Methuen
- Succeeded by: Henri de Massue, Earl of Galway

Personal details
- Born: c. 1672 Bradford-upon-Avon, Wiltshire
- Died: April 11, 1757
- Resting place: Westminster Abbey
- Parent(s): John Methuen; Mary Cheevers

Sir Paul Methuen (c. 1672 – 11 April 1757) was a British Whig politician and diplomat who sat in the House of Commons between 1708 and 1747. He was an envoy to Portugal between 1697 and 1708 and later a holder of public offices, particularly in the Royal household.

== Early life ==
Methuen was born in Bradford-on-Avon, Wiltshire, the son of John Methuen and his wife Mary Cheevers, daughter of Seacole Cheevers (or Chivers). His parents' marriage was unhappy and they separated when he was in his teens. His father inherited the lease of the manor of Bishops Cannings, near Devizes. He was educated privately and then at a Jesuit school in Paris.

== Diplomatic career ==
Methuen went to Lisbon in 1691, when his father was appointed minister there. He gained valuable diplomatic experience and the esteem of Peter II of Portugal. During two absences of his father, he became chargé d'affaires, rising to Minister on his father's appointment as Lord Chancellor of Ireland in 1697. He was unable to prevent a Portuguese-French alliance in 1701. When his father returned to Portugal as a special envoy in 1702, they were successful in breaking the alliance in 1703. That led to the Methuen commercial treaty between England and Portugal, the basis of Britain's monopoly of Portuguese trade for much of the 18th century. His father remained in Portugal as ambassador. In 1705, Methuen served with the army, being present at the capture of Gibraltar. On his return to England to obtain military supplies he was appointed Minister to Savoy, but succeeded his father as ambassador to Portugal on the latter's death in July 1706. While he was in Portugal, the Kingdom of England became the Kingdom of Great Britain following the ratification of the Acts of Union 1707, resulting in Methuen becoming the first ambassador of Great Britain to Portugal.

== Political career ==
Methuen was still abroad when he was elected Whig Member of Parliament (MP) for Devizes at the 1708 general election. He served on three committees, including one on 9 March 1709 to draft a bill to prohibit French wines and other products more effectively, reflecting his mercantile connections and experience in negotiating commercial treaties. Also in 1709, he supported the naturalization of the Palatines. He was appointed as a Lord of the Admiralty in November 1709, and was returned unopposed at the ensuing by-election. At the 1710 general election, he was returned initially at Devizes in a double return but his opponents were declared elected. He asked to be removed from the Board of Admiralty, because he considered himself unsuitable, and refused another public office. At the 1713 general election, he was returned in a contest as MP for Brackley (Northamptonshire) in the interest of the Earl of Bridgwater, but was unseated on petition on 20 April 1714. He was appointed a Lord of the Treasury and was sworn as a Privy Councillor on 29 October 1714. At this stage, he was a member of the Hanover Club.

At the 1715 general election, Methuen was returned unopposed as MP for Brackley. In 1715, he was sent as ambassador to Spain and Morocco to negotiate a commercial treaty, but had to return because of ill health. He became Secretary of State for the Southern Department in 1716 and transported war prisoners from the Scottish Highlands to America. He resigned with Robert Walpole in 1717. When Walpole resumed office in 1720, he became Comptroller of the Royal Household. He appears to have sold the lease of Bishop's Cannings in 1720. At the 1722 election, he was returned unopposed at Brackley and exchanged office in 1725 to become Treasurer of the Household. He was made a Knight of the Bath by George I in May 1725. He was returned as MP for Brackley in the general elections of 1727, 1734 and 1741, but after the death of his patron the Duke of Bridgwater, he was not put forward for Brackley at the 1747 election.

== Death and legacy ==
Methuen died, unmarried, in 1757, and was buried in the south aisle of Westminster Abbey, near his father John. His only brother Henry had been killed in a brawl in Lisbon in 1694. His heir was his cousin Paul Methuen, for whom he bought Corsham Court; that Paul's grandson was created Baron Methuen.

Methuen is the namesake of the town of Methuen, Massachusetts.

His bust by Peter Scheemakers is in the family home of Corsham Court in Wiltshire.

== Notes ==
Diplomatic posts
Preceded by John Methuen	English Minister to Portugal; 1697–1702	Succeeded by John Methuen as ambassador
Preceded by ?	English Minister to Savoy; 1705–1706	Succeeded by John Chetwynd
Preceded by John Methuen	British Minister to Portugal; 1706–1708	Succeeded by ?
Parliament of Great Britain
Preceded by Josiah Diston and Sir Francis Child	Member of Parliament for Devizes; 1708–1710; With: Josiah Diston	Succeeded by Sir Francis Child and Thomas Richmond Webb
Preceded by William Egerton and John Burgh	Member of Parliament for Brackley; 1713–1714; With: William Egerton	Succeeded by John Burgh and Henry Watkins
Preceded by John Burgh and Henry Watkins	Member of Parliament for Brackley; 1715–1747; With: William Egerton, to 1733; George Lee, 1733–1742; Sewallis Shirley, from 1742	Succeeded by Sewallis Shirley and Richard Lyttelton
Political offices
Preceded by James Stanhope	Secretary of State for the Southern Department; 1716–1717	Succeeded by Joseph Addison
Preceded by Hugh Boscawen	Comptroller of the Household; 1720–1725	Succeeded by Daniel Finch, Lord Finch
Preceded by The Earl of Cholmondeley	Treasurer of the Household; 1725–1730	Succeeded by The Lord Bingley
Honorary titles
Preceded by Sir James Lowther, Bt	Senior Privy Counsellor; 1755–1757	Succeeded by The Duke of Dorset
