= List of ambassadors of Great Britain to Portugal =

Ambassador of Great Britain to Portugal
- Arms of Great Britain
- Style: His Excellency
- Residence: Lisbon
- Appointer: The monarch
- Inaugural holder: Sir Paul Methuen; First Ambassador of Great Britain to Portugal
- Final holder: John Hookham Frere; Last Ambassador of Great Britain to Portugal (Chargé d'Affaires)

The ambassador of Great Britain to Portugal was the foremost diplomatic representative of the Kingdom of Great Britain in Portugal, which was established by the Treaty of Union in 1707. The ambassador was in charge of the British diplomatic mission.

For ambassadors from the Court of St James to Portugal before 1707, see the list of ambassadors of the Kingdom of England to Portugal. For ambassadors after 1800, see the list of ambassadors from the United Kingdom to Portugal.

== Heads of mission ==
- 1707–1708: Sir Paul Methuen (last English ambassador to Portugal)
- 1708–1710: Henri de Massue, Earl of Galway
- 1709–1710: Thomas Leffever Chargé d'affaires in absence of Galway>
- 1710–1714 George Delaval
- 1714–1722: Henry Worsley
- 1722–1724: Hon. Thomas Lumley
- 1725–1728: Brigadier James Dormer
- 1728: Charles Crompton Chargé d'affaires
- 1728–1742: Lord Tyrawley
- 1742–1745: Charles Crompton (Chargé d'affaires from 1741)
- 1745: Abraham Castres Chargé d'affaires
- 1745–1749: Sir Benjamin Keene
- 1749–1757: Abraham Castres
- 1757–1767: Hon. Edward Hay
  - 1760: Thomas Hay, 9th Earl of Kinnoull Special Mission
  - 1762: Lord Tyrawley Envoy Plenipotentiary
- 1767–1770: William Henry Lyttelton (created Lord Westcote in 1776 and Lord Lyttelton in 1794): Envoy-extraordinary and Plenipotentiary
- 1771–1800: Hon. Robert Walpole Envoy Extraordinary and Plenipotentiary
  - 1786: William Fawkener (jointly with Walpole) for negotiating commercial affairs
- 1800: John Hookham Frere (first United Kingdom ambassador to Portugal)
