= Western Rising and disafforestation riots =

Series of riots in the Gillingham Forest from 1626-1632

The Western Rising was a series of riots which took place during 1626–1632 in Gillingham Forest on the Wiltshire-Dorset border, Braydon Forest in Wiltshire, and the Forest of Dean, Gloucestershire in response to disafforestation of royal forests, sale of royal lands and enclosure of property by the new owners. Disafforestation is a change in legal status that allows the land to be sold normally, rather than being preserved as a forest. Enclosure takes the land out of common use, denying access to non-owners who had previously used it.

There were contemporaneous uprisings in Feckenham Forest and Leicester Forest. Riots also took place at Malvern Chase, where enclosure was largely successfully opposed.

Riot and breaching enclosures were not the only form of opposition to disafforestation. In many cases, landowners and tenants felt the compensation they were offered was unfair, and they sought to challenge decisions through the legal system. In at least one case, a town council, the Corporation of Leicester, and borough residents took legal action because of the effect on the poorest forest dwellers, who were likely to become a burden on the town's poor relief.

The 1626–1632 riots were followed by further riots at many of the same locations during the English Civil War and the following Interregnum as disafforestation proceeded and continued to be contested.

== Origins and causes ==
As early as 1608–1612, King James I of England's minister Robert Cecil investigated the reform of Royal forests, aiming to increase the income due to the Crown. Cecil's investigations led to more intensive working of the Forest of Dean, and higher revenues from wood sold for iron smelting. Lionel Cranfield accelerated the policy in the 1620s with commissions to determine the scale of the Royal estates within forests and negotiate compensation for their sale and enclosure.

Charles I of England's decision in 1629 to govern without Parliament meant greater urgency in finding further sources of income which did not require legislation. Sale of Royal lands, especially Royal forests, was an obvious means of raising short term funds. The forests were also increasingly seen as insufficiently productive.

However, many people depended on forest lands for income. As forest law had for many years not been enforced except as a means to raise income, land had been encroached and many people were living there without permission. Timber and grazing rights were very important for commoners. The rights to common had been created through custom rather than legal entitlement: forest law itself was extremely harsh.

== Participants and organisation ==
The participants of the disorders following enclosure tended to be artisans and waged or self-employed labourers. Many were therefore resident within the forest with small holdings, rather than being peasants primarily dependent on agricultural production. In the Forest of Dean, many were miners whose rights to dig for ore were threatened. Contemporaries within government suspected local men of standing, such as the landowning gentry, of being behind the riots, and looked for evidence that they were involved in their organisation.

Although the term 'Western Rising' implies an organised effort across the different threatened Royal forests, there is only occasional evidence that the different communities communicated or tried to co-ordinate their activities. Nevertheless, many tactics were shared, including the use of traditional "Lady Skimmington" costume and parades to show community disapproval and organise action to break down enclosures. In arrest warrants, leaders were often identified as "alias Skimmington".

== The Western Rising ==
=== Gillingham ===
The first riots were in Gillingham Forest, Dorset. Commissions headed by Sir James Fullerton were sent in February and May 1625, to work out compensation for freeholders and copyholders in Gillingham and Mere. In order for the settlement to be made legally binding, the Attorney General then brought an action against the tenants in the Court of the Exchequer, which issued the final decree in May 1627, allowing for adjustments to the compensation were made by a commission which finalised arrangements in October. Much of the land was granted to Fullerton in 1625. The terms were renegotiated in 1628 to help him repay debts. Further arrangements were made to ensure these debts were paid from the forest lands in 1630, shortly before his death.

Riots took place through 1626–1628. In December 1626, Star Chamber ordered the attachment (arrest) of fourteen men and twelve of their wives. Seven were brought to trial, and four of the men were fined. in 1628, soldiers destroyed some of the new enclosures, presumably incited to do so by the locals. Further trials at Star Chamber took place. Deer were killed and plants to be used in the new enclosures were burnt. Threats were made against the labourers employed by Fullerton to build the enclosures. Messengers from Star Chamber were assaulted and prisoners released.

The Privy Council took the Gillingham riots very seriously, saying that "such like rude actions [must] not be tolerated in a well governed state". An attempt to restore order was made in late 1628, when the Sheriff of Dorset was instructed to arrest 100 rioters. Faced with a much larger and well-armed crowd, he retreated.

Particular efforts were made by the government to arrest Henry Hoskins, a yeoman, John Phillips, a tanner and John Williams, believing them to be serious ringleaders. However, Sharp concludes that "although these men were important as leaders of riots in their home areas, the government's fears were grounded upon little more than unsubstantiated rumors ... these rumors have misled modern historians into ascribing Hoskins, Phillips and Williams larger roles in the Western Rising than they actually played".

Most of the rioters were artisans, including weavers and tailors. Many would have depended on forest reduce, such as tanners, glove makers and carpenters. They would have been unlikely to be entitled to compensation and so were among the most badly affected by disafforestation.

Around 2,400 acres were sold by the Crown, with 750 acres being set aside to compensate tenants and cottagers. The poor of Mere received little, however.

=== Forest of Dean ===
The object of the Crown was not complete disafforestation in the Forest of Dean, as both timber and iron ore could be exploited for the Crown's profit without leasing the lands. During James I and Charles I's reigns, sales of wood for use in iron works were increased. Some land was enclosed in order for ore to be dug. Around 3,000 acres were however granted to "courtiers and government officials" with the intention that they exploit the lands for grazing, iron and coal mining and charcoal production. 17,000 acres was to be left to be worked by those claiming common land rights.

Riots ensued. In March 1631, the enclosures were destroyed. An assembly of 500 men, "with two drummers, two coulers and one fife in a warlike and outrageous manner did assemble themselves together armed with gunnes, pokes, halberds and other weapons". They destroyed enclosures granted to Tristram Flower in the Snead, then onto lands granted in 1625 to Sir Edward Villiers, the half brother of the Duke of Buckingham. Villier's widow Lady Barbara Villiers's agent Robert Bridges was shot at and threatened, iron ore pits filled in and enclosures broken. An effigy of Lady Villier's agent, the "odious projector" Sir Giles Mompesson was thrown into the pits and buried.

In April 1631, 3,000 rioters with banners and drums removed most of the remaining enclosures elsewhere in the forest and attacked houses of the improvers. By the end of the month, all of the 1628 enclosures had been removed. Over the next two years, the rioters attempted to destroy enclosures as they were put back in place.

=== Braydon ===
On 26 July 1626 Sir John Bridgeman, John Essington (keeper of the king's woods in Wiltshire) and others were given a commission to survey Braydon Forest and compound (settle) with the local freeholders and copyholders. They reported the following year, but the complex land relationships meant that a further commission in 1629 was needed to ensure compensation would be granted to everyone who was entitled to it.

in November 1627, 4,000 acres were granted for 41 years to Phillip Jacobsen, the Crown jeweller, and the London merchant Edward Sewster. They paid £21,000, plus £11,000 as an entry fine, and £10,000 for game and timber and an ironworks licence. A further annual rent of £450 was to be paid They were permitted to enclose the lands and lease them to new tenants.

As with Gillingham, the next step was to establish the precise settlement and rights through actions at the Court of Exchequer, which confirmed the settlement in 1628 and 1630.

Riots broke out in May–June 1631 when enclosures made by Jacobsen's agent Simon Keble were destroyed. Groups of perhaps over 1,000 rioters also threatened to kill Keble and destroy his workmen's houses. At least one was destroyed, belonging to a servant who had reported some of the rioters to the authorities. When the sheriff and a court official attempted to suppress the riots on behalf of Star Chamber, the crowds shot at them.

== Other forest riots ==
As Feckenham, Leicester and Malvern were further afield, disafforestation riots in these places were not classed as part of the Western Rising by contemporaries, but took place at the same time for roughly the same reasons.

=== Feckenham ===
Considerable pressure on the wooded areas was the result of the use of timber to fuel salt pans in Droitwich, a practice that had been recorded as far back as the Domesday Book. Demand for salt increased as the population grew. Much of the forest that had therefore been cut was being farmed by the time the forest was abolished in 1629.

Sir Miles Fleetwood was charged with surveying the lands before the disafforestation. The response of the inhabitants was to refuse to accept their allocation of common land, on the grounds that they had only agreed to them by "for fear and by terrible threats" and that their allocations did not compensate them for the loss of common rights. Ultimately 155 of them complained to the Court of Exchequer.

Near the end of 1627, William Ashton and William Turnor were let the forest in return for a fine of £4,000 and a nominal annual rent of £20. This was confirmed in June 1629, when the disforestation of the forest was decreed, so that the 2100 acres of woodland and waste in the forest parishes of Hanbury, Feckenham and Bradley could be partitioned between the crown, the manorial lords and the commoners.

A further commission in November 1630 reduced the crown's allocation in Hanbury from 550 to 460 acres, but this was still not accepted locally. The new owners were ordered to enclose their lands by 1 March 1631, but on 28 March, a riot took place in which three miles of fencing were thrown down. 300 people rioted the following year and were met by the Sheriff, a deputy lieutenant and a justice of the peace and forty armed men. The rioters "in a most daring and presumptuous manner presented themselves unto us with warlike weapons (vizt) pikes, forrest bills, pitchforks, swords and the like". On this occasion, the authorities acted to suppress this "flatt rebellion", tried to arrest the rioters and injured a number.

Ultimately, the crown and manorial lords were successful in enclosing their lands. The crown allocation in Hanbury was rapidly sold off. The Lord of Hanbury and Feckenham manors, Sir Edward Leighton gained around 80 acres in Monkwood and 360 acres around Feckenham.

=== Leicester ===
Sir Miles Fleetwood was commissioned to survey and disafforest Leicester in December 1626 and March 1627. Commoners were to receive compensation where they could show a valid claim; many would not be able to, if they had settled of their own accord. The Attorney General then ensured that the arrangements were confirmed by the court of Exchequer in February 1628. The King then let 1,598 acres to nearby landowners for "fines" of £7,760 and small annual rents.

Riots occurred in response, destroying existing enclosures in spring 1627 and again in 1628 following the final division of the lands. Legal challenges were also made, against both the rioters and the enclosures. The enclosures were challenged by local inhabitants, the Corporation of Leicester and borough residents who submitted petitions to the King and Privy Council. The Privy Council found nothing unjust about the dealings of Fleetwood however, so challenges were made in the House of Lords in June 1628. the Lords however supported Fleetwood. An order was then made by the Lords praising Fleetwood for adding substantial income to the Crown but however to halt Star Chamber proceedings against the rioters. Buchanan Sharp concludes that "it may be surmised that a quid pro quo had been worked out: if the forest's inhabitants stopped rioting and petitioning, the government would drop all legal proceedings".

==== Compensation ====
The Crown made considerable compensation to local manorial lords and tenants as well as other residents. Five lords claimed around 2,755 acres were in use by their manors; of these 1,030 went to the King, and the rest to the manorial lords. The landowners had in turn to compensate their tenants for their losses. 554 acres went to tenants according to the size of their holdings, at around 4–6 acres to the yardland. Around 1.5–2 acres went to each cottage in addition. The Crown also compensated freeholders in other townships at a similar rate and gave 40 acres to the borough of Leicester for the maintenance of their poor. However, compensation would not have been made to the many families who had established homes on assart land (i.e., those who were occupying part of the forest without permission). The June 1628 petition to the House of Lords claimed that the families in 100 ancient cottages would not be compensated and neither would many more living in newly built cottages.

=== Malvern ===
In 1630 Charles I granted one-third part of the Forest or Chace of Malvern to Sir Robert Heath, then Attorney-General, and Sir Cornelius Vermuyden. In the meantime many rights or claims of right had arisen by grant or long usages in the lapse of several centuries. When the grantees began to enclose the Chace the commoners and other persons interested disputed their right to do so. Several riots and disturbances took place in consequence.

Nevertheless, a decree was issued in 1632 for the "disafforestation of the Chace of Malvern, and for freeing the lands within the bounds, limits, and jurisdictions thereof, of and from the game of deer there and the forest laws". By this decree (to obviate all disputes) one-third part only was to be severed and divided by commissioners, but the other two parts "shall remain and continue unto and amongst the commoners, and be held by them according to their several rights and interests, discharged and freed from his Majesty's game of deer there, and of and from the forest laws, and the liberties and franchises of Forest and Chace, in such sort as by the said decree it doth and may appear".

Further disputes with landowners resulted in clarifications that any land that was disafforested had to be in proportion to the quality of the land as a whole, so that the common was not the most meagre land.

== Further unrest ==
Further unrest took place during the run up to the Civil War, with episodes continuing to break out until the 1660s.

In the Forest of Dean, 22,000 acres were disafforested, with 4,000 going to manorial lords and freeholders in compensation in 1639. 18,000 acres were to go to the Crown, and granted to Sir John Winter. Riots ensued in 1641. Winter's claim to the lands was voided by Parliament in March 1642, in part because he had failed to pay. His assets were sequestrated for supporting the Crown during the Civil War. The Protectorate tried to enclose a third of the forest in 1657, leaving two thirds to the Commoners. Although a relatively generous settlement, it caused resistance in April and May 1659, when fences of new enclosures were broken and cattle brought in to graze. Royalists including Edward Massey attempted to bring the discontented to the side of Charles II.

After the restoration, Sir John Winter successfully reasserted his right to the Forest of Dean. However, in 1668 forest law was reestablished by Act of Parliament. in 1672, the King's ironworks were closed, to reduce pressure on the forest from mining.

== Sources ==
- P. Large, "From Swanimote to disafforestation: Feckenham Forest in the early 17th century" in R. Hoyle (ed.), The estates of the English Crown, 1558–1640 (Cambridge University Press, 1992)
- Geoff Eley (October 1988), Reviving the English Revolution, Verso Books, ISBN 9780860911944, 0860911942
- Buchanan Sharp (1980), In contempt of all authority, Berkeley: University of California Press, ISBN 0-520-03681-6, OL 4742314M, 0520036816
- Popular Protest, Buchanan Sharpe, in Barry Reay (June 1988), Popular Culture in Seventeenth Century England, Routledge, ISBN 978-0-415-00040-6, OL 10186248M, 0415000408
- Lees, Edwin (1877). The Forest and Chase of Malvern. Transactions of the Malvern Naturalists' Field Club. pp. 16–17.
