= John Methuen (diplomat) =

English diplomat, judge and Member of Parliament

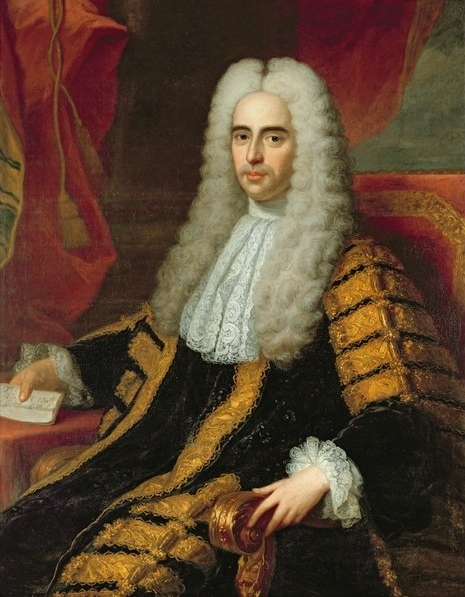
- "The Rt Hon John Methuen as Lord Chancellor of Ireland", by Adrien Carpentiers

Personal details
- Born: 1650 Bradford-on-Avon, Wiltshire, England
- Died: 2 July 1706 (age 55–56) Lisbon, Portugal
- Spouse: Mary Cheevers
- Children: Sir Paul Methuen, Henry Methuen, Isabella Methuen
- Occupation: Politician

John Methuen (1650–1706) was an English diplomat, judge and member of parliament. He held office simultaneously as Lord Chancellor of Ireland and English ambassador to Portugal. In the latter role, he and his son Paul negotiated the Methuen Treaty, the achievement for which John is chiefly remembered.

== Early life and career ==
He was born in Bradford-on-Avon in Wiltshire, the eldest son of Paul Methuen (died 1667), who was said to be the richest cloth merchant in England, and his wife Grace Ashe, daughter of John Ashe, whose lucrative cloth business was inherited by his son-in-law. The family, whose name was also spelt Methwin or Methwyn, was of Scottish origin: Paul broke with family tradition by not entering holy orders. On his death, John inherited the estate which his father had bought at Bishops Cannings, near Devizes. His father's large fortune was divided between John, his six siblings and their mother; his brother William took over the family business.

He attended St. Edmund Hall, Oxford but apparently did not take a degree. He entered the Inner Temple and was called to the Bar in 1674. He married Mary Cheevers (or Chivers), of Quemerford, Wiltshire, daughter of Seacole Cheevers and Eleanor Roberts. Her father, like his, was a rich clothier. They had five children, including the diplomat Sir Paul Methuen, of whom three survived into adulthood. The marriage was unhappy, due to John's notorious infidelity, and ended in separation. As a condition of the separation, he was required to pay Mary substantial alimony.

In 1685 he became Master in Chancery, a post he held for the rest of his life, despite numerous complaints about his inefficiency. He was elected to the House of Commons of England as member for Devizes in 1690 and sat for that constituency, with one short break, until his death.

== Envoy to Portugal ==
He was appointed the English envoy to Portugal in 1691, to his delight, as he looked forward to a "not too onerous position in an agreeable climate". No doubt also the salary was welcome, as he was paying substantial alimony to his estranged wife. The precise reason for his selection is unclear, but it may have been due to his family's prominence in the business world, as the English Crown anticipated that the two countries in due course would negotiate a commercial treaty. Tragedy struck the family in 1694 when John's younger son Henry was killed in a brawl with an English merchant in Lisbon.

John established good relations with King Pedro II which were to be of value later in negotiating the Methuen Treaty, but was required to return to England on his appointment to the Board of Trade, while his son Paul remained in Lisbon to act as deputy envoy. John had two powerful friends at Court in James Vernon, the Under-Secretary of State, and Vernon's great patron Robert Spencer, 2nd Earl of Sunderland, who, though he was not then a Minister of the Crown, was probably King William's closest political adviser. On the death of Sir Charles Porter, they recommended Methuen as Lord Chancellor of Ireland. Although Lord Somers, the English Lord Chancellor, evidently thought little of Methuen, saying that he knew of "nothing that qualified him for such an office", Sunderland at that time effectively controlled Court patronage, and Methuen was duly appointed. Methuen's crucial support for the Government during the attainder of Sir John Fenwick—in particular, his eloquent speech refuting the argument that two Crown witnesses were necessary to support a Bill of Attainder, as was unquestionably the case in a trial for treason—was probably another reason for giving him preferment.

== Lord Chancellor of Ireland ==
In 1697 Methuen was appointed Lord Chancellor of Ireland and made a member of the Privy Council of Ireland. Methuen's political experience in England and Portugal could not have adequately prepared him for the bitter and faction-ridden world of Irish politics. The Irish Parliament during his tenure as Lord Chancellor dealt with issues of security, trade, whether to honour (even in part) the articles of the Treaty of Limerick, and the Penal Laws, all of which were the subject of intense controversy and heated debate. Methuen, as Speaker of the Irish House of Lords, was heavily involved in these debates, and claimed that on the debates on the Limerick Treaty articles alone he had attended the House 22 times. He was however generally regarded as being singularly unsuccessful in managing Parliament. He clashed with the powerful William King, Bishop of Derry, and was severely criticised in England for his handling of the debates. He was required to spend more and more time in England, leading to complaints that he was an absentee Chancellor; Elrington Ball in his history of the Irish judiciary remarked that though he held office he could hardly be said to occupy it. Methuen complained that his reputation had been ruined and contemplated resignation, due to his belief that King William III had lost confidence in him. He quarrelled with the hot-tempered Thomas Fitzmaurice, 1st Earl of Kerry, who challenged him to a duel. The matter became public when Richard Ingoldsby, later one of the Lord Justices of Ireland, who carried the challenge, was arrested, but the King quickly ordered Ingoldsby's release.

The Irish-born writer John Dunton, visiting Dublin in 1698, left a valuable sketch of the Irish Courts. He described most of the Irish judges as being men of such high reputation that "no one complains of them"; but made a significant exception for Methuen, who he remarked seems to be out of vogue.

== Return to Portugal ==
He returned to Portugal as the English envoy and then as full Ambassador, holding this office with some intervals from 1702 until his death. Until 1703 he was permitted to retain the Irish Chancellorship, although he never sat as a judge again, but in that year the Lord Lieutenant of Ireland, James Butler, 2nd Duke of Ormonde, insisted on his dismissal, saying bluntly that "he would not have him". In 1703 he received the title Ambassador Extraordinary, but not without some difficulty. Initially Lord Nottingham, the Secretary of State, refused it to him, causing him to complain to the royal confidante Sarah Churchill, who in turn complained to Queen Anne. The Queen, whose long friendship with Sarah was rapidly wearing thin, partly due to Sarah's notoriously bad temper, replied wearily that "I always took it for granted that Mr. Methuen was to have the title Ambassador Extraordinary".

=== Methuen Treaty ===
In 1702 Methuen persuaded the Portuguese Government to break their alliance with Louis XIV, and then began lengthy negotiations for an offensive and defensive alliance. Paul in his father's absence ultimately concluded the Treaty on 16 May 1703, a step of great significance in the War of the Spanish Succession.

John, on his return from England, concluded a commercial treaty on 27 December 1703, opening Portugal to the English cloth trade in return for preferential rates of duty on the import of wine. How beneficial the Treaty was to either side, in the long run, has been debated. Possibly its most important result was the development of the port wine trade, and thus it was popularly known as "the Port-Wine Treaty".

=== Last years ===
Methuen in later life increasingly suffered from gout and rheumatism; his health failed and he died at Lisbon, while still in office, on 2 July 1706. His body was embalmed and he was buried in Westminster Abbey. His son Paul (c. 1672 – 1757) and his daughter Isabella (died 1711) are buried close by.

== Reputation ==
Despite his undoubted skills as a diplomat, Methuen was a controversial figure, who made many enemies, including Jonathan Swift, who dismissed him as "a profligate rogue without religion or morals, cunning enough but without abilities of any kind". His much-publicized affair with Sarah Earle, the wife of a diplomatic colleague, damaged his professional standing. Sarah appears to have been living with him at the time of his death, and he remembered her in his last will and testament.

His speech on Fenwick's attainder shows him to have been a gifted lawyer, but as a judge, he was not highly regarded in Ireland, although his admirers maintained that he made several necessary reforms to the legal system. Inevitably his reputation suffered from the comparison to his predecessor, the brilliant and popular Sir Charles Porter.

Even among his Whig colleagues, opinion on his abilities varied: James Vernon thought highly of him, but Lord Somers clearly did not, and his friendship with Sunderland did his reputation no good in the eyes of those (who were probably a majority of the political class) who regarded Sunderland himself as "the subtlest villain on the face of the earth".

== Notes ==
Political offices
Preceded by In commission – Title last held by Charles Porter	Lord Chancellor of Ireland; 1697–1703	Succeeded by Sir Richard Cox
