= Thomas Fanshawe, 1st Viscount Fanshawe =

English politician

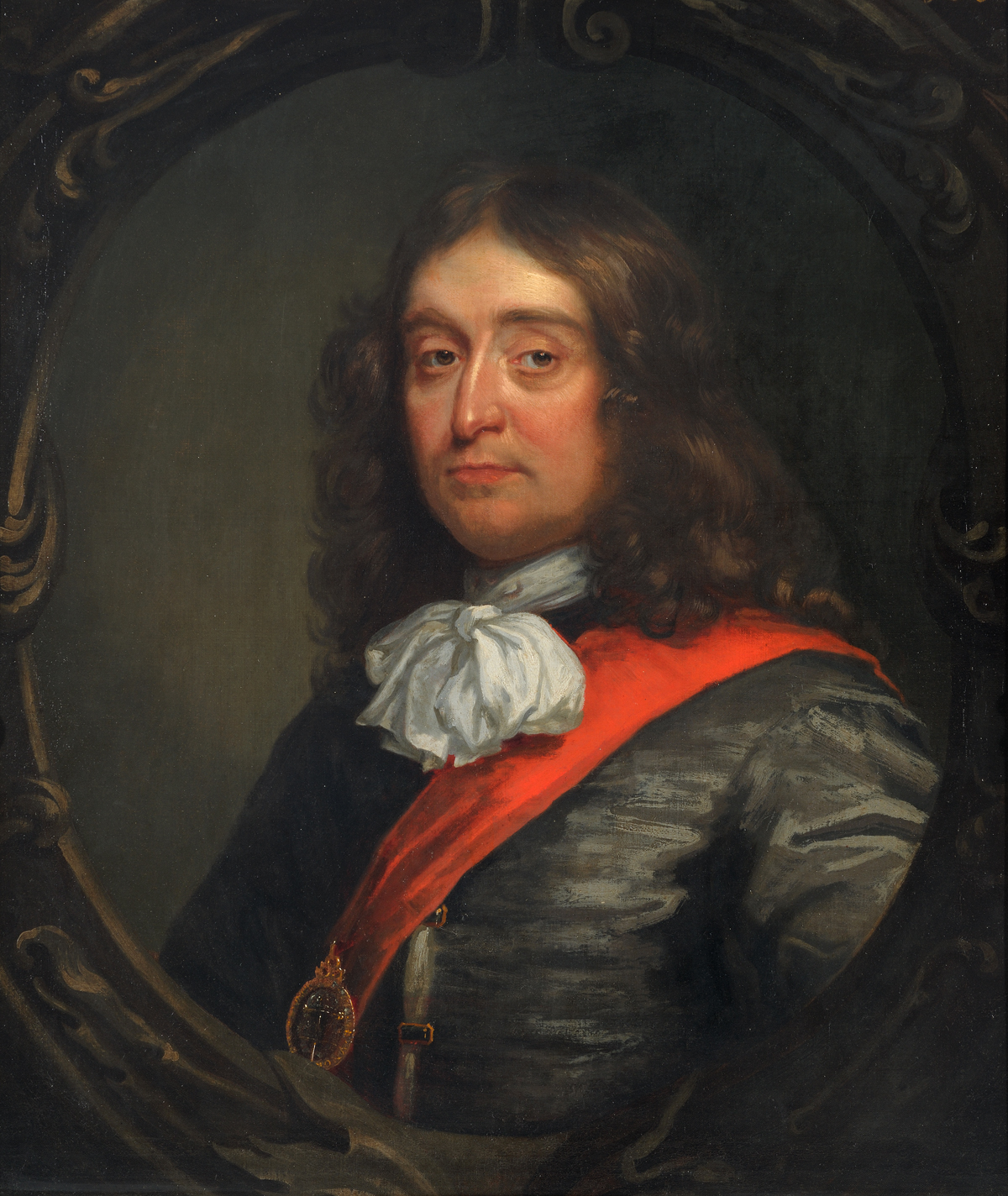
Thomas Fanshawe, 1st Viscount Fanshawe, by Mary Beale

Thomas Fanshawe, 1st Viscount Fanshawe KB (1596 – 30 March 1665) was an English politician who sat in the House of Commons at various times between 1621 and 1661. He supported the Royalist cause in the English Civil War. Following the Restoration he was raised to the peerage.

== Background ==
Fanshawe was the son of Sir Henry Fanshawe, of Ware Park, Hertfordshire and his wife Elizabeth Smythe, daughter of Thomas Smythe, of Ostenhanger Kent. His father was Remembrancer of the Exchequer.

== Public life ==
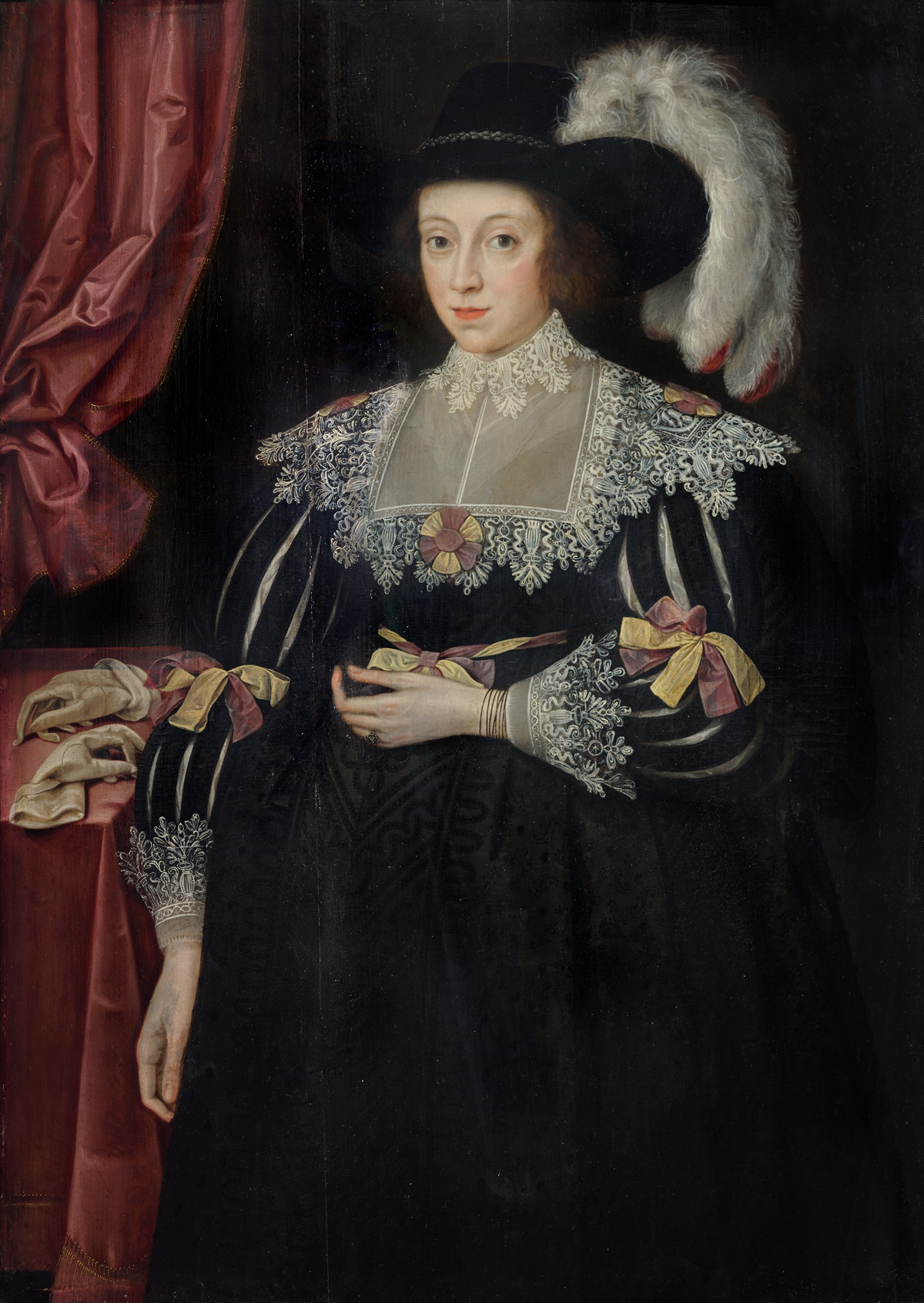
Portrait of Fanshawe's first wife, Anne Fanshawe, by Marcus Gheeraerts the Younger

Fanshawe succeeded as remembrancer of the exchequer on the death of his father in 1616, the post being held in trust for him until he was able to take up his duties in 1619. In 1621 he was elected Member of Parliament for Hertford. He was re-elected for Hertford in 1624 and 1625, and for Preston in 1626. At the coronation of Charles I, on 2 February 1626, he was made a Knight of the Bath. In 1628 he was re-elected MP for Hertford and sat until 1629 when King Charles decided to rule without parliament for eleven years. In April 1640, Fanshawe was re-elected MP for Hertford for the Short Parliament and was re-elected MP for Hertford for the Long Parliament in November 1640.

He was commissioner of array for the king in 1641 and fought on the Royalist side at the Battle of Edgehill. He was disabled from sitting in parliament on 25 November 1643. He had his property sequestrated, as orders for the sale of Fanshawe's goods were issued by the parliament on 29 June 1643, and on 1 January 1644 a committee was appointed to examine a report that Sir William Litton had concealed part of Fanshawe's property. He ultimately compounded for the recovery of some of his estates for £1,310, but he was practically ruined. Fanshawe was with Prince Charles in Jersey in April 1646, and in August his brother Sir Richard Fanshawe visited him at Caen, where he lay ill. Following the Restoration, in 1661 Fanshawe was again elected MP for Hertfordshire for the Cavalier Parliament. He was also created Viscount Fanshawe of Dromore, in the Irish peerage on 5 September 1661.

== Family ==
Lord Fanshawe's first wife was Anne Alington, daughter of Sir Giles Alington, of Horseheath by Lady Dorothy Cecil, daughter of the Earl of Exeter. They had one daughter Anne (1628-1714). Upon his first wife's death, Lord Fanshawe married Elizabeth Cockayne, fourth daughter of Sir William Cockayne. Lord Fanshawe's sons and daughters by Elizabeth Cockayne included: Thomas Fanshawe, 2nd Viscount Fanshawe (1632–1674), Henry Fanshawe, Charles Fanshawe, 4th Viscount Fanshawe (1643–1710), Simon Fanshawe, 5th Viscount Fanshawe (ca.1649- 23 October 1716) and Elizabeth Fanshawe, who married a distant relative named Sir Thomas Fanshawe of Jenkins. Lord Fanshawe died intestate at his town house in Hatton Garden, and was buried at Ware on 30 March 1665.

Some say that his second wife (and widow), Elizabeth (Cockayne) Fanshawe, remarried to Sir Thomas Rich, Baronet, but that is an error: the Elizabeth Cockayne who married Sir Thomas Rich was also a daughter of a William Cockayne, but a different William: Merchant, Citizen and Skinner of London.

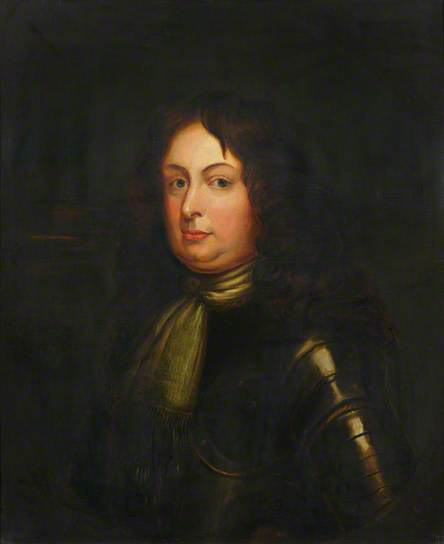
Thomes Fanshawe

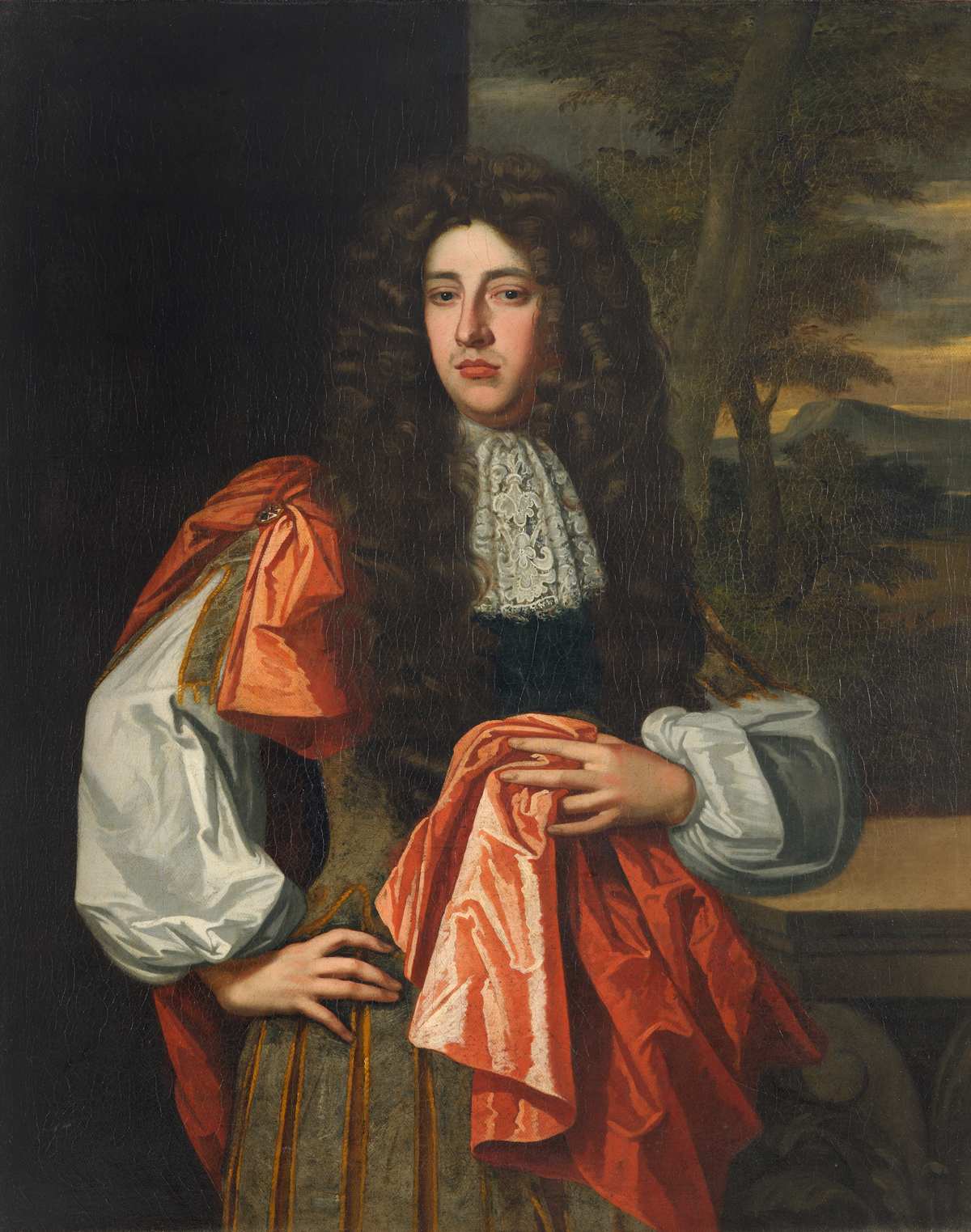
Charles Fanshawe

Parliament of England
Constituency re-enfranchised	Member of Parliament for Hertford; 1621–1625; With: William Ashton	Succeeded by Sir William Harington; Sir Capell Bedell
Preceded by Sir William Hervey; Henry Banister	Member of Parliament for Preston; 1626; With: George Gerard	Succeeded by Robert Carr; George Gerard
Preceded by Sir William Harington; Sir Capell Bedell	Member of Parliament for Hertford; 1628–1629; With: Sir Edward Howard 1628; Sir Charles Morrison 1628; John Carey, Viscount Rochford 1629	Parliament suspended until 1640
Parliament suspended since 1629	Member of Parliament for Hertford; 1640–1643; With: Viscount Cranborne	Succeeded by Viscount Cranborne; William Leman
Peerage of Ireland
New creation	Viscount Fanshawe; 1661–1665	Succeeded by Thomas Fanshawe
