= St Mary's Church, Ware =

Church in Hertfordshire, England

Coordinates: 51°48′43″N 0°01′59″W

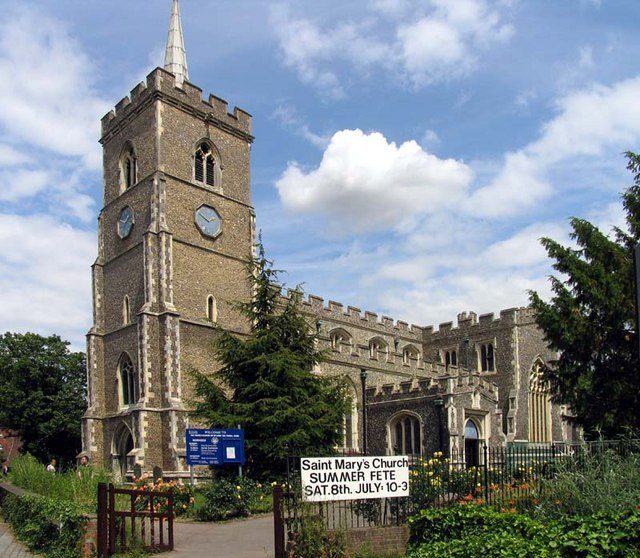

- Shown within Hertfordshire
- OS grid reference: TL 35680 14430
- Country: England
- Denomination: Church of England
- Website: stmarysware.co.uk

Administration
- Province: Canterbury
- Diocese: St Albans

St Mary's Church is a grade I listed parish church in Ware, Hertfordshire, England.

== History ==
There has been a church on the site since the Norman Conquest. The Domesday Book mentions the presence of a priest at Ware, and the existence of a church is confirmed by a reference in another document from the reign of William the Conqueror, a charter given to Hugh de Grandmesnil.

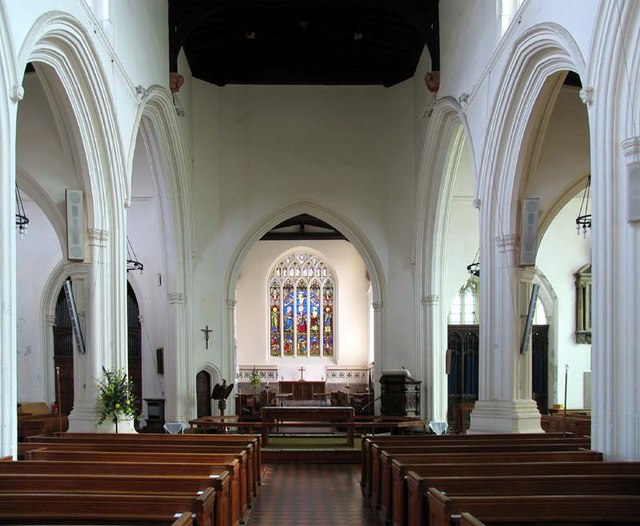
Interior

The chancel, the oldest part of the present building, dates from the thirteenth century, when the church served the town and the monks of the Benedictine priory.

The church was expanded in the 1390s with the addition of clerestories and aisles, which feature corbels of Joan of Kent, Dowager Princess of Wales, her badges and her husbands. The octagonal font with carvings of saints and the head of King Richard II in the south porch date from the same period.

The church was restored in the 19th century by George Godwin.

== Architecture ==
The building is faced in flint.

The tower is surmounted by a short spire of the type known as a "Hertfordshire spike" (see note^{1}).

== People connected with the church ==
- Charles Chauncy, who served as vicar of the church in the reign of Charles I, emigrated to America where he became President of Harvard.
- In the 16th century the Fanshawe family acquired an estate at Ware, and members of the family were buried in the church: for example,
  - Thomas Fanshawe (remembrancer of the exchequer) (1533-1601)
  - Katherine Ferrers (1634-1660) the wife of Thomas Fanshawe, Second Viscount Fanshawe of Ware Park, and reputedly the Wicked Lady, a notorious highwaywoman.
  - Sir Richard Fanshawe (1608-1666), a politician and writer who served as Charles II´s ambassador to Spain.

== Notes ==
1.Flèche or short spire rising from a church-tower, its base concealed by a parapet, common in Herts., England. Pevsner, N., Cherry. "BoE, Hertfordshire". (1977)
