= Fanshawe baronets =

Extinct baronetcy in the Baronetage of Ireland

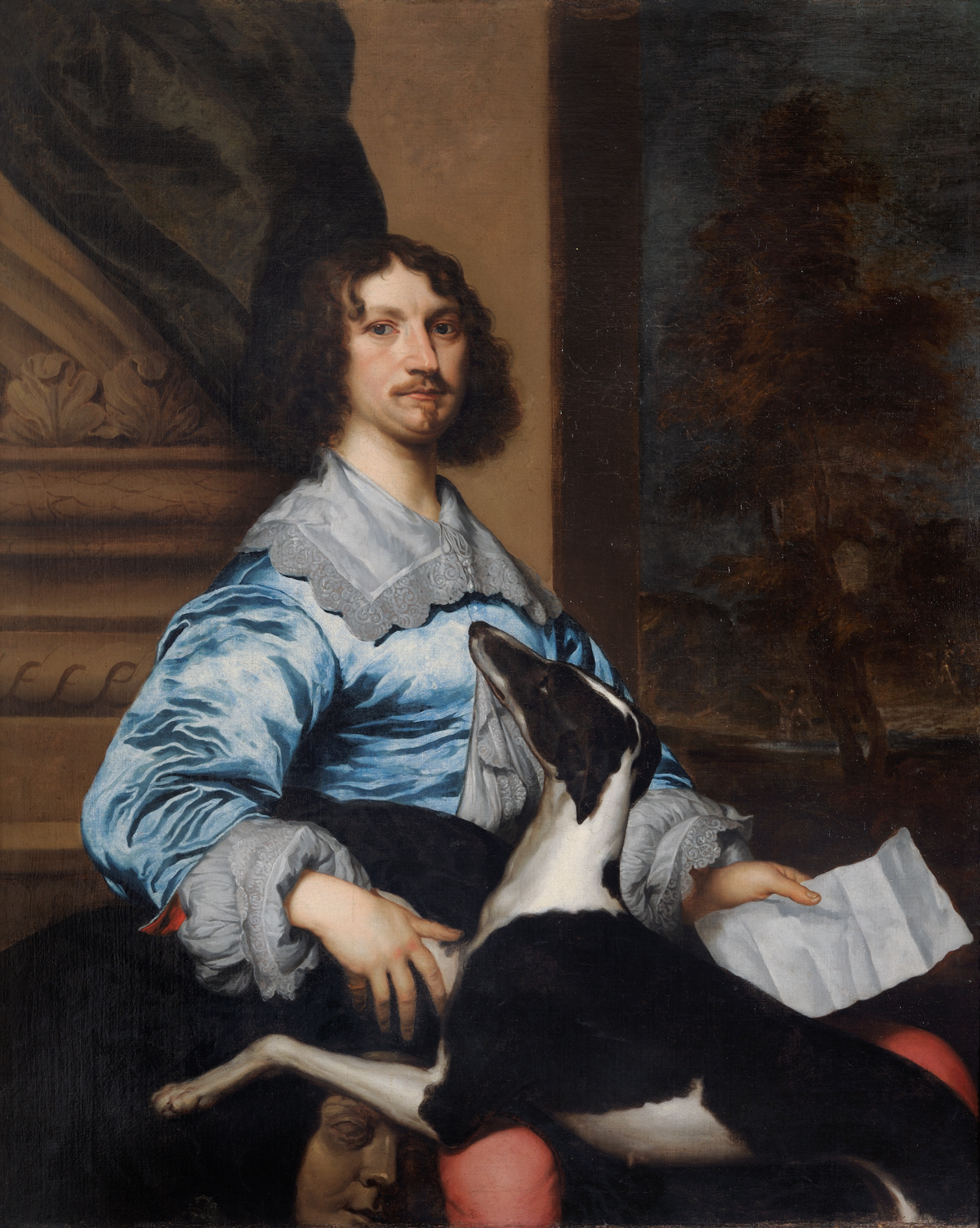
Sir Richard Fanshawe, 1st Baronet by William Dobson

The Fanshawe Baronetcy, of Donamore in Ireland, was a title in the Baronetage of Ireland. It was created on 2 September 1650 for the diplomat, translator and poet Richard Fanshawe. He was the son of Sir Henry Fanshawe, the grandson of Thomas Fanshawe, the brother of Thomas Fanshawe, 1st Viscount Fanshawe and the nephew of Sir Thomas Fanshawe and William Fanshawe. The title became extinct on the early death of the second Baronet in 1694.

Ann, Lady Fanshawe, wife of the first Baronet, was a memoirist.

== Fanshawe baronets, of Donamore (1650) ==
- Sir Richard Fanshawe, 1st Baronet (1608–1666)
- Sir Richard Fanshawe, 2nd Baronet (1665–1694)

== See also ==
- Viscount Fanshawe
