= Deborah Swift =

English writer

Deborah Swift (born 1955), who has also written as Davina Blake, is an English writer of historical fiction, based in north west Lancashire.

Her first published novel was The Lady's Slipper (2010), which alludes to the lady's slipper orchid found in the Silverdale area near her home. Levens Hall features as one of the locations of the book, which is set in 1660 and involves the persecution of local Quakers.

The Gilded Lily (2012) follows some of the same characters but moves the location to London and considers aspects of beauty and cosmetics.

A Divided Inheritance (2013) starts in London in 1609 but the action moves to Seville during the expulsion of the Moors and reflects this turbulent period of European history.

Swift's Shadow on the Highway (2014) is the first of The Highway Trilogy of young adult novels, and is based on the life of highwaywoman Katherine Fanshawe, also known as Lady Katherine Ferrers. The second in the trilogy, Spirit of the Highway (2015) is told in the voice of the ghost of a roundhead farmer's son who loved Katherine. Lady of the Highway (2016) completes the trilogy.

Past Encounters (2014), published under the name Davina Blake, is a story set in Carnforth which features the filming of Brief Encounter at Carnforth railway station in 1944 and uncovers a husband's wartime secrets.

Pleasing Mr Pepys (2017) is a " re-imagining of the events" from the diary of Samuel Pepys. It forms a trilogy with A Plague on Mr Pepys (2018) and Entertaining Mr Pepys (2019).

The Occupation (2019) is set on Jersey under German occupation in 1940.

== List of works ==
- The Lady's Slipper (2010, Macmillan: ISBN 9780230746862)
- The Gilded Lily (2012, Pan: ISBN 9780330543439)
- A Divided Inheritance (2013, Pan: ISBN 9780330543446)
- Past Encounters (as Davina Blake, 2014, SApere: ISBN 978-1499568257)
- The Occupation (2019, Sapere: ISBN 978-1913335274)

=== The Highway Trilogy ===
- Shadow on the Highway (2014, ISBN 978-1500549831)
- Spirit of the Highway (2015, ISBN 978-1517279486)
- Lady of the Highway (2016, ISBN 978-1533248954)

=== Mr Pepys trilogy ===
- Pleasing Mr Pepys (2017, ISBN 978-1786154187)
- A Plague on Mr Pepys (2018, ISBN 978-1786154972)
- Entertaining Mr Pepys (2019, ISBN 978-1786154156)
