= Featherstonhaugh =

Featherstonhaugh (generally pronounced as written but occasionally simply "Featherston"), also spelt Fetherstonhaugh and Featherstonehaugh, is an English surname. The name comes from Featherstonhaugh in Northumberland, from the Old English feðere (feather), stān (stone), and healh (corner).

According to Plum Lines, the journal of the P. G. Wodehouse Society, The BBC Pronunciation Dictionary of the British Isles (1983) gives the primary pronunciation of 'Featherston-haw' but also lists alternative pronunciations 'Fanshaw', 'Feston-haw', 'Feeson-hay', and 'Feerston-haw', although no evidence is given of individuals using these variants. Supporting Debrett's Correct Form in pronouncing the name as written is the experience of the barrister Guy Fetherstonhaugh of the established family of that name: "It’s not 'Fanshaw' for me, and I don’t know that any other Featherstonhaughs say that ... Everybody repeats it because they like to sound knowledgeable. If I'm in front of a judge who doesn’t know me, he’ll call me 'Fanshaw' because he thinks it shows that he's in the know". Upon learning his name in fact being 'pronounced as it's spelt', Fetherstonhaugh says, "People always look slightly crestfallen."

== Notable people ==
- Francis Fetherston (c. 1575 – after 1624), an English statesman
- George William Featherstonhaugh (1780–1866), an English-American geologist
- George W. Featherstonhaugh Jr. (1814–1900), an American legislator and businessman
- Godfrey Fetherstonhaugh (1859–1928), an Irish politician
- F. B. Fetherstonhaugh (1863–1945), a Canadian patent lawyer
- Constance Featherstonhaugh (later Benson; 1864–1946), an English actress
- Francis Featherstonhaugh Johnston (1891–1963), an Anglican bishop of Egypt
- Harold Lea Fetherstonhaugh (1887–1971), a Canadian architect
- Buddy Featherstonhaugh (1909–1976), an English jazz saxophonist
- Mary Featherstonhaugh Frampton (1928–2014), an English civil servant
- Robert Fetherstonhaugh (born 1932), an English cricketer
- Alexander Featherstonhaugh Wylie (born 1951), a judge of the Supreme Courts of Scotland

== Fetherstonhaugh baronets ==
- Sir Matthew Fetherstonhaugh (1714–1774), 1st Baronet
  - Sir Henry Fetherstonhaugh, known as Harry (1754–1846), 2nd Baronet

== Artistic and fictional works ==
- The Featherstonehaughs, a British dance company
- "Cholmondeley Featherstonehaugh", an episode of the TV series Nanny and the Professor.
- Stanley Featherstonehaugh Ukridge (the middle name pronounced "Fanshaw", apparently the origin of this idiosyncratic pronunciation which is not encountered in reality) a fictional character in the short stories of P. G. Wodehouse
- Marcus Featherstone's terrier "Foon" ("written 'Featherstonehaugh'") in the detective novel Police at the Funeral by Margery Allingham (1931).
- Harry Featherstonhaugh in the Lady Hardcastle Mystery Books by T.E. Kinsey.
- Piers Featherstonehaugh is the protagonist in the game The Gene Machine.
- In E. M. Forster's Maurice, Clive Durham refers to a Featherstonhaugh who has a pianola. In the film, he pronounces it "Feestonhay".

== See also ==
- Featherstone Castle
- Dover House
- Featherstone (disambiguation)
