= George Bonner =

British judge, barrister, and legal scholar

A portrait of Sir George Bonner in the robes of the King's Bench Division

Sir George Albert Bonner (9 March 1862 – 27 April 1952) was a British judge, barrister and legal scholar. From 1906 to 1937, he served as a Master of the King's Bench Division, High Court of Justice. In 1927 he was appointed as the Senior Master of the King's Bench and King's Remembrancer, the most ancient position in the British judiciary. Later that year he was knighted as a Knight Bachelor in King George V's Birthday Honours of 1927. He also produced several works of legal scholarship, including 'The Law of Motor Cars and Hackney and other Carriages on the Highways', one of the earliest texts on the laws of automobiles, published in 1898.

== Biography ==
=== Early life ===
George Bonner was born on 9 March 1862, the second son of Charles Foster Bonner and Elizabeth Swaine. His father was a successful solicitor based in Lincolnshire and the family grew up in Ayscoughfee Hall in Spalding. He attended Magdalen College School in Oxford before going up to study law at New College, Oxford. Despite failing his Moderations (first year exams) and the mandatory divinity paper, Bonner graduated with a fourth class degree in 1883. He was then called to the bar, Inner Temple in June 1885.

=== Career ===
After practising law as a Barrister for a decade, in 1898 Bonner published The Law of Motor Cars and Hackney and other Carriages on the Highways, an early work setting out the law in relation to motor cars which at the time still required individuals to walk in front of the automobile with a flag. A second edition was published in 1905.

Later that year, Bonner was given a temporary judicial appointment in British West Africa by the Attorney General Sir Richard Webster following a recent native uprising. Arriving in Sierra Leone, he lived with the Governor for several weeks before setting out on his circuit across the north of country where he was to sentence those natives found guilty of various crimes during the insurrection in which over 600 people were murdered. He oversaw the sentencing of, amongst others, 240 individuals found guilty of capital offences, sentencing 151 of them to death but recommending mercy for all those found guilty. 19 of the individuals ended up being hanged. He returned home to the United Kingdom in December of that year.

Bonner was appointed a Master of the King's Bench Division of the High Court of Justice in January 1906, serving for the following 31 years. In 1927 he was made the Senior Master of the court, thus assuming the role of the King's Remembrancer, now the most ancient judicial position in the United Kingdom. Later that year, in the Birthday Honours he was knighted as a Knight Bachelor. He retired from his role on the King's Bench in 1937.

Following his retirement, he undertook tribunal work for aliens whose status had changed due to the outbreak of war from that of "refugee" to "enemy alien", as a result of which on 1 November 1939 he and his co-tribunal chairmen wrote a lengthy and important letter to The Times identifying the brutalities of the Nazi regime and its concentration camps.

=== Personal life ===
Bonner was a keen horseman all his life and was a member of the Pegasus Club, a point-to-point club for members of the Bar, which he joined in 1901. His horse "The Count" came 2nd in the Bar Heavy-Weight Race in 1911. Bonner remained chairman of the club during the war years and kept the club alive during this difficult period. He was also a keen golfer and member of the Bar Golfing Society.

He was an active Freemason attaining the rank of Past Assistant Grand Registrar, having been initiated in the Victoria Rifles Lodge No.822 in 1891 from which he resigned five years later, but remaining a member of the Midland & Oxford Bar Lodge and the Inns of Court Chapter for many years. He was also an honorary member of the Northern Bar Lodge.

=== Death ===
On 19 December 1896, Bonner married Eveleen Carolyn Lewis at Kensington Parish Church. They had two daughters, Sylvia Concanen Swaine Bonner and Eveleen Frances Calthrop Bonner. Sir George spent the last few years of his life in Oakley Hall in Cirencester. He died on 27 April 1952, bequeathing his estate to his five grandchildren.

== Published works ==
- The Law of Motor Cars and Hackney and other Carriages on the Highways - first published in 1898, second edition in 1905
- A History of the Office of the King's Remembrancer - 1928
- Notes on Niblett Hall and the Alienation Office - 1942
- The Gold Collar of SS and the Trial of the Pyx - 1943
