= Barbara Fontaine =

British judge and solicitor (born 1953)

Barbara Janet Fontaine (born 29 December 1953) is a British retired judge and solicitor. She served as Senior Master of the King's Bench Division from 2014 to 2023 and as the Queen's Remembrancer from 2014 to 2022 and as the King's Remembrancer from 2022 to 2023; she is the first woman and first solicitor to hold this ancient post.

She was an articled clerk at Bird & Bird from 1976 to 1978, and then worked as a solicitor at Hill Dickinson, Coward Chance and Baker McKenzie.

She retired from the position of King's Remembrancer on 1 September 2023.
