= Buddy Featherstonhaugh =

English jazz saxophonist and clarinetist (1909–1976)

- Born: Rupert Edward Lee Featherstonhaugh; 4 October 1909; Paris, France
- Died: 12 July 1976 (aged 66) London, United Kingdom
- Genres: Jazz
- Occupations: Musician; racing car driver
- Instruments: Saxophone; clarinet
- Years active: 1927–1957

Rupert Edward Lee "Buddy" Featherstonhaugh (feather-ston-hore; 4 October 1909 – 12 July 1976) was an English jazz saxophonist and clarinetist.

== Musical career ==
Born in Paris in 1909, the son of an English marine architect and his Scottish wife. His grandfather, George William Featherstonhaugh, a geologist and geographer, had already emigrated to America. After moving to England, he studied in Sussex, and had his first professional gig with Pat O'Malley in 1927. He was with Spike Hughes from 1930 to 1932, and toured England in Billy Mason's band behind Louis Armstrong that same year and in 1933 he recorded with a group called The Cosmopolitans, which included Fletcher Allen. He recorded with Valaida Snow in 1935 and Benny Carter in 1937.

During World War II, he led a Royal Air Force band which had among its members Vic Lewis, Don McAffer, and Jack Parnell. They went on to record as The BBC Radio Rhythm Club Sextet during 1943–45. After the war he toured Iceland in 1946, and then left the jazz scene, taking up work as a car salesman. In 1956 he returned to play (and recorded) in a quintet with trumpeter Leon Calvert, Roy Sidewell, Kenny Wheeler, and Bobby Wellins. He also appeared with the band at Butlin's Holiday Camps in the mid-1950s. He toured the Middle East in 1957, after which he retired.

== Racing car interests ==
He also was an occasional racing car driver. In 1934 he took over Whitney Straight's car, a Maserati 26M, winning the Albi Grand Prix as member of the Team Straight.

== See also ==
- Featherstonhaugh
- First English Public Jam Session
