= Manuel Teles da Silva, 1st Marquis of Alegrete =

Manuel Teles da Silva, 1st Marquis of Alegrete and 2nd Count of Vilar Maior (13 February 1641 - 12 September 1709) was a Portuguese noble, diplomat and writer.

== Biography ==
He was the son of Fernão Teles de Menezes, 1st Count of Vilar Maior and Mariana de Mendonça.

He fought in the Portuguese Restoration War and contributed to the capture of Évora following the Battle of Ameixial, while serving as colonel of a terço (regiment) of militia, at the age of only twenty-seven. In 1669, he was appointed President of the Casa da Suplicação (High Court of Appeal). In 1672, while already holding the office of Councillor of State, he was also appointed Overseer of the Treasury (Vedor da Fazenda).

In 1686, he received the honorable assignment of traveling to Heidelberg to escort Princess Maria Sophia of Neuburg, daughter of Philip William, Elector Palatine to Portugal to become the second wife of King Pedro II. This mission earned him the title of Marquis of Alegrete, bestowed upon him by the king on 19 August 1687. The Marquis was deeply devoted to Pedro and had sided with him in the disputes against his brother, Afonso VI.

In 1703, he represented Portugal in the negotiations with England leading to the Methuen Treaty.

An accomplished Latinist, he wrote a work in that language titled De rebus gentis Joannis II, which was published in Lisbon in 1689 and saw a subsequent edition in The Hague in 1712. The Marquis of Alegrete began writing a history of John I in Latin, though it remained unfinished. He also left behind numerous personal letters, epigrams, and panegyrics in Latin in manuscript form. A letter of his praising the book A vida de Santa Isabel (The Life of Saint Elizabeth), by Fernando Correia de Lacerda, was published.

=== Marriage and children ===
He married Luísa Coutinho, daughter of the Counts of Sabugal and had 10 children, including :

- Fernão Teles da Silva (1662–1734) , 2nd Marquis of Alegrete, father of
  - Manuel Teles da Silva, 3rd Marquis of Alegrete (1682—1736)
- Nuno da Silva Teles, Rector of the University of Coimbra.
