= Donald Featherstone =

Don or Donald Featherstone may refer to:

- Don Featherstone (artist) (1936–2015), creator of the pink flamingo lawn ornament
- Don Featherstone (filmmaker), professional documentary filmmaker
- Don Featherstone (filmmaker, 1902–1984), amateur filmmaker
- Donald Featherstone (wargamer) (1918–2013), British author of books on wargaming and military history
