= Richard Ferguson (highwayman) =

Richard "Galloping Dick" Ferguson (died 26 March 1800) was an English highwayman who, with partner Jerry Abershawe, raided the area around London during the late 18th century.

== Early life ==
Born the son of a gentleman servant in Herefordshire, England, Ferguson became involved in juvenile crime as the ringleader of local teenage pranksters while his father was often away from home traveling with his master to London, Bath and other cities.

At the age of 15, his father was able to obtain a position for him as a stable boy. As his skill in managing horses improved, he was sent to London to serve as a temporary postilion until his predecessor's recovery.

Shortly after returning to his former position in Herefordshire as a stable boy, he began to have ambitions of gaining employment as a postilion. He found a vacancy with a lady, possibly due to his father's influence, and stayed on for a time before he was discharged by his mistress upon finding him in "an improper situation" with one of the female servants.

Now in his early 20s, he was soon able to find employment elsewhere. However, he would frequently be dismissed for drunkenness, gambling, idleness and negligence, often drifting from job to job until being hired by a livery-stable in Piccadilly.

After the death of his father, who left his son his life savings of £57, he lived as a gentleman with his newfound wealth, often attending the theatre. A local courtesan, a favourite of many local highwaymen and other prominent criminals, apparently mistook Ferguson as a wealthy landowner. Spending much of his time with her, he quickly spent his savings on her and was soon forced to borrow money and other means to keep seeing her.

He was soon forced to take a job in Piccadilly as a postilion at a local inn. However, he would almost always be in debt as he continued seeing the courtesan.

== Galloping Dick & Jerry Abershawe ==
It was while driving a gentleman through the backroads of the city, when his carriage was stopped by two masked highwaymen. During the robbery, he recognized Jerry Abershawe as an acquaintance of his courtesan during the robbery however the two highwaymen were forced to flee as travelers approached.

Meeting with Ferguson at an inn soon after the incident, he and his partner were able bribe him to keep silent regarding Abershawe's identity. However, he was refused by the courtesan who learned of his actual status and never returned to her house.

He was soon approached by Abershawe who was able to persuade him to join Abershawe and his accomplice. It was later arranged by the three for Ferguson, who was able to observe wealthy guests at his inn as well as information from other drivers in the area, to relay this information to Abershawe.

In time, Ferguson was once again found himself enjoying a frivolous lifestyle often using his wealth on alcohol and gambling. However, eventually finding himself unemployed due to his activities, he was obliged to become a highwayman with Abershawe. Although admittedly inexperienced, he showed great potential as an expert horseman earning him the moniker "Galloping Dick".

== Later years ==
Following Abershawe's execution in 1795, Ferguson continued on his own with a successful career as a highwayman himself for five more years until his eventual capture by the Bow Street Runners in 1800. He was publicly executed soon after his trial at the Aylesbury Lent Assizes.
