= Brad Fanshaw =

America TV personality and entrepreneur

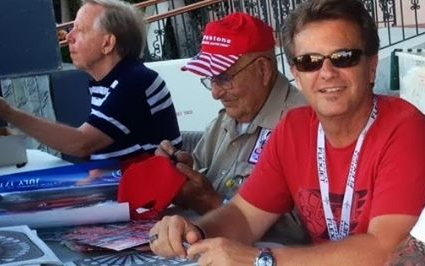
- Fanshaw Signing Autographs at TMPCC Car Show, 2013
- Born: February 27; United States
- Occupations: CEO & President Bonneville WorldWide, Inc.
- Known for: Vision Street Wear, Hot Rods by Boyd, Bonneville Inc, Bonspeed

Brad Fanshaw is co-star of Speed Channel reality television show, Car Warriors, Season 2, host of Street Rod and Custom Radio by Entertainment Radio Network, an award winning automotive fabricator and CEO/President of Bonneville Worldwide, Inc. and bonspeed 'The California Speed & Design' Studio where he has won design awards from both General Motors and Ford. Fanshaw is credited with coining the phrase, rock-n-roll automotive lifestyle and is business partner with former Van Halen bass player, Michael Anthony.

== The BMX Years ==
Fanshaw raced Bicycle Motor Cross Racing (BMX) and raced at the first BMX track in Nebraska – Yankee Hill BMX under the National Bicycle Association (NBA) sanction. He was editor of the ABA Action newspaper, co-editor of Bicycles & Dirt Magazine and a Vice President for the American Bicycle Association. Fanshaw was inducted into the Nebraska BMX Hall of Fame on August 21, 2010.

== Marketing ==
In the early 1980s, Fanshaw became an executive for Vision Streetwear, a skateboard and snowboard company famous for its innovation in design. Fanshaw’s marketing ability and promotion sense were valuable assets to Vision. While working at Vision, Fanshaw met now business partner Michael Anthony for the first time.

== Hot rod design industry ==
From bikes and boards Fanshaw moved to his red hot passion: the California hot rod industry. As a lifelong automotive enthusiast, Fanshaw’s migration to the Hot Rod design industry was intuitive. He was Boyd Coddington's business partner from 1989 to 1996 serving first as Vice President of Coddington Industries and Hot Rod’s by Boyd and eventually becoming President in the 1990s. Fanshaw helped take the company public in 1995. While a partner of Coddington, the firm earned America's Most Beautiful Roadster award four times - one of the most prestigious honors in the business handed out annually at the Grand National Roadster Show. Upon Coddington’s death in 2008, Fanshaw served as the family’s publicist.

== Design studio ==
Fanshaw struck out on his own in early 1996, and along with Michael Anthony, started an automotive design studio. The Fanshaw and Anthony partnership merges the best of automotive and rock n’ roll: “When you look at the entertainment and music industry, they're always on the very forefront of innovation and style and what trend is coming up," (Fanshaw) said. Fanshaw created a luxury line of Swiss-made watches, inspired by cars, called Bonneville Watches. One style has carbon fiber dials, a material used in race cars. All of the Swiss made watches are numbered and signed. The company also makes sport watches under the bonspeed name.

Fanshaw's bonspeed firm designs custom cars, including a special-edition Thunderbird in 2003. Fanshaw joined with Saleen Performance on this project. Fanshaw has built show cars for Ford, including the bonspeed Banshee F-150, and General Motors and he designs and makes his own line of wheels in California under the bonspeed name. He won Best New GM Exterior at the 2007 SEMA show for the GMC Sierra.

== Broadcasting and consulting ==
In addition to running his design firm, Fanshaw is the host of the national radio show Street Rod and Custom Radio, a position he has held since 2011. where he interviews people in the automotive industry and California car culture. He is co-star of the SPEED channel show Car Warriors, Season 2', as car expert and lead technician. Fanshaw is consulting producer on the television series Car Chasers of CNBC prime. Though Fanshaw is part of the new guard in the auto after market industry, he is appreciative of those who paved the path for his generation. When asked to give autographs at a Hollywood car show, Fanshaw was in respectful awe of those with whom he shared the table. Looking over his shoulder at Ed "The Camfather" Iskendarian and Tommy Ivo, Fanshaw said, “This is pretty cool.”

Shift and Steer Media launched in November 2014 in partnership with Pete Chapouris, Aaron Hagar & Matt D'Andria. Shift and Steer Media describes itself as "New Media for the New Kind of Enthusiast." The podcast, available on iTunes and Stitcher.com, aims to take the listener to the big events, into the pits, next to the cars, and into the minds of the racers, builders, and owners.
