= Featherston =

Featherston is a surname of English origin, at least as old as the 12th century. The link with "Featherstone" is probably not traceable, but people researching both spellings (and others such as "de Fetherestanhalgh") contribute to the collection of pages in the website called "The Featherstone Society".

People having the surname include:

- C. Moxley Featherston (1914–1998), United States Tax Court judge
- Isaac Featherston (1813–1876), mid-19th century New Zealand politician (Colonial Secretary in 1861)
- J. P. Featherston (1830–1917), mayor of Ottawa 1874–1875
- Joseph Featherston (1843–1913), member of the Canadian House of Commons
- Katie Featherston (born 1982), American actress noted for playing the role of Katie in the Paranormal Activity series
- William Ralph Featherston (1848–1875), Christian hymnwriter
- Winfield S. Featherston (1821–1891), U.S. Representative from Mississippi and brigadier-general in the Confederate States Army during the American Civil War

== See also ==
- Featherstone (disambiguation)
