= Featherstone, Northumberland =

Village in Northumberland, England

Coordinates: 54.942°N 2.507°W

Featherstone
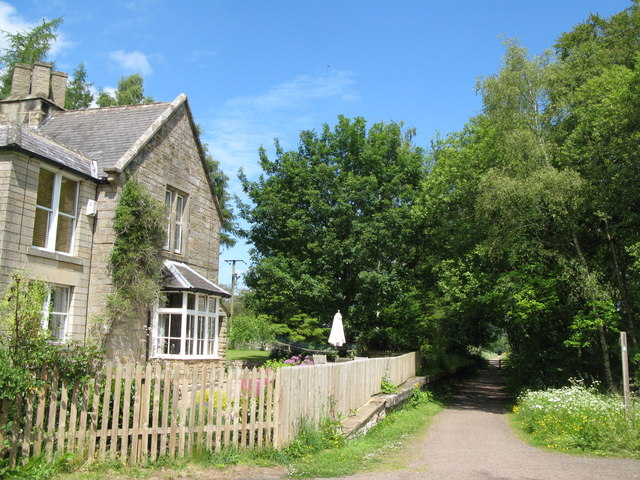
- Featherstone Station House

- Location within Northumberland
- Population: 138 (2011)
- OS grid reference: NY675610
- Unitary authority: Northumberland
- Ceremonial county: Northumberland
- Region: North East
- Country: England
- Sovereign state: United Kingdom
- Post town: HALTWHISTLE
- Postcode district: NE49
- Dialling code: 01434
- Police: Northumbria
- Fire: Northumberland
- Ambulance: North East
- UK Parliament: Hexham

Featherstone is a village in Northumberland, England about 17 miles (27 km) west of Hexham, and about 3 kilometres (2 mi) south of Greenhead.

== Featherstone Castle ==
Featherstone Castle was one of the castles defending the Tyne Gap. The castle, nestling beside the South Tyne as it turns up to its sources by Cross Fell, has been so rebuilt and re-used that it is hard to appreciate its military significance.

The legends and tales of the great pile of Featherstone are horrifying, as in one case they are founded on fact. Featherstone today is one of the most impressive castles in Northumberland. Its setting, close to the ford across the Tyne which it guarded, is encircled by the steep hills which rise from the river, and the bastion of Tynedale Fell. Sometime before the year 1200 there was a castle at Featherstone. There is mention of a Featherstonehaugh living there in 1212. In all its long history, only five families have lived and owned the castle of the Featherstonehaughs, the original owners, who lost their estates in the English Civil War, when like many Northumbrians they supported the cause of Charles I. Parliament sold the estates to the Earl of Carlisle, but, in 1711, a Featherstonehaugh who was mayor of Newcastle bought the estate of his ancestors. His son however, when he inherited an estate in Sussex, sold it to James Wallace, who eventually by marriage became a Hope-Wallace, and the Featherstone estate remained in the possession of the family until it became a school during the Second World War. It is now owned by Colonel John Clark, who has a long family connection with the district.

The L-shaped tower dates from 1330, and although extensive alterations were carried out during the ownership of the Hope-Wallace family, much that is old remains. There are a twelfth-century doorway "and thirteenth-century buttresses, which are part of the old "Hall house", and also a Jacobean postern door in a wonderful state of preservation. Some of the masonry bears Scottish craftsmen's marks. In the sixteenth century, Richard Featherstonehaugh was a chaplain to Catherine of Aragon and, because of his loyalty to this first wife of Henry VIII, he was executed. Although the family of Ridley were no doubt involved in the murder of Sir Albany Featherstonehaugh, and "took his life by the Deadmanshaw", the verse of poetry from "Marmion" is not genuine.

Hoot awa' lads, hoot awa'.
Hae ye heard how the Ridleys and Thirlwalls and a'
Ha' set upon Albany Featherstonehaugh.
And taken his life at the Deadmanshaw?
There was Willimoteswick,
And Hardriding Dick,
And Hughie o' Hawden and Will o' the Wa'
I canno' tell a', I canna' tell a',
And mony a mair that the Deil may knaw.

Sir Walter Scott, MARMION

Surtees composed the lines but persuaded Sir Walter Scott that it was a traditional ballad handed down through the generations. Scott accepted the verse as genuine and by now many people have come to believe that it is! Another dark chapter in the history of the Ridleys is connected with the family of Featherstonehaugh, and has become one of the best known legends. In Pinkingscleugh, where at one time dwelt a witch named Beardie Grey, who disappeared one stormy night after making the usual blood-thirsty prophecies, there can be seen at midnight a ghostly wedding party who were "set upon" by the Ridleys of Hardriding near Bardon Mill. The old house at Hardriding is still occupied, and there long ago a Hugh Ridley lived who was in love with the heiress of Feather-stone Castle. The heiress's father had other ideas about a bridegroom for his daughter, and the girl, whose name was Abigal, was married, on her part most reluctantly, to a distant cousin. The Ridleys no doubt knew what was taking place in the little chapel at Featherstone, and they waited until the bridal party went on a hunting expedition as part of the celebrations. In the dark glen of Pinkingscleugh, the Ridley clan waited until the bridal party appeared. The intention was to carry off the bride to Hardriding but, like most of the plans of those days, everything went wrong, and the unfortunate bride, who threw herself between her bridegroom and her lover, was killed and Hugh Ridley, realizing what had happened, according to the story, "put an end to his existence".

== Governance ==
Featherstone is in the parliamentary constituency of Hexham.
