= King's Remembrancer =

Judicial position in England and Wales

The King's Remembrancer (or Queen's Remembrancer) is an ancient judicial post in the legal system of England and Wales. Since the Lord Chancellor no longer sits as a judge, the Remembrancer is the oldest judicial position in continual existence. The post was created in 1154 by King Henry II as the chief official in the Exchequer Court, whose purpose was to "put the Lord Treasurer and the justices of that Court in remembrance of such things as are to be called on and dealt with for the King's benefit", a primary duty being to keep records of the taxes, paid and unpaid.

The first King's Remembrancer was Richard of Ilchester, a senior servant of the Crown and later Bishop of Winchester. The King's Remembrancer continued to sit in the Court of the Exchequer until its abolition in 1882. The post of King's Remembrancer is held by the Senior Master of the King's Bench Division of the High Court.

== Quit Rents ceremonies ==
The Exchequer Court is reconstituted every year for the three ancient ceremonies of the ‘Rendering of the Quit Rents to the Crown’ by the City of London at the Royal Courts of Justice.

The oldest dates from 1211, where the City pays service for two pieces of land, of which the oldest is The Moors near Bridgnorth in Shropshire, for which the City must pay one axe and one billhook.

The second oldest has been made, entered in the Great Roll of the Exchequer, since 1235, for ‘The Forge’ in Tweezer's Alley, just south of St Clement Danes, near the Strand in London, for which the City must pay six horseshoes and 61 horseshoe nails—these are over 550 years old, since after being rendered to the King's Remembrancer they are preserved in his office, and with the permission of the Crown they are loaned to the Corporation of London to be rendered again the following year.

These two quits are paid together as one ceremony, during which a black-and-white chequered cloth is spread out—it is from this that the word "Exchequer" derives—combined with the introduction to the Remembrancer of the City’s newly elected sheriffs. The Comptroller and Solicitor of the City of London presents the horseshoes and nails and counts them out to the Remembrancer who then pronounces “Good number”. The axe and billhook are tested by the King's Remembrancer by taking a hazel stick, bending it over the billhook to leave a mark, and then splitting it in two with the axe. This practice stems from the creation of tally sticks where a mark was made on a stick with a blunt knife for each payment counted. When payment was complete the stick was split down the middle, leaving each party with half of the marked stick and creating a receipt (or foil and counter-foil). After the knives are tested the Remembrancer pronounces “Good service”.

The third quit rent dates from 1327, and is for £11 in regard to the reserved interest of the Crown for the ‘town of Southwark’. In that year, the City was granted its fourth-oldest Royal Charter to acquire Southwark from Edward III for this annual payment. It was specifically retained by Edward VI in the 1550 charter to the City, which extended its jurisdiction over the outlying parts of Southwark. This quit is rendered by the Foreman of the City’s Court Leet Jury of the ‘Town and Borough of Southwark’, commonly known as the Guildable Manor, which is the area as defined in 1327. The continuation of this body is sanctioned under the Administration of Justice Act 1977. In recent years, the ceremony has taken place at the guild church of the Guildable Manor, St George the Martyr in Southwark, and latterly at St Mary Magdalen in Bermondsey. The sum of £11 is rendered onto the Exchequer Cloth in the form of crowns (five-shilling pieces, equivalent to 25 new pence), which remain legal tender. The assembly counts aloud as each quit of £1 (i.e., each stack of four crowns) is laid upon the table by the Foreman of the Town and Borough of Southwark. Once all have been counted out, the Foreman proclaims “I quit the rent thus!” The Remembrancer then re-counts the coinage, before pronouncing “Good service”. The ceremony is witnessed by the Clerk of the City’s Chamberlain’s Court and the manor jurors to note that the payment has been made. As with the other Quit Rents, the crowns are returned.

== Trial of the Pyx ==
The Trial of the Pyx is a ceremony dating from 1249, formerly held in the Exchequer Court, now in Goldsmiths' Hall. The King's Remembrancer swears in a jury of 26 Goldsmiths who then count, weigh and otherwise measure a sample of 88,000 gold coins produced by the Royal Mint. The term "Pyx" refers to the name of the box in which the coins are kept.

== Forest of Dean ==
In 1688, King James II directed the King's Remembrancer to appoint commissioners to supervise the planting of trees in the Forest of Dean. The Forest was an important source of iron, coal and timber to the Monarch, but had been neglected during the Commonwealth.

== Other responsibilities ==
The King's Remembrancer is responsible for nomination of the high sheriffs to each county of England and Wales (except Cornwall, who are selected by the Duke of Cornwall (i.e. the eldest son of the sovereign), and Greater Manchester, Lancashire and Merseyside, who are selected by the Duke of Lancaster (i.e. the sovereign)), via the Pricking ceremony.

The Remembrancer presents the Lord Mayor of London to the Lord Chief Justice, Master of the Rolls and other High Court judges at the Royal Courts of Justice on Lord Mayor's Day.

The King's Remembrancer presents newly appointed Sheriffs of the City with a Writ of Approbation from the monarch, sealed with the Great Silver Seal of the Exchequer. This takes place at the same time as the Quit Rents.

== List of Remembrancers ==
- Richard of Ilchester (appointed 1154)
- John Troutbeck and Thomas Daniel of Frodsham (appointed 1447)
- John FitzHerbert (d. 1502), father-in-law of John Port, Justice of the King's Bench
- John Jessop, 22 April 1513 – 21 April 1514
- William Forman, 22 April 1538 – 21 April 1540
- Sir Christopher More, 1542–1549
- Thomas Saunders, 1549–1565
- Henry Fanshawe, 1565–1568
- Thomas Fanshawe, 1568–1601
- Sir Henry Fanshawe, 1601–1616
- Christopher Hatton, 1616–1619
- Sir Thomas Fanshawe 1619–1641
- Richard Fanshawe 1641 – c. 1642 (deprived of office by Parliament as a Royalist)
- Humphrey Salwey, 28 September 1644 – 6 December 1652
- John Dodington, 29 July 1658 – c. 1659
- Thomas Fanshawe, 1st Viscount Fanshawe, 7 August 1660 – 26 March 1665
- Thomas Fanshawe, 2nd Viscount Fanshawe, 26 March 1665 – 19 May 1674
- Vere Bertie, 19 May 1674 – 4 June 1675
- Henry Ayloffe, 4 June 1674 – 13 September 1708
- Henry Stevens, 23 October 1708 – 25 June 1709. Temporarily appointed by the Barons of Exchequer while the rights of Charles Fanshawe, 4th Viscount Fanshawe and Simon Fanshawe to the office were settled; Charles, who had the next reversion, was a Jacobite and would not subscribe to the oaths required
- Simon Fanshawe, 5th Viscount Fanshawe, 13 September 1708 – 23 October 1716 (appointment retroactive)
- Samuel Masham, 1st Baron Masham, 23 October 1716 – 16 October 1758
- Samuel Masham, 2nd Baron Masham, 16 October 1758 – 14 June 1776
- Felton Hervey and his son Felton Lionel Hervey, 14 June 1776 – 9 September 1785
- Edward James Eliot, 4 October 1785 – 20 September 1797
- Thomas Steele, 2 November 1797 – 8 December 1823
- Henry William Vincent, 18 December 1823 – 1 February 1858
- William Henry Walton, 1858–1874
- Sir William Frederick Pollock, 2nd Baronet, 1874–1886
- George Frederick Pollock, 1886 – December 1901
- Robert St John Fitzwalter Butler, 16th Baron Dunboyne, December 1901 – 1905
- James Robert Mellor, 1905–1912
- Sir John Macdonell, 1912–1920
- Thomas Willes Chitty, 1920–1927
- Sir George A. Bonner, 1927–1937
- Ernest Arthur Jelf, 1937–1943
- W. Valentine Ball, 1943–1947
- Sir Percy Reginald Simner, 1947–1950
- Sir Frederick Arnold-Baker, 1951–1957
- Sir Richard Frank Burnand, 1958–1960?
- Sir Anthony Highmore King, 1960–1962
- Claude Herbert Grundy, 1962–1965
- B.A. Harwood, 1965–1970
- Sir (William) Russell Lawrence, 1970–1975
- Sir Jack Jacob, 1975–1980
- John Ritchie, 1980–1982
- John Bullen Elton, 1982–1983
- J. R. Bickford-Smith, 1983–1987
- Ian Warren, 1988–1990±
- Keith Topley, 1990–1996
- Robert Lockley Turner, 1996 – 1 October 2007
- Steven Dixon Whitaker, 2 October 2007 – February 2014 (resigned from office after misconduct was proven in his work diary scheduling)
- John Leslie, February 2014 – 19 October 2014 (Acting Queen's Remembrancer pending appointment of a permanent Remembrancer)
- Barbara Fontaine, 20 October 2014 – September 2023
- Jeremy David Cook, 16 September 2023 – present

== See also ==
- King's and Lord Treasurer's Remembrancer – successor to the Queen's/King's Remembrancer of the Court of Exchequer in Scotland
- City Remembrancer – a senior officer of the City of London Corporation

== Citations ==
- FANSHAWE, Henry I (c.1506-68), of London.
- HENRY FANSHAWE, QUEEN'S REMEMBRANCER.
- HATTON, Christopher II (c.1581-1619), of Clay Hall, Barking, Essex and Kirby Hall, Northants.
