= Thomas Fanshawe, 2nd Viscount Fanshawe =

Irish peer and Member of Parliament

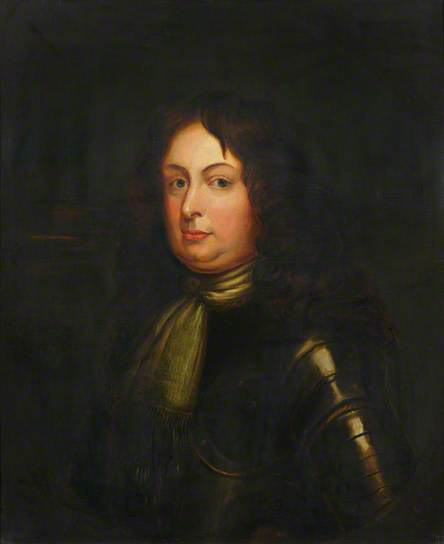
Thomas Fanshawe, 2nd Viscount Fanshawe of Dromore

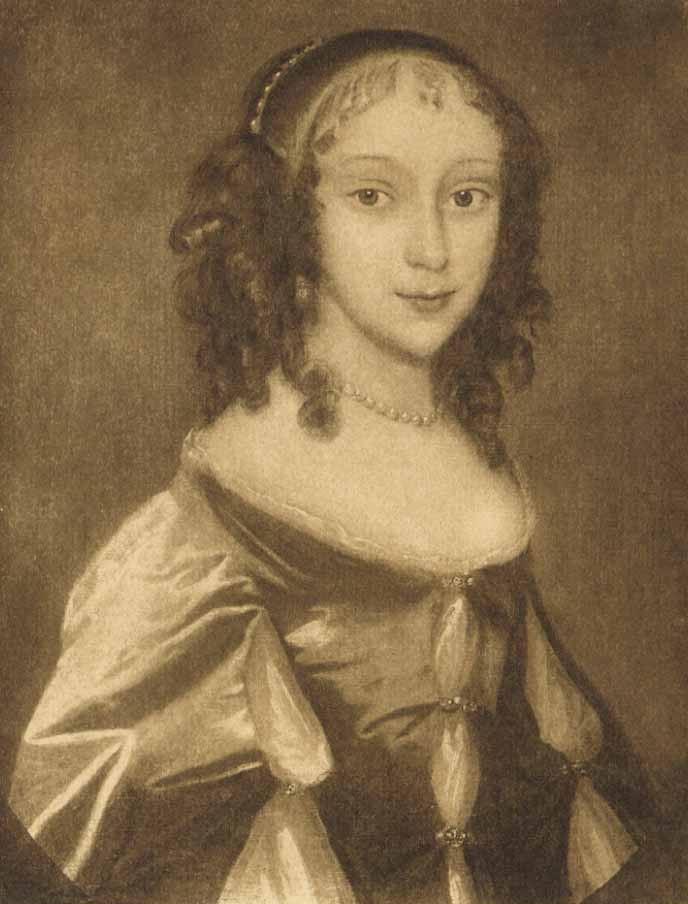
Katherine Ferrers at the time of her wedding—the only known portrait of her.

Thomas Fanshawe, 2nd Viscount Fanshawe KB (1632–1674) of Ware Park, Hertfordshire was an Irish peer and Member of Parliament. He was born to Thomas Fanshawe, 1st Viscount Fanshawe by his second wife Elizabeth Cockayne, the daughter of Sir William Cockayne, who served as the Lord Mayor of London in 1619.

== Biography ==
By the time Thomas was ten years old, the English Civil War had begun between Parliament and King Charles I over whose authority took precedence over the other. As staunch Royalists, the Fanshawe family sent many members of the family, including Fanshawe's father, to fight for the king.

While his father was away, Thomas's uncle, Sir Simon Fanshawe, married Katherine Walter, the widow of Knighton Ferrers, who was a wealthy neighboring landowner. As a result, Sir Simon gained custody of the dead gentleman's daughter, Katherine (d. 1660). To solidify a union between the two families, Sir Simon arranged for Katherine to marry Thomas in 1648. According to popular legend, Katherine became the "Wicked Lady", a female highwayman who terrorised the county of Hertfordshire.

Thomas would afterwards go on to serve in the Second English Civil War. For his service to the new king, Charles II, he was created a Knight of the Bath in 1661 upon the Restoration and became an active member for Hertford in the Cavalier Parliament from 1661 to his death.

== Political career ==
Upon his father's death in 1665, Sir Thomas succeeded his father in the Peerage of Ireland as the Viscount Fanshawe of Dromore and as King's Remembrancer of the Exchequer. During his political career, Lord Fanshawe served as Lord Lieutenant during the Second Anglo-Dutch War. During his tenure as Lord Lieutenant, Lord Fanshawe sent to the gaol several men who were Parliamentarians during the English Civil War. When he was reproached by Sir Harbottle Grimston, Lord Fanshawe replied that Grimston 'has as deep a hand in the late horrid and bloody affair as any man' in bitter reference to the baronet's past and present Parliamentarian sympathies. Lord Clarendon later wrote to Grimston deploring the 'unwarrantable folly' of his old friend Fanshawe adding that his 'passion and animosity did the king no service'.

Parliamentarians were not the only focus of Lord Fanshawe's "passion and animosity", however. In one of his only completely recorded speeches in the Parliament, he attacked the Protestant Dissenters emphasizing their part in the rise of Oliver Cromwell, accusing them of taking part in the dethronement and execution of the king. It begins as follows:

"If these tender consciences were so good as is pretended to, then they should live without offense to God and men; but what villainies did these men commit when they had the power in their hands is most notorious. Let us not...stand in fear of their number, of with there is so much noise, but let the laws be put in execution against them and they will soon be brought under, as he had the experience of some persons in Hertfordshire who frequented unlawful meetings, and, upon the execution of the laws, they have conformed and come in good order to church."

Lord Fanshawe also joined the committee of Lords and Members of Parliament that passed the Conventicles Act 1670 furthering the persecution of such religious sects as the Puritans and the Quakers.

== Personal life ==
After the death of his first wife, either from childbirth or, if the legend is true, the mortal wounds inflicted upon her in one of her latest and final exploits as the infamous highway woman, Lord Fanshawe married Sarah Evelyn, daughter of Sir John Evelyn and cousin of the noted diarist John Evelyn. By her Lord Fanshawe had a son that he named Evelyn Fanshawe, who would succeed him as the 3rd Viscount Fanshawe of Dromore after his own untimely death in 1674 as a result of apoplexy. This was a hereditary medical condition that both his father and grandfather died from as well.

Peerage of Ireland
Preceded by Thomas Fanshawe	Viscount Fanshawe; 1665–1674	Succeeded by Evelyn Fanshawe
