= Featherstones =

Former department store group in Kent

- Company type: Private
- Industry: Retail
- Founded: 19th century
- Founder: John Thomas Featherstone
- Defunct: 1981
- Fate: Closed
- Headquarters: Rochester, Kent, England
- Number of locations: Chatham, Rochester, Sittingbourne, Sheerness, Gravesend, Maidstone, Canterbury
- Area served: Medway Towns, Kent
- Key people: Chris Featherstone; Sheila Featherstone
- Products: Drapery, household goods, furniture

Featherstones was a department store business based in the Medway towns of Kent, England, originally operating in Chatham and Rochester and later expanding to include Sittingbourne, Sheerness, Gravesend, Maidstone, and Canterbury. Founded in the 19th century, the company developed from a drapery shop into a prominent regional retailer and remained a fixture of the local High Street until its closure in 1981.

== History ==
In 1901, John Thomas Featherstone opened a store on Chatham High Street, occupying Nos. 365–377, with Nos. 373–375 serving as the main office. The shop promoted the then-unusual concept of selling goods on credit without charging interest. Originally a drapery-style store, it gradually expanded into a full-service retailer offering a wide range of household goods, with early advertisements describing it as a “Universal Provider.”

In 1910, Featherstones was incorporated as Featherstones’ Limited, formalizing the business as a private limited company in Rochester.

By the 1930s, Featherstones had opened branches in Rochester High Street, Bell Road in Sittingbourne, The Broadway in Sheerness, Palace Street in Canterbury, Parrock Street in Gravesend, and Earl Street in Maidstone.

During the 1970s Chris Featherstone, a member of the family raced sportscars, including Formula 5000.

The business continued to run until 1981, when the stores were closed and the business changed its focus onto property. Although the buildings were later repurposed for other businesses, they remained partly in family ownership, with Chris Featherstone owning No. 351, and Nos. 365–377 being Grade II listed. Sheila Featherstone oversaw the conservation and refurbishment of No. 351.
