= Sir Richard Fanshawe, 1st Baronet =

17th-century English diplomat, politician, poet, and translator

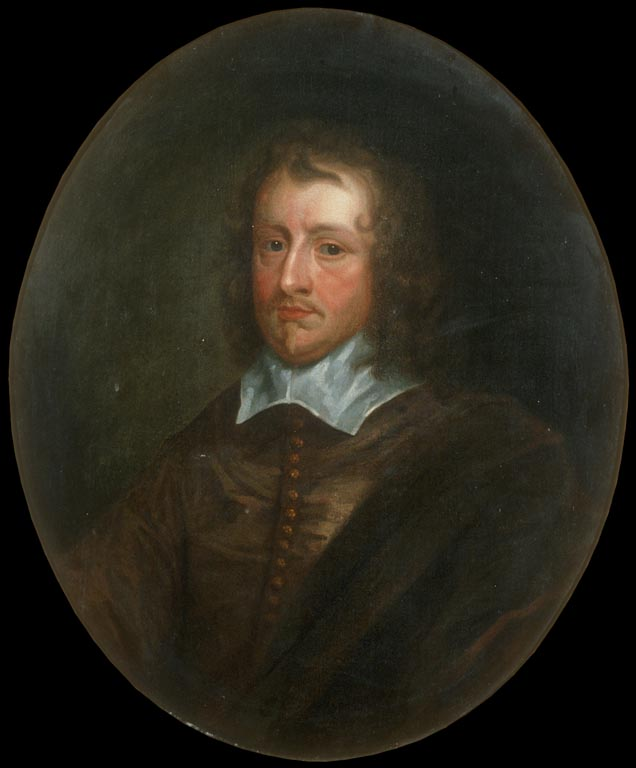
Richard Fanshawe

Sir Richard Fanshawe, 1st Baronet, PC (June 1608 – 16 June 1666) was an English poet and translator. He was a diplomat and politician who sat in the House of Commons from 1661 to 1666. During the English Civil War he supported the Royalist cause and served Charles II of England in battle and in exile.

== Early life ==
Fanshawe was the fourth and youngest son of Sir Henry Fanshawe, of Ware Park, Hertfordshire and his wife Elizabeth Smythe, daughter of Thomas Smythe, of Ostenhanger Kent and was baptised at Ware on 12 June 1608. His father, who was Remembrancer of the Exchequer, died in 1616.

Fanshawe was admitted at Jesus College, Cambridge in November 1623 and was admitted to Inner Temple on 22 January 1626. He travelled on the Continent, and in 1635 was Secretary to the Embassy at the Court of Spain. In 1638, he was Chargé d'Affaires there. He was an accomplished linguist, whose knowledge of "modern languages" like Spanish and Italian is said to have been a great advantage to him in his diplomatic career.

== Civil War ==
When the Civil War broke out, Fanshawe sided with the King. He was Secretary of War to the Prince of Wales in 1644 and in 1648 had credentials for Spain, where he was sent to obtain money for the cause. From 1648 to 1650, he was Treasurer of the Navy under Prince Rupert. He was created a baronet on 2 September 1650, and soon afterwards was Secretary of State in Scotland to the young King Charles II. He was captured at the Battle of Worcester on 3 September 1651. He was knighted at Breda in April 1660, and made Latin Secretary and Master of Requests for King Charles when in Holland.

== Restored monarchy ==
After the Restoration Fanshawe held various appointments. He represented James, Duke of York at the Coronation on 23 April 1661. In 1661 he was elected Member of Parliament for Cambridge University for the Cavalier Parliament and sat until his death. From 1662 to 1666, he was Ambassador to Portugal and from 1664 to 1666 was also ambassador to Spain. In 1666 Fanshawe was making preparations to return to England when he died suddenly at Siete Chimeneas, his house in Madrid at the age of 58.

== Memorials ==
His body was returned to England from Spain. He was initially buried at Allhallows, Hertford, and a few years later removed to St Mary's Church, Ware, where there is a monument (a marble aedicule).

A portrait of Richard Fanshawe is on display with other portraits of the family at Valence House Museum in east London.

== Works ==
Fanshawe translated Giovanni Battista Guarini's Il pastor fido, Selected Parts of Horace, and The Lusiad of Camoens, the first English translation of the latter work (circulated from 1655 or earlier).

== Family ==
Fanshawe married at Wolvercot, Oxfordshire on 18 May 1644, his second cousin Anne Harrison daughter of Sir John Harrison, of Ball's Park, Ware and Margaret Fanshawe, daughter of Robert Fanshawe of Fanshawe Gate in Holmesfield, Derbyshire. His wife, described as "devoted and able", wrote memoirs of her own life. They had fourteen children, but only five reached adulthood. The baronetcy became extinct on the death of their son Richard.

His brother Thomas was created Viscount Fanshawe.

Parliament of England
Preceded by Thomas Crouch; William Montagu	Member of Parliament for Cambridge University with Thomas Crouch; 1661–1666	Succeeded by Thomas Crouch; Sir Charles Wheler
Diplomatic posts
Preceded by Thomas Maynard as Agent	English Envoy to Portugal; 1661	Succeeded by The Earl of Sandwich
Preceded by The Earl of Sandwich	English Envoy to Portugal; 1662–1665	Succeeded by Sir Robert Southwell
Vacant Title last held by George Fisher	English Ambassador to Spain; 1664–1666	Succeeded by The Earl of Sandwich
Baronetage of Ireland
New creation	Baronet (of Donamore); 1650–1666	Succeeded by Richard Fanshawe
