= Featherstone, Virginia =

Unincorporated community in Virginia, US

Coordinates: 38°38′06″N 77°15′50″W

Featherstone is an unincorporated community in Prince William County, in the U.S. state of Virginia.
