= Featherstone (rock band) =

- Origin: Gothenburg, Sweden
- Genres: Rock, hard rock
- Years active: 2012–present
- Label: AOR Heaven
- Members: Lars Boden; Niklas Osterlund; Rikard Quist; Jon Wilde
- Website: http://featherstone.se/

Featherstone is a rock band from Sweden. The band belongs to the melodic hard rock genre with roots in the 70's and 80's.

== History ==
The band was founded in 2012 in Gothenburg, Sweden by songwriter/multi-instrumentalist/producer Rikard Quist. After writing for and recording with several bands including Gypsy Rose, Don Patrol, Last Autumn's Dream, White Wolf and Bangalore Choir he decided to focus on his own music.

Together with singer Lars Boden and drummer Niklas Österlund including British lyricist Jon Wilde the band got complete.

The Featherstone debut album Northern Rumble was written, recorded and produced by Rikard Quist. The final mix was made by engineer Martin Kronlund.

== Members ==
- Lars Boden: lead vocals, backing vocals
- Niklas Osterlund: drums
- Rikard Quist: guitars, bass, keyboards, hammond organ, backing vocals
- Jon Wilde: lyrics

With guest appearances:

- Paulo Mendonca: guitars
- Christian Svensson: guitars
- Peter Hallin: guitars
- Anders Borjesson: guitars
- Annica Svensson: vocals

== Discography ==
- Albums
  - Northern Rumble (2016)
    - Track list:
    1. I Need Myself The Most
    2. Freedom Call
    3. Leave Me Be
    4. Look Into My Eyes
    5. Hole In My Heart
    6. Silhouettes On The Shade
    7. Hold On To Love
    8. Scandinavian Rose
    9. Fear Me, Save Me
    10. Part Of Me
