= Viscount Fanshawe =

Viscount Fanshawe, of Dromore, was a title in the Peerage of Ireland. It was created on 5 September 1661 for Sir Thomas Fanshawe for his services to the House of Stuart during the English Civil War. He previously served as Member of Parliament for Lancaster and Hertford as well as king's Remembrancer of the Exchequer, an office that had been held by the Fanshawe family since Elizabethan times. The title became extinct after the death of the fifth viscount in 1716.

== Viscounts Fanshawe (1661) ==
- Thomas Fanshawe, 1st Viscount Fanshawe (c. 1596–1665)
- Thomas Fanshawe, 2nd Viscount Fanshawe (1632–1674)
- Evelyn Fanshawe, 3rd Viscount Fanshawe (1669–1687)
- Charles Fanshawe, 4th Viscount Fanshawe (1643-1710)
- Simon Fanshawe, 5th Viscount Fanshawe (1648–1716)

== See also ==
- Fanshawe baronets
