= James Featherstone (footballer) =

English footballer and agent

Personal information
- Full name: James Lee Featherstone
- Date of birth: 12 November 1979 (age 46)
- Place of birth: Yeadon, England
- Position: Forward

Youth career
- Blackburn Rovers

Senior career*
Years	Team	Apps	(Gls)
1998	Scunthorpe United	1	(0)
- Harrogate Town
- Ossett Town
- * Club domestic league appearances and goals

James Lee Featherstone (born 12 November 1979) is a footballer, who later became a football agent.

== Football player ==
Featherstone ("Feathers"), started his career as a schoolboy with his hometown club of Leeds United FC, having come through the ranks with his local club, Otley Express, and Leeds City Schoolboys. At 14, with the Jack Walker millions being poured into the youth system at Blackburn Rovers, Featherstone was recruited from their Yorkshire rivals by Kenny Dalglish.

Featherstone did not make any first team appearances for Blackburn Rovers, but was a prominent member of their youth teams. He played there with Damien Duff and David Dunn. After many changes at Blackburn, despite winning the golden boot in the Milk Cup competition in Ireland, and many good performances at youth and reserve level, he was transferred to Scunthorpe United for an undisclosed amount. He made one appearance in the Football League for Scunthorpe.

In later years Featherstone played centre forward in non-league football with teams such as Harrogate Town and Ossett Town.

== Business career ==
Following his football career Featherstone entered investment banking, most recently with Investec Bank Plc.

Featherstone currently represents many top-flight players and is involved in high-profile football deals. He is a regular on Sky Sports giving commentary and insight into the world of Sports Management. He also holds numerous non-executive directorships on the boards of publicly listed companies in the UK.

Featherstone is an active agent within the European football market and is especially known for his presence in Italy. He is the only English intermediary registered as a licensed agent with the FIGC and CONI (Italian sporting governing bodies) cementing him as a firm favourite for Players for moves between the UK and Italy.
