= William Ashton (MP) =

English Member of Parliament

William Ashton (1575–1646) was an English Member of Parliament for Hertford in 1621–1625 and Appleby in 1626 and 1628.

He had considerable court connections, including Robert Cecil, the Treasurer, and his son William Cecil.

In retirement he purchased the grant of a large part of the Royal forest of Feckenham as it was disafforested and an estate in Hertfordshire.

Despite his court connections, he was active in support of Parliament in the English Civil War, especially in the Middlesex County Committee. He also became a Presbyterian Elder.
