= Charles Fanshawe, 4th Viscount Fanshawe =

Irish Peer and Member of the House of Commons

The Right Honourable The Viscount Fanshawe
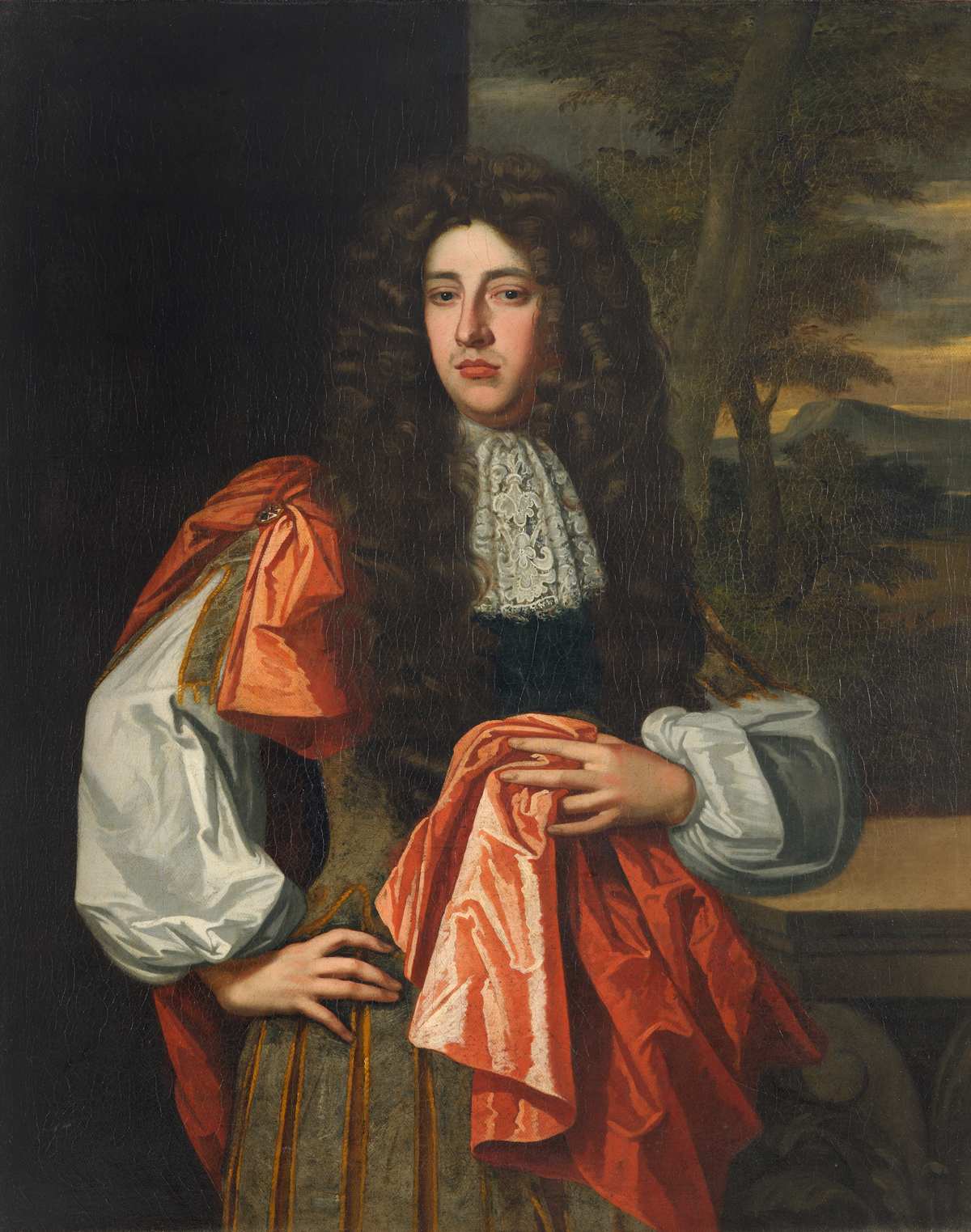

Personal details
- Born: Charles Fanshawe; 6 February 1643
- Died: 28 March 1710 (aged 67) Suffolk, England
- Occupation: politician

Charles Fanshawe, 4th Viscount Fanshawe (1643–1710) was an Irish Peer and Member of the House of Commons. He was the third surviving son of Thomas Fanshawe, 1st Viscount Fanshawe and his second wife, Elizabeth Cockayne.

== Career ==
Shortly after completing his studies at King's College, Cambridge, Fanshawe became involved in the 1667 peace talks ending the Second Anglo-Dutch War, which were held at Breda.

He later received a commission, serving as a captain in the regiment of Lord Alington in 1678. From 1681 to 1685 he was a diplomatic envoy to Portugal.

== Political life ==
On 10 October 1687 he became the 4th Viscount Fanshawe of Dromore, succeeding his nephew, Evelyn Fanshawe, the 3rd Viscount Fanshawe.

As an Irish Peer, he was allowed to serve in the House of Commons of England.

In 1689, as a Tory, he represented the Mitchell in the Convention Parliament, which was called after the Glorious Revolution of 1688. He refused to take an oath of loyalty to newly crowned King William III and Queen Mary II and as a result was removed from Parliament.

In 1692, Parliament declared him a Jacobite and he was briefly imprisoned in the Tower of London for high treason.

== Death ==
Fanshawe died in his Suffolk home on 28 March 1710 and was buried in Ware.

He had no known children. Upon his death, his younger brother, Simon Fanshawe, succeeded him as the 5th Viscount Fanshawe of Dromore.

Peerage of Ireland
| Preceded by Evelyn Fanshawe | Viscount Fanshawe; 1687–1710 | Succeeded by Simon Fanshawe |
