= Foreign-born population of the United Kingdom =

View source data.
Foreign born population of the United Kingdom by country of birth and nationality, 2004–2018

The foreign-born population of the United Kingdom includes immigrants from a wide range of countries who are resident in the United Kingdom. In the period January to December 2017, there were groups from 25 foreign countries that were estimated to consist of at least 100,000 individuals residing in the UK (people born in Poland, India, Pakistan, Romania, Ireland, Germany, Bangladesh, Italy, South Africa, China, Nigeria, Lithuania, France, Spain, the United States, the Philippines, Sri Lanka, Portugal, Australia, Kenya, Zimbabwe, Jamaica, Ghana, Latvia and Somalia).

The foreign-born population increased from about 5.3 million in 2004 to 10.7 million in 2021. In the decade leading up to 2018, the number of non-EU migrants outnumbered EU migrants while the number of EU migrants increased more rapidly. EU citizens were noted to be less likely to become British citizens than non-EU migrants. The Office for National Statistics' provisional estimate, released in November 2025 on migration in the year ending (YE) June 2025, stated that long-term net migration in the year ending (YE) June 2025 was 204,000: non-EU+ nationals at 383,000 net migration, British nationals at -109,000, and EU+ nationals at -70,000.

== Size of the foreign-born population ==
Foreign-born population in England, Wales and Northern Ireland in 2021

Percentage born to foreign-born mothers in England and Wales in 2021

At the time of the UK census conducted in April 2001, 8.3 per cent of the country's population were foreign-born. This was substantially less than that of major immigration countries such as Australia (23 per cent), Canada (19.3 per cent) and the USA (12.3 per cent). In 2005, the foreign-born population was estimated at 9.1 per cent, compared to a European Union average of 8.6 per cent. The 2011 census recorded 7,337,139 foreign-born residents in England, corresponding to 13.8 per cent of the population. The foreign-born population of Wales was recorded as 167,871 (5.5 per cent), Scotland's as 369,284 (7 per cent) and Northern Ireland's as 119,186 (6.6 per cent), making the total foreign-born population of the UK 7,993,480. Figures for each census since 1951 are given in the table below.

A 2010 estimate for the whole of the UK showed that 4.76 million people (7.7 per cent) were born outside the EU and 2.24 million (3.6 per cent) were born in another EU member state.

The Office for National Statistics produces annual estimates of the size of the UK population by country of birth, based on the Annual Population Survey. The estimates for 2018 showed that 9.3 million people (14 per cent of the usual resident population) were born abroad.

According to the 2021–2022 United Kingdom censuses the foreign-born population was 10.7 million or 16% of the total United Kingdom, a 34% increase over the 2011 census.

Census	Foreign-born population	% increase over previous decade	% of total population
1951	2,118,600	Steady	4.2
1961	2,573,500	21.5▲	4.9
1971	3,190,300	24.0▲	5.8
1981	3,429,100	7.5▲	6.2
1991	3,835,400	11.8▲	6.7
2001	4,896,600	27.7▲	8.3
2011	7,993,480	63.0▲	12.7
2021/22	10,737,501	34.0▲	16.0

The COVID-19 pandemic saw a temporary reduction in net migration. The reduction in net migration peaked at 35,000 in the year ending (YE) September 2020. This was due to a temporary reduction in immigration numbers, as in the year ending (YE) September 2020, immigration was 606,000, which was lower compared to 793,000 in the year ending (YE) September 2019. Emigration was speculated during the pandemic to have massively increased; however, emigration actually slightly decreased in the year ending (YE) September 2020 to 571,000, from 591,000 in the year ending (YE) September 2019. Subsequent analysis of the impact of the pandemic on population statistics generated by the Labour Force Survey (LFS) suggests that "LFS-based estimates are likely to significantly overstate the change in the non-UK national population". Payroll data shows that the number of EU workers fell by 7 per cent between October–December 2019 and October–December 2020.

According to the Migration Observatory at the University of Oxford:

The different sources of data on migration and migrants in the UK are not always consistent with each other. For example, from 2017 to 2019, the estimated number of EU-born residents as measured by the Annual Population Survey declined, while the International Passenger Survey (LTIM data) estimated that the net migration of EU citizens was still positive. There are various reasons for this, including differences in how data sources define migrants; known uncertainty in the estimates, which come with margins of error; and unknown sources of error, such as that arising from the fact that not everyone agrees to participate in official surveys. This means that it is often sensible to look at the overall picture across several data sources, rather than focusing on short-term changes in a single dataset. ONS has identified several limitations in current data sources, and is currently developing new approaches to producing migration statistics to address them. This is likely to lead to substantial changes in official migration data between now and 2023. The foreign-born will include some people who are born abroad to UK citizen parents. However, it is usually still the preferred definition when using data on the migrant population, and especially change in the population over time. This is because migrants who acquire UK citizenship are excluded from data on the non-UK citizen population, and rates of naturalisation vary significantly depending on migrants’ country of origin. Moreover, data on non-UK citizens also include many UK-born children of migrants who have themselves never migrated.

=== Population structure ===
Population pyramid of the foreign born population of England and Wales (unless otherwise specified)

1971 (Great Britain)

1981 (Great Britain)

1991

2001

2011

2021

=== Year of arrival ===
Year of arrival by year grouping of current non-UK born residents in England and Wales in 2021

Year of arrival for non-UK born residents in England and Wales in 2021

Year of arrival into England and Wales
Year	Total number	Proportional make up
before 1951	74,538	1%
1951 to 1960	233,840	2%
1961 to 1970	540,232	5%
1971 to 1980	554,640	5%
1981 to 1990	580,298	6%
1991 to 2000	1,089,094	11%
2001 to 2010	2,696,364	27%
2011 to 2013	879,515	8.8%
2014 to 2016	1,255,036	12.5%
2017 to 2019	1,434,823	14.3%
2020 to 2021	679,592	6.8%
2011 to 2021	4,248,966	42%
Total	10,017,972	100%

== Countries of origin ==
The table below lists the places of birth of UK residents according to the 2001 Census, as reported by the Organisation for Economic Co-operation and Development. The table also lists population estimates of the foreign-born population for the top 60 foreign countries of birth in the period January 2010 to December 2010, published by the Office for National Statistics.

In 2001, the five most common foreign countries of birth were Ireland, India, Pakistan, Germany and the United States respectively. In 2010, the most common foreign countries of birth were India, Poland (up from 18th in 2001), Pakistan, Ireland and Germany, respectively. While those born in Germany constitute one of the UK's largest foreign-born groups, many are British nationals who were born in Germany to British military personnel based there. The United States dropped to eighth place behind South Africa and Bangladesh, despite growth in the size of the U.S.-born population.

The period between 2001 and 2010 saw significant change in the UK's foreign-born population. In particular, the 2004 and 2007 enlargements of the European Union have led to mass migration from Poland, Bulgaria, Latvia, Romania, Slovakia and Lithuania. The number of Poland-born people resident in the UK increased from 60,711 in 2001 to an estimated 532,000 in the year to December 2010, whilst the population born in Lithuania increased from 4,363 to an estimated 87,000. The most significant decrease in a foreign-born population resident in the UK between 2001 and 2010 is in the number of those originating from Ireland. Whilst 533,901 people born in Ireland were resident in the UK in 2001, this is estimated to have declined to 405,000 by 2010.

	Country of birth	Population (2001 census)	Population (2015 UN estimate)	Corresponding article(s)
	United Kingdom	53,923,642	56,254,898	British people; Cornish people, English people, Manx people, Northern Irish people, Scottish people, Welsh people
1	India	467,634	776,603	Indians in the United Kingdom
2	Poland	60,711	703,050	Poles in the United Kingdom
3	Pakistan	321,167	540,495	Pakistanis in the United Kingdom
4	Ireland	537,108	503,288	Irish migration to Great Britain
5	Germany	266,136	322,220	Germans in the United Kingdom
6	Bangladesh	154,362	230,143	Bangladeshis in the United Kingdom
7	South Africa	141,405	218,732	South Africans in the United Kingdom
8	Nigeria	88,378	216,268	Nigerians in the United Kingdom
9	United States	158,434	212,150	Americans in the United Kingdom
10	China	51,078	182,628	Chinese in the United Kingdom
11	Jamaica	146,401	172,829	Jamaicans in the United Kingdom
12	Italy	107,244	151,790	Italians in the United Kingdom
13	Kenya	129,633	151,073	Kenyans in the United Kingdom
14	France	96,281	149,872	French in the United Kingdom
15	Philippines	40,118	139,570	Filipinos in the United Kingdom
16	Sri Lanka	67,938	138,752	Sri Lankans in the United Kingdom
17	Australia	107,871	135,786	Australians in the United Kingdom
18	Zimbabwe	49,524	132,942	Zimbabweans in the United Kingdom
19	Hong Kong	96,445	119,990	Hong Kongers in the United Kingdom
20	Lithuania	4,363	116,861	Lithuanians in the United Kingdom
21	Somalia	43,532	110,775	Somalis in the United Kingdom
22	Ghana	56,112	102,837	Ghanaians in the United Kingdom
23	Turkey	54,079	100,956	Turks in the United Kingdom
24	Portugal	36,555	98,967	Portuguese in the United Kingdom
25	Spain	54,482	91,179	Spaniards in the United Kingdom
26	Iran	42,494	91,087	Iranians in the United Kingdom
27	Romania	7,631	89,402	Romanians in the United Kingdom
28	Canada	72,518	86,415	Canadians in the United Kingdom
29	Cyprus	77,673	84,815	Cypriots in the United Kingdom
30	Iraq	32,236	80,939	Iraqis in the United Kingdom
31	Malaysia	49,886	75,182	Malaysians in the United Kingdom
32	Netherlands	40,438	68,489	Dutch in the United Kingdom
33	Afghanistan	14,875	68,256	Afghans in the United Kingdom
34	Slovakia	5,273	67,781	Slovaks in the United Kingdom
35	New Zealand	58,286	67,276	New Zealanders in the United Kingdom
36	Latvia	4,275	66,046	Latvians in the United Kingdom
37	Uganda	55,213	65,447	Ugandans in the United Kingdom
38	Hungary	13,159	56,166	Hungarians in the United Kingdom
39	Brazil	15,215	56,055	Brazilians in the United Kingdom
40	Nepal	5,943	54,695	Nepalis in the United Kingdom
41	Bulgaria	5,351	51,875	Bulgarians in the United Kingdom
42	Thailand	16,257	47,389	Thais in the United Kingdom
43	Singapore	40,474	45,351	Singaporeans in the United Kingdom
44	Mauritius	27,078	45,123	Mauritians in the United Kingdom
45	Russia	15,160	42,491	Russians in the United Kingdom
46	Czech Republic	12,220	41,605	Czechs in the United Kingdom
47	Japan	37,535	40,127	Japanese in the United Kingdom
48	Greece	35,169	39,700	Greeks in the United Kingdom
49	Tanzania	32,630	38,691	Tanzanians in the United Kingdom
50	Saudi Arabia	8,789	36,148	Saudi Arabians in the United Kingdom
51	Sweden	22,525	35,055	Swedes in the United Kingdom
52	Egypt	24,700	33,686	Egyptians in the United Kingdom
53	Vietnam	23,347	32,429	Vietnamese in the United Kingdom
54	Malta	30,178	31,758	Maltese in the United Kingdom
55	Zambia	21,529	30,897	Zambians in the United Kingdom
56	Belgium	21,668	29,142	Belgians in the United Kingdom
57	Colombia	12,331	27,691	Colombians in the United Kingdom
58	Algeria	10,670	26,826	Algerians in the United Kingdom
59	Trinidad and Tobago	21,283	25,364	Trinidadians in the United Kingdom
60	Sierra Leone	17,048	25,281	Sierra Leoneans in the United Kingdom
61	Denmark	18,695	24,972	Danes in the United Kingdom
62	Morocco	12,348	23,519	Moroccans in the United Kingdom
63	Guyana	20,872	23,458	Guyanese in the United Kingdom
64	Ukraine	11,913	23,414	Ukrainians in the United Kingdom
65	Austria	19,503	21,698	Austrians in the United Kingdom
66	Switzerland	16,010	21,458	
67	Democratic Republic of the Congo	8,569	20,971	Congolese in the United Kingdom
68	Barbados	21,601	20,271	Barbadians in the United Kingdom
69	Sudan	10,671	19,758	Sudanese in the United Kingdom
70	Israel	11,892	19,608	Israelis in the United Kingdom
71	Yemen	12,508	19,405	Yemenis in the United Kingdom
72	Eritrea	6,561	19,031	Eritreans in the United Kingdom
73	North Korea	22	18,697	
74	Norway	13,798	18,236	
75	Malawi	12,340	17,871	
76	Libya	9,141	17,684	
77	Lebanon	10,459	17,128	Lebanese in the United Kingdom
78	Ethiopia	7,775	16,654	Ethiopians in the United Kingdom
79	Angola	5,914	15,712	
80	Albania	2,314	14,688	Albanians in the United Kingdom
81	Finland	11,322	14,325	
82	Kuwait	5,882	14,054	
83	Burma (or Myanmar)	9,924	13,064	Burmese people in the United Kingdom
84	United Arab Emirates	5,406	12,314	Emiratis in the United Kingdom
85	Gambia	3,924	12,194	
86	Gibraltar	11,830	11,955	Gibraltarians in the United Kingdom
87	Argentina	6,796	11,339	
88	Cameroon	3,233	11,009	
89	Mexico	5,049	10,502	Mexicans in the United Kingdom
90	Indonesia	6,711	10,344	Indonesians in the United Kingdom
91	Grenada	9,783	10,009	Grenadians in the United Kingdom
92	Syria	4,168	9,950	Syrians in the United Kingdom
93	Saint Lucia	8,265	9,836	
94	Venezuela	3,996	9,834	
95	Congo	3,266	9,561	
96	Ecuador	3,035	9,422	Ecuadorians in the United Kingdom
97	Estonia	2,005	9,361	
98	Croatia	6,992	9,029	
99	Serbia	31,244 (including Kosovo)	9,008	Serbs in the United Kingdom
100	Ivory Coast (Côte d'Ivoire)	2,794	8,535	Ivoirians in the United Kingdom
101	Bosnia-Herzegovina	6,692	8,469	
102	Saint Vincent and the Grenadines	7,091	8,008	
103	Montserrat	7,983	7,828	Montserratians in the United Kingdom
104	Peru	4,066	7,787	Peruvians in the United Kingdom
105	Chile	5,131	7,673	Chileans in the United Kingdom
106	Dominica	6,739	6,851	
107	South Korea	12,310	6,767	British Koreans
108	Fiji	3,464	6,754	Fijians in the United Kingdom
109	Tunisia	3,070	6,606	
110	Mozambique	3,353	6,368	Mozambicans in the United Kingdom
111	Jordan	3,115	6,321	
112	Bahrain	4,185	6,261	
113	Saint Kitts and Nevis	6,519	6,067	
114	Brunei	2,782	5,731	
115	Kazakhstan	871	5,432	
116	Burundi	2,022	4,820	
117	Rwanda	2,373	4,781	
118	Belarus	1,154	4,734	Belarusians in the United Kingdom
119	Bermuda	2,986	4,602	
120	Bolivia	1,143	4,046	Bolivians in the United Kingdom
121	Antigua and Barbuda	3,891	3,995	Antiguans in the United Kingdom
122	Seychelles	2,905	3,878	
123	Liberia	1,583	3,844	
124	Botswana	2,051	3,513	
125	Oman	2,024	3,432	
126	Moldova	455	3,417	
127	Georgia	551	3,388	Georgians in the United Kingdom
128	North Macedonia	1,285	3,170	Macedonians in the United Kingdom
129	Azerbaijan	561	3,126	Azerbaijanis in the United Kingdom
130	Saint Helena	2,355	2,917	
131	Uzbekistan	521	2,864	
132	Qatar	1,062	2,706	
133	Cuba	1,083	2,665	
134	Namibia	1,230	2,649	
135	Guinea-Bissau	381	2,572	
136	Guinea	265	2,529	
137	Slovenia	1,228	2,298	
138	Iceland	1,552	2,225	
139	Senegal	723	2,135	
140	Luxembourg	1,222	2,092	
141	Bahamas	1,797	2,071	
142	East Timor	1	2,008	Timorese in Northern Ireland
143	Mongolia	293	1,821	Mongolians in the United Kingdom
144	Armenia	589	1,790	Armenians in the United Kingdom
145	Togo	553	1,743	
146	Swaziland	863	1,596	
147	Dominican Republic	523	1,485	
148	Uruguay	963	1,472	
149	Belize	1,233	1,452	
150	Cambodia	706	1,304	
151	Cape Verde	N/A	1,279	
152	Papua New Guinea	1,057	1,199	
153	Kyrgyzstan	133	1,132	
154	Madagascar	789	1,121	
155	Guatemala	499	1,049	
156	São Tomé and Príncipe	102	1,028	
157	Falkland Islands	1,044	968	
158	El Salvador	595	948	
159	Cayman Islands	369	914	
160	Lesotho	331	851	
161	Paraguay	493	816	
162	Turkmenistan	99	784	
163	Costa Rica	370	777	
164	Panama	492	769	
165	Laos	464	716	
166	Honduras	420	683	
167	Benin	239	678	
168	Aruba	0	678	
169	Anguilla	498	583	
170	Djibouti	237	486	
171	Suriname	264	476	
172	Bhutan	86	463	
173	Tajikistan	101	455	
174	Monaco	225	430	
175	Mali	121	411	
176	Nicaragua	223	406	
177	Maldives	200	402	
178	Gabon	135	393	
179	Chad	183	371	
180	Solomon Islands	309	364	
181	Haiti	164	340	
182	Equatorial Guinea	51	312	
183	Tonga	143	298	
184	British Virgin Islands	163	292	
185	Burkina Faso	99	237	
186	Samoa	125	233	
187	Mauritania	28	233	
189	Niger	96	217	
190	Kiribati	179	182	
191	Central African Republic	312	171	
192	Vanuatu	135	168	
193	Comoros	62	154	
194	United States Virgin Islands	124	134	
195	Andorra	35	63	
196	Liechtenstein	23	31	
197	Nauru	14	30	
198	Taiwan	6,588	N/A	
199	West Bank (Palestinian territories)	2,483	N/A	
200	Macau	1,490	N/A	
201	Netherlands Antilles	1,151	N/A	
202	Puerto Rico	306	N/A	
203	Guam	61	N/A	
204	Turks and Caicos Islands	56	N/A	
205	Cook Islands	37	N/A	
206	American Samoa	30	N/A	
207	British Indian Ocean Territory	19	N/A	
208	Tuvalu	10	N/A	
209	San Marino	9	N/A	
210	Norfolk Island	4	N/A	
211	Micronesia, Federated States of	3	N/A	
212	Niue	3	N/A	
213	Pitcairn Islands	3	N/A	
214	Palau	3	N/A	
215	Cocos (Keeling) Islands	0	N/A	
216	Northern Mariana Islands	0	N/A	
217	Tokelau	0	N/A	
218	Vatican City	0	N/A	

Country of birth	Population (2021/22 census)	Corresponding article(s)
India	965,000	British Indians
Poland	841,000	Poles in the United Kingdom
Pakistan	654,000	British Pakistanis
Romania	558,000	Romanians in the United Kingdom
Ireland	387,000	Irish people in Great Britain
Nigeria	294,000	British Nigerians
Italy	292,000	Italians in the United Kingdom
Germany	291,000	Germans in the United Kingdom
Bangladesh	277,000	British Bangladeshis
South Africa	235,000	South Africans in the United Kingdom

== Institute for Public Policy Research analysis ==
In 2005 the Institute for Public Policy Research published an analysis of data from the 2001 Census, revealing the number of people included in the census who were born outside the British Isles, where they lived, and comparing this information against the 1991 Census. The results were made available on the BBC website. Note that this data refers to Great Britain only, rather than the whole of the UK, because of the lack of digital boundaries in the census data for Northern Ireland.

== See also ==
- Modern immigration to the United Kingdom
- MigrationWatch UK
