= Migration from Latin America to Europe =

Latin American migration to Europe is the diaspora of Latin Americans to the continent of Europe, dating back to the first decades of the Spanish and Portuguese empires in the Americas. Latin Americans in Europe are now a rapidly growing group consisting of immigrants from Argentina, Bolivia, Brazil, Chile, Colombia, Costa Rica, Cuba, Dominican Republic, Ecuador, El Salvador, Guatemala, Honduras, Mexico, Nicaragua, Panama, Paraguay, Peru, Puerto Rico, Uruguay and Venezuela. It may also include individuals from certain French-speaking territories depending on the definition of Latin America used.

A large majority of Latin Americans in Europe reside in Spain or have been naturalized as Spanish citizens. The main reasons of their migration to Spain are the common language, ethnic or family ties and cultural proximity to Spain. Portugal, Italy and France also have a sizable Latin American community; in the case of Italy, many of the immigrants are descendants of the Italian diaspora in Latin America.

== Spain ==
Spain is the second destination of choice after the United States for Latin American migrants and the vast majority of Latin Americans in Europe are residents or nationals of this country.

After several years of decline since a peak in 2010, the population of Spain born in Latin America has grown again since 2016, specially after 2021. In 2025, 4,685,665 people born in South, Central America or the Caribbean (excluding Puerto Rico) had been legally residing in Spain for the last 12 months, compared to 2,340,247 in 2016 and 2,459,098 in 2010. A majority hold Spanish citizenship.

Following the "Law of historic memory" Latin Americans with a Spanish parent (and their descendants) have automatic right to Spanish citizenship, even without residing in the country. This potentially applies to millions of Latin Americans. In addition, all Latin Americans from Spanish speaking countries (and Brazil) qualify for Spanish citizens after two years' residence, regardless of recent ancestry. This compares very favorably to the requirement of ten years' residence for immigrants from other countries.

As a result, a significant and ever growing portion of Latin American immigrants have acquired Spanish citizenship due to naturalization laws and the falling number of Latin Americans residing in Spain is primarily due to them acquiring Spanish nationality and no longer being classed as immigrants. In the period between 2011 and 2013, over one million immigrants acquired Spanish citizenship and over 75% of these were Latin American. As an example, by 2014 the majority of Spain's 408,944 Ecuadorian-born residents had already acquired Spanish citizenship and were no longer included national statistics tracking immigration. As a result, Latin Americans with Spanish citizenship living in other European countries such as the UK, France or Germany benefiting from European freedom of movement and establishment for all EU citizens will be categorized as Spaniards when using nationality as a criterion to determine the country of origin (rather than country of birth) of a particular EU country's immigrant population. Despite Spain's prolonged 2008-2015 economic crisis during which the country suffered years of massive unemployment and went from having the second highest immigration rate in the world to becoming a net-emigrant country, less than 30% of Spain's Latin American immigrants have left the country during this period. As a result of the combined effect of nationalization and net emigration during the economic crisis, the Latin American resident population yet to acquire Spanish nationality fell steadily to around 900,000 in 2015.

| Country of birth | Population (2025) | Corresponding article |
|---|---|---|
| Colombia | 978,041 | Colombians in Spain |
| Venezuela | 692,316 | Venezuelans in Spain |
| Ecuador | 468,751 | Ecuadorians in Spain |
| Argentina | 450,883 | Argentines in Spain |
| Peru | 430,277 | Peruvians in Spain |
| Cuba | 252,290 | |
| Honduras | 220,593 | |
| Dominican Republic | 207,135 | Dominicans in Spain |
| Bolivia | 193,275 | |
| Brazil | 189,712 | |
| Paraguay | 162,633 | Paraguayans in Spain |
| Nicaragua | 93,905 | |
| Uruguay | 91,437 | Uruguayans in Spain |
| Mexico | 87,575 | Mexicans in Spain |
| Chile | 82,165 | |
| El Salvador | 40,811 | |
| Guatemala | 21,248 | |
| Panama | 9,028 | |
| Costa Rica | 8,350 | |
| Other countries in Central America and the Caribbean | 4,871 | |
| Other South American countries | 369 | |
| Total | 4,685,665 (9.5%) | |

== Germany ==
Distribution of Latin American population in Germany 2021

Latin American citizens registered in the German central register of foreigners. (only Western Germany until 1989)

| Country of birth | Population (1970) | Population (1980) | Population (1990) | Population (2000) | Population (2010) | Population (2020) | Population (2022) | Surplus of women in % (2022) | Corresponding article |
|---|---|---|---|---|---|---|---|---|---|
| Brazil | 3,487 | 5,485 | 10,486 | 24,142 | 32,537 | 49,500 | 55,710 | 72.2 | Brazilians in Germany |
| Colombia | 942 | 1,878 | 3,789 | 8,880 | 10,294 | 20,705 | 26,710 | 47.3 | |
| Mexico | 948 | 2,025 | 3,223 | 6,069 | 9,583 | 17,755 | 21,590 | 22.5 | Mexicans in Germany |
| Peru | 1,056 | 2,007 | 4,009 | 8,231 | 8,644 | 10,960 | 12,435 | 78.2 | |
| Venezuela | 934 | 1,207 | 1,485 | 3,052 | 3,501 | 8,025 | 11,095 | 15.2 | |
| Chile | 1,824 | 5,458 | 6,440 | 6,495 | 6,079 | 9,335 | 10,505 | -0.2 | |
| Cuba | 131 | 158 | 493 | 7,501 | 8,512 | 8,350 | 9,185 | 20.4 | |
| Argentina | 2,466 | 3,764 | 4,152 | 4,895 | 4,574 | 6,760 | 9,030 | 6.6 | |
| Dominican Republic | 51 | 197 | 862 | 4,803 | 6,060 | 6,460 | 6,580 | 76.5 | |
| Ecuador | 440 | 788 | 1,146 | 3,663 | 4,589 | 5,640 | 6,540 | 27.1 | |
| Bolivia | 774 | 1,263 | 1,522 | 1,729 | 1,720 | 2,060 | 2,410 | 37.4 | |
| El Salvador | 159 | 319 | 492 | 500 | 524 | 1,465 | 2,045 | 14.1 | |
| Honduras | 101 | 265 | 409 | 576 | 597 | 1,475 | 1,995 | 22.9 | |
| Costa Rica | 151 | 286 | 497 | 788 | 819 | 1,610 | 1,950 | 5.3 | |
| Paraguay | 263 | 400 | 603 | 854 | 1,122 | 1,570 | 1,780 | 115.0 | |
| Nicaragua | 109 | 191 | 358 | 636 | 541 | 1,140 | 1,490 | 0.7 | |
| Guatemala | 247 | 369 | 550 | 675 | 628 | 1,035 | 1,190 | 12.5 | |
| Uruguay | 405 | 657 | 800 | 758 | 558 | 800 | 900 | 16.9 | |
| Haiti | 251 | 242 | 280 | 422 | 548 | 635 | 705 | 23.8 | |
| Panama | 113 | 134 | 182 | 276 | 340 | 565 | 700 | 22.2 | |
| Total | 14,852 | 27,093 | 41,778 | 84,945 | 101,770 | 155,845 | 184,545 | 41.6 | |

Naturalizations from Latin American Countries to Germany

| Year | 2000 | 2001 | 2002 | 2003 | 2004 | 2005 | 2006 | 2007 | 2008 | 2009 | 2010 | 2011 | 2012 | 2013 | 2014 | 2015 | 2016 | 2017 | 2018 | 2019 | 2020 | 2021 | 2022 | Sum 2000–2022 |
|---|---|---|---|---|---|---|---|---|---|---|---|---|---|---|---|---|---|---|---|---|---|---|---|---|
| Number of Naturalizations | 1,682 | 2,086 | 2,317 | 3,047 | 2,905 | 2,890 | 3,306 | 3,070 | 2,861 | 3,125 | 3,290 | 3,253 | 3,072 | 3,552 | 3,634 | 3,740 | 3,722 | 3,745 | 3,815 | 4,285 | 3,975 | 4,555 | 4,245 | 76,172 |

== France ==
According to UN data, in 2019, the largest groups of Latin American migrants in France were from Brazil (181,500), Colombia (40,000), Mexico (40,000), Chile (30,325), Argentina (17,999), Peru (30,000), Venezuela (30,000), and Uruguay (10,859)

| Rank | Country of origin | Population (2021) |
|---|---|---|
| 1. | Brazil | 181,500 |
| 2. | Mexico | 40,000 |
| 3. | Colombia | 40,000 |
| 4. | Chile | 30,325 |
| 5. | Peru | 30,000 |
| 6. | Venezuela | 30,000 |
| 7. | Argentina | 17,999 |
| 8. | Uruguay | 10,859 |
| 9. | Other | 10,599 |
| | Total | 380,824 (1.1%) |

== United Kingdom ==
According to the 2001 UK Census, 62,735 Latin Americans in the United Kingdom were born in their respective nations of origin. There were also a further 1,338 people who stated their birthplace as 'South or Central America' (note this would also include Guyana, French Guiana, and Suriname, which are not part of Latin America.). In 2009, the Office for National Statistics estimated that the number of Brazilian-born people in the UK alone had risen to around 60,000 and the number of Colombian-born to around 22,000. Estimates for other Latin American countries were not made because the sample size did not allow for estimation of the size of smaller groups with sufficient degree of accuracy.

Latin American-born people in the United Kingdom in 2001

| Country of birth | Population (2011 census) | Corresponding article |
|---|---|---|
| Brazil | 52,148 | Brazilians in the United Kingdom |
| Colombia | 25,761 | Colombians in the United Kingdom |
| Argentina | 10,550 | |
| Mexico | 9,771 | Mexicans in the United Kingdom |
| Venezuela | 9,150 | |
| Ecuador | 8,767 | Ecuadorians in the United Kingdom |
| Peru | 7,246 | Peruvians in the United Kingdom |
| Chile | 7,130 | Chileans in the United Kingdom |
| Bolivia | 3,765 | Bolivians in the United Kingdom |
| Cuba | 2,481 | |
| Dominican Republic | 1,377 | |
| Uruguay | 1,364 | |

== Norway ==
From 1977 to 2012, the number of non-Norwegian citizens living in Norway of European descent has increased from around 46,000 to around 280,000. In the same period the number of citizens of nations on other continents increased from about 25,000 to about 127,000, of which 112,230 belong to Asia, Africa and South America. Immigrants and Norwegian-born to immigrant parents, by country of origin

| Rank | Country of origin | Population (2001) | Population (2014) |
|---|---|---|---|
| 1. | Chile | 6,491 | 7,904 |
| 2. | Brazil | 824 | 4,017 |
| 3. | Colombia | 604 | 3,841 |
| 4. | Peru | 492 | 1,295 |
| 5. | Cuba | 286 | 959 |
| 6. | Argentina | 378 | 890 |
| 7. | Dominican Republic | 276 | 844 |
| 8. | Ecuador | 174 | 492 |
| 9. | Bolivia | 134 | 308 |
| 11. | El Salvador | 134 | 235 |
| 12. | Uruguay | 167 | 234 |
| 13. | Guatemala | 81 | 191 |
| 15. | Nicaragua | 78 | 159 |
| 16. | Costa Rica | 52 | 133 |
| 17. | Honduras | 64 | 117 |

== The Netherlands ==
Immigrants and Dutch-born to immigrant parents Iberian America

| Country of origin | Population (1996) | Population (2000) | Population (2005) | Population (2010) | Population (2015) | Population (2019) |
|---|---|---|---|---|---|---|
| Argentina | 2,952 | 3,239 | 4,167 | 4,522 | 4,245 | 6,508 |
| Bolivia | 408 | 547 | 744 | 954 | 1,170 | 1,415 |
| Brazil | 6,589 | 8,913 | 12,289 | 17,022 | 22,041 | 30,104 |
| Chile | 3,566 | 3,937 | 4,564 | 4,936 | 5,488 | 6,207 |
| Colombia | 4,937 | 7,025 | 9,885 | 12,292 | 15,346 | 18,351 |
| Costa Rica | 274 | 444 | 623 | 741 | 970 | 1,242 |
| Cuba | 361 | 781 | 1,361 | 1,748 | 2,052 | 2,333 |
| Dominican Republic | 5,321 | 7,341 | 9,843 | 11,600 | 13,651 | 15,206 |
| Ecuador | 559 | 1,121 | 1,883 | 2,466 | 3,200 | 3,943 |
| El Salvador | 304 | 350 | 453 | 544 | 626 | 752 |
| Guatemala | 229 | 339 | 471 | 604 | 815 | 1,034 |
| Honduras | 203 | 269 | 387 | 505 | 670 | 816 |
| Mexico | 1,251 | 1,802 | 2,894 | 4,054 | 5,548 | 7,618 |
| Nicaragua | 273 | 314 | 403 | 535 | 693 | 843 |
| Panama | 244 | 278 | 353 | 393 | 470 | 561 |
| Paraguay | 215 | 238 | 270 | 281 | 328 | 371 |
| Peru | 1,849 | 2,418 | 3,662 | 4,925 | 6,100 | 7,324 |
| Puerto Rico | 91 | 101 | 132 | 153 | 199 | 241 |
| Uruguay | 805 | 886 | 997 | 1,069 | 1,135 | 1,234 |
| Venezuela | 2,257 | 2,948 | 4,090 | 4,936 | 6,002 | 7,420 |

Other / Dutch Americas

| Country of origin | Population (1996) | Population (2000) | Population (2005) | Population (2010) | Population (2015) | Population (2019) |
|---|---|---|---|---|---|---|
| Aruba | 274 | 592 | 1,204 | 2,250 | 4,130 | 5,610 |
| Curaçao | | | | | 203 | 982 |
| Caribbean Netherlands* | | | | | 15 | 64 |
| Netherlands Antilles* (dissolved) | 86,550 | 106,605 | 129,334 | 136,170 | 144,565 | 154,510 |

- includes Saba, Sint Maarten and Sint Eustatius which are not considered a part of Latin America because of the lack of Papiamentu language

French Latin America

| Country of origin | Population (1996) | Population (2000) | Population (2005) | Population (2010) | Population (2015) | Population (2019) |
|---|---|---|---|---|---|---|
| French Guiana | 401 | 477 | 707 | 716 | 767 | 836 |
| Guadeloupe | 194 | 219 | 306 | 301 | 327 | 397 |
| Haiti | 223 | 331 | 540 | 619 | 703 | 865 |
| Martinique | 85 | 94 | 105 | 106 | 121 | 123 |

== Portugal ==
In 2008, Portugal's foreign population grew 1% from 435,736 in 2007 to 440,277. One in four immigrants is Brazilian, and Portugal was a country for an increasing amount of Venezuelans. There are also other communities from Argentina, the latter can have Portuguese ancestry due to the historical ties between both nations.

| Country of birth | Population (2011) | Population (2019) | Corresponding article |
|---|---|---|---|
| Brazil | 139,703 | 158,799 | Brazilians in Portugal |
| Venezuela | 25,157 | 24,603 | Portuguese Venezuelans |

== Switzerland ==
In 2013, there were a total of 1,937,447 permanent foreign residents (23.8% of the total population of 8.14 million) in Switzerland. Of these, 51,761 were from Latin America and the Caribbean.

== Italy ==
The list is not complete, as it does not include some Latin Americans that have gotten citizenship via jus sanguinis.

| Rank | Country of citizenship | Population (2020) | Country of birth (2019) |
|---|---|---|---|
| 1. | Peru | 91,662 | 117,189 |
| 2. | Ecuador | 72,644 | 85,272 |
| 3. | Brazil | 51,790 | 115,970 |
| 4. | Dominican Republic | 29,111 | 46,127 |
| 5. | Cuba | 22,311 | 37,307 |
| 6. | Colombia | 18,053 | 40,769 |
| 7. | El Salvador | 16,270 | 14,682 |
| 8. | Bolivia | 13,141 | 15,794 |
| 9. | Venezuela | 10,316 | 53,007 |
| 10. | Argentina | 9,117 | 71,880 |
| 11. | Mexico | 4,567 | 9,441 |
| 12. | Chile | 3,017 | 12,775 |
| 13. | Honduras | 2,461 | 2,880 |
| 14. | Paraguay | 1,750 | 2,862 |
| 15. | Uruguay | 1,251 | 7,446 |
| 16. | Guatemala | 837 | 2,299 |
| 17. | Nicaragua | 700 | 1,311 |
| 18. | Costa Rica | 476 | 1,619 |
| 19. | Panama | 348 | 1,094 |
| 20. | Haiti | 306 | 792 |

== Sweden ==
As of 2021, there were 114,480 people in Sweden that were either born in Latin America or were born in Sweden and had two parents that were born in Latin America. 34% of these were from Chile and 13% from Colombia. Meanwhile 171,845 had some Latin American origin, meaning they were either born in Latin America or were born in Sweden and had at least one Latin American-born parent.

| Rank | Country of origin | Population (2021) |
|---|---|---|
| 1. | Chile | 39,404 |
| 2. | Colombia | 15,065 |
| 3. | Brazil | 12,456 |
| 4. | Peru | 10,250 |
| 5. | Bolivia | 6,158 |
| 6. | Argentina | 4,922 |
| 7. | El Salvador | 4,503 |
| 8. | Mexico | 3,975 |
| 9. | Cuba | 3,824 |
| 10. | Ecuador | 3,324 |
| | Other | 10,599 |
| | Total | 114,480 (1.1%) |

== Finland ==
As of 2021, 8,763 people in Finland had a Latin American background, up from 4,284 in 2011 and 614 in 1990. In 1990 the most common country of origin was Chile, accounting for 30% of Latin Americans. 2,814 of them live in Helsinki, where they make up 0.43% of the population. Brazil is the common country of origin, accounting for 26% of Latin Americans, followed by Mexicans (14%) and Colombians (9%). 594 children were adopted from Colombia between 1987 and 2021, making it the fourth most common country of origin for international adoptees in Finland, and accounted for 10.4% of all international adoptions. These are not counted as having Colombian background, however, and are instead counted with the background country of the adoptive parents, which is usually Finland.

| Rank | Country of origin | Population (2021) |
|---|---|---|
| 1. | Brazil | 2,315 |
| 2. | Mexico | 1,184 |
| 3. | Colombia | 826 |
| 4. | Peru | 678 |
| 5. | Chile | 668 |
| | Other | 3,092 |
| | Total | 8,763 (0.2%) |

== Ireland ==
| Rank | Country of origin | Population (2016) |
|---|---|---|
| 1. | Brazil | 13,640 |

== European Union (in general) ==
| HORIZONTALLY: Country of Residence VERTICALLY: Country of Origin | Belgium | Bulgaria | Czech Republic | Denmark | Germany | Estonia | Ireland | Greece | Spain | France | Croatia | Italy | Cyprus | Latvia | Lithuania | Luxembourg | Hungary | Malta | Netherlands | Austria | Poland | Portugal | Romania | Slovenia | Slovakia | Finland | Sweden | Iceland | Liechtenstein | Norway | Switzerland |
|---|---|---|---|---|---|---|---|---|---|---|---|---|---|---|---|---|---|---|---|---|---|---|---|---|---|---|---|---|---|---|---|
| Argentina | 2.863 | 105 | 537 | 3.724 | 22.960 | 112 | 2.842 | 710 | 302.595 | 15.590 | 255 | 73.943 | 95 | 24 | 55 | 587 | 521 | 355 | 5.168 | 2.125 | 544 | 2.032 | 114 | 479 | 98 | 510 | 4.128 | 88 | - | 1.423 | 10.883 |
| Bolivia | 1.305 | 6 | 135 | 470 | 5.950 | 8 | 816 | 24 | 176.758 | 4.257 | 43 | 14.721 | 44 | 2 | 0 | 104 | 58 | 20 | 1.121 | 542 | 77 | 214 | 22 | 18 | 13 | 174 | 4.695 | 17 | - | 595 | 5.346 |
| Brazil | 18.708 | 170 | 1.243 | 4.887 | 85.590 | 529 | 39.040 | 2.468 | 153.960 | 76.967 | 278 | 120.970 | 126 | 60 | 75 | 5.142 | 1.604 | 1.290 | 26.369 | 7.018 | 1.847 | 271.177 | 283 | 220 | 172 | 2.174 | 11.679 | 241 | - | 6.918 | 46.824 |
| Chile | 4.375 | 37 | 258 | 2.048 | 18.320 | 50 | 1.310 | 405 | 61.948 | 14.833 | 140 | 12.412 | 36 | 12 | 7 | 268 | 355 | 129 | 4.009 | 1.534 | 210 | 564 | 58 | 42 | 26 | 603 | 27.895 | 94 | - | 6.644 | 7.951 |
| Colombia | 8.030 | 69 | 470 | 3.643 | 33.120 | 102 | 883 | 490 | 532.267 | 36.699 | 107 | 42.209 | 69 | 20 | 22 | 695 | 427 | 1.255 | 17.057 | 2.568 | 500 | 2.060 | 91 | 67 | 72 | 1.297 | 13.411 | 265 | - | 6.374 | 15.958 |
| Costa Rica | 361 | 19 | 143 | 187 | 2.790 | 38 | 223 | 40 | 5.549 | 1.251 | 4 | 1.729 | 6 | 1 | 7 | 55 | 83 | 44 | 1.083 | 276 | 93 | 108 | 29 | 13 | 15 | 86 | 524 | 14 | - | 348 | 1.194 |
| Cuba | 2.044 | 400 | 776 | 578 | 14.190 | 41 | 270 | 481 | 166.075 | 6.050 | 41 | 37.697 | 29 | 47 | 16 | 772 | 572 | 63 | 1.660 | 1.109 | 378 | 1.559 | 64 | 94 | 145 | 580 | 3.039 | 58 | - | 1.130 | 3.916 |
| Dominican Republic | 3.208 | 32 | 84 | 223 | 12.390 | 7 | 170 | 650 | 185.199 | 7.549 | 13 | 47.300 | 28 | 0 | 0 | 0 | 54 | 27 | 9.951 | 3.300 | 64 | 252 | 36 | 195 | 20 | 225 | 946 | 53 | - | 980 | 13.149 |
| Ecuador | 6.385 | 28 | 153 | 653 | 12.790 | 39 | 281 | 110 | 415.927 | 6.968 | 29 | 77.201 | 14 | 4 | 10 | 0 | 277 | 38 | 2.964 | 880 | 186 | 612 | 56 | 16 | 39 | 248 | 2.727 | 63 | - | 854 | 8.724 |
| El Salvador | 0 | 6 | 40 | 111 | 2.500 | 11 | 330 | 85 | 27.711 | 1.672 | 0 | 20.542 | 7 | 1 | 0 | 39 | 21 | 18 | 560 | 131 | 36 | 103 | 8 | 2 | 2 | 76 | 3.352 | 33 | - | 239 | 1.044 |
| Guatemala | 942 | 5 | 57 | 277 | 3.580 | 19 | 381 | 32 | 14.618 | 2.965 | 2 | 2.346 | 4 | 3 | 0 | 119 | 32 | 17 | 959 | 469 | 44 | 122 | 12 | 6 | 10 | 89 | 918 | 40 | - | 493 | 1.191 |
| Honduras | 362 | 4 | 43 | 168 | 2.680 | 14 | 153 | 67 | 140.271 | 1.015 | 2 | 3.880 | 5 | 2 | 5 | 36 | 17 | 12 | 617 | 153 | 33 | 82 | 15 | 3 | 4 | 122 | 462 | 67 | - | 134 | 893 |
| Mexico | 3.288 | 89 | 934 | 1.677 | 28.910 | 183 | 3.301 | 443 | 61.413 | 17.259 | 102 | 10.290 | 47 | 37 | 49 | 592 | 768 | 144 | 6.446 | 2.678 | 893 | 906 | 174 | 100 | 162 | 1.115 | 3.700 | 156 | - | 1.719 | 8.910 |
| Nicaragua | 448 | 38 | 40 | 241 | 2.270 | 4 | 95 | 41 | 68.231 | 887 | 4 | 1.445 | 5 | 2 | 0 | 27 | 12 | 2 | 711 | 292 | 21 | 57 | : | 6 | 16 | 183 | 1.169 | 11 | - | 246 | 969 |
| Panama | 232 | 12 | 49 | 113 | 1.010 | 9 | 185 | 181 | 6.132 | 575 | 16 | 1.100 | 13 | 1 | 0 | 31 | 38 | 21 | 444 | 82 | 42 | 175 | 18 | 3 | 15 | 28 | 321 | 9 | - | 96 | 622 |
| Paraguay | 551 | 7 | 37 | 89 | 5.450 | 5 | 158 | 93 | 106.619 | 1.636 | 11 | 2.813 | 11 | 1 | 5 | 41 | 22 | 11 | 257 | 226 | 19 | 168 | 11 | 5 | 4 | 46 | 222 | 6 | - | 186 | 1.433 |
| Peru | 4.182 | 63 | 316 | 1.236 | 21.850 | 63 | 586 | 293 | 249.639 | 15.301 | 86 | 117.006 | 21 | 12 | 22 | 607 | 311 | 129 | 5.086 | 2.004 | 331 | 726 | 156 | 67 | 84 | 631 | 8.322 | 98 | - | 1.744 | 11.371 |
| Uruguay | 569 | 11 | 63 | 231 | 3.460 | 11 | 369 | 120 | 82.814 | 2.338 | 17 | 6.805 | 5 | 4 | 23 | 113 | 76 | 37 | 844 | 274 | 67 | 372 | 20 | 14 | 10 | 144 | 2.174 | 11 | - | 255 | 1.672 |
| Venezuela | 3.260 | 36 | 455 | 988 | 18.110 | 71 | 2.540 | 1.259 | 411.996 | 11.498 | 118 | 61.289 | 36 | 48 | 15 | 789 | 1.232 | 745 | 6.000 | 1.544 | 426 | 42.001 | 166 | 112 | 25 | 352 | 1.836 | 385 | - | 1.420 | 5.891 |
| 'Total amount of Latin Americans by country of residence | 72.826 | 1.198 | 6.076 | 22.348 | 304.440 | 1.337 | 55.262 | 8.571 | 3.173.923 | 395.171 | 1.386 | 657.684 | 720 | 291 | 321 | 10.459 | 6.644 | 4.538 | 375.852 | 27.825 | 6.059 | 324.208 | 1.437 | 1.488 | 981 | 8.892 | 92.962 | 1.783 | 519 | 32.792 | 152.039 |

Total amount of Latin Americans residing in the European Union (as of 2021); ~5.562.899

== See also ==
- List of countries by immigrant population
- Latin American migration to the United Kingdom
- Latino Americans
- Latino diaspora
