= Latin American migration to the United Kingdom =

British people of Latin American descent
Total population
- Est. number of Latin Americans in the United Kingdom; 250,000

Regions with significant populations
- London, Liverpool, Oxford, Cambridge, Manchester, Bristol, Edinburgh and Milton Keynes

Languages
- Latin American Spanish · Brazilian Portuguese · British English

Religion
- Predominantly Roman Catholic; smaller numbers of Protestants

Related ethnic groups
- Spanish Britons · Portuguese Britons

Latin American migration to the United Kingdom dates back to the early 19th century. Before the 1970s, when political and civil unrest became widespread in many Latin American countries, the Latin American community in the United Kingdom remained relatively small. Since then, economic migration to the UK has increased, with Brazilian- and Colombian-born residents forming the two largest Latin American groups, estimated at 79,000 and 16,000 respectively as of 2020/21.

A significant number of refugees and asylum seekers also arrived in the UK during the late 20th century. Since the turn of the century, Latin Americans have migrated to the UK for a wider range of reasons, and the community today includes people from diverse socioeconomic backgrounds. Additionally, the UK is home to British-born people of Latin American ancestry.

During the 2008–2014 Spanish financial crisis, Britain became one of the preferred European destinations for some of the approximately 1.4 million Latin Americans who had acquired Spanish citizenship.

== History and settlement ==
=== Early presence of political figures ===
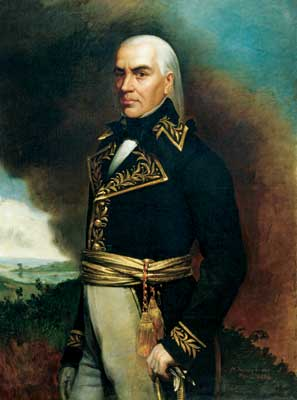
Revolutionary Francisco de Miranda established his campaign for Latin American independence in London.

Latin Americans have lived in what is now the United Kingdom for centuries, albeit in much smaller numbers than today.

In 1595, Sir Walter Raleigh established an alliance with the Indigenous chief Morequito of Spanish Guyana (present-day Venezuela). Morequito entrusted his son, Caywerace, to Raleigh for education in London, under an agreement that he would be installed as emperor of Guyana should England conquer the region. Caywerace accompanied Raleigh as a servant for several years.

The earliest Latin American migrants arrived in the late 18th and early 19th centuries, primarily politicians and writers who settled in London. Their aim was to raise funds for weapons to support the liberation of Latin America from Spanish and Portuguese rule. London became a key destination because Britain, seeking to weaken the Spanish Empire while strengthening its own position, was willing to offer support.

Among the most notable figures was General Francisco de Miranda, a Venezuelan-born political exile who spent 14 years in the British capital. Originally a member of the Spanish Navy, Miranda committed himself to the independence of Latin America after witnessing the American War of Independence and the French Revolution. In 1798, he founded the London lodge "The Great American Reunion" under the Scottish Rite. As an ally of Prime Minister William Pitt, Miranda secured financial support from the British government for Latin American independence efforts following several meetings with Pitt.

Another key figure, Simón Bolívar, known as "The Liberator" for his role in the Spanish–American wars of independence, visited London for six months in 1810. He led a Venezuelan diplomatic mission with scholar Andrés Bello and Luis López Méndez. Bolívar sought British naval and diplomatic support after the Junta of Caracas broke ties with the Spanish Crown. The delegation presented its case to Richard Wellesley, then Under-Secretary of State for Foreign Affairs. However, following pressure from the Spanish ambassador, who argued that Bolívar lacked the authority to negotiate self-rule, the British government declined. Bolívar returned to Venezuela, while others in the delegation remained in Somers Town, London.

José María Vargas was imprisoned in 1813 for revolutionary activities in Venezuela. Upon his release in 1814, he travelled to the United Kingdom to pursue medical training at the University of Edinburgh. In December 1814, Supreme Director Gervasio Antonio de Posadas, faced with Britain's refusal to sell arms to revolutionary movements due to a renewed alliance with Spain, sent Bernardino Rivadavia, Manuel Belgrano and Manuel de Sarratea to London. Their mission was to promote the crowning of Francisco de Paula, son of Charles IV of Spain, as regent of the United Provinces, and to negotiate with the Spanish monarchy for what they described as a "solid and equitable pacification."

In 1817, Manuel Palacio Fajardo published Outline of the Revolution in Spanish America in London, a work that helped shape European public opinion in favour of Latin American independence. Along with Luis López Méndez, he helped secure weapons and recruit members of the British Legion who later travelled to Venezuela to fight in Bolívar's army.

After independence, political figures such as José Antonio Zea and José Rafael Revenga remained in London, seeking loans to support the development of their newly formed nations.

Writers also benefited from London's relative safety. Many, who risked execution or imprisonment in their home countries, found refuge in the UK and published their work there. Notable examples include Venezuelans Andrés Bello and Simón Rodríguez, Brazilian Hipólito da Costa, and Colombian Juan García del Río.

=== Exiles and refugees after 1970 ===
The first significant wave of migration from Latin America to the United Kingdom occurred in the 1970s, catalysed in part by the Immigration Act 1971. Prior to this legislation, strict rules limited work permits and residency in mainland Britain to individuals from current or former British overseas colonies and territories. The act's provisions made it easier for Latin Americans and other groups to obtain the right to live and work in the UK, contributing to the growth of the Latin American community.

This period saw the arrival of both migrant workers and refugees fleeing oppressive political regimes. The first large group consisted of approximately 2,500 Chilean exiles who settled in London in the early 1970s. These migrants included businesspeople, academics, and students who had fled political instability in Chile. This group included both right-wing individuals fleeing the government of Salvador Allende and, later, leftists escaping Augusto Pinochet's regime.

Chile was not the only source of Latin American refugees in the 1970s and late 20th century. Individuals from Argentina, Bolivia, Colombia and Ecuador also sought asylum in the UK. Argentina's military dictatorship, known as the National Reorganization Process (1976–1983), was a major driver of migration during this period.

Colombians—who today form the largest Latin American group in the UK—began arriving in significant numbers in the 1970s. Most migrated between 1986 and 1997, driven by escalating guerrilla and paramilitary violence in Colombia. During the late 20th century, the UK was the most favoured European destination for Colombian migrants and refugees, surpassing Spain.

Bolivians represent a smaller Latin American refugee group in the UK. During Bolivia's late 20th-century political instability, many Bolivians chose to migrate to the United States or neighbouring South American countries. Nevertheless, the UK remains the second most common European destination for Bolivian migrants, regardless of migration status.

Cuban migration to the UK, though relatively small in scale, began in the early 1960s following the Communist takeover of Cuba. Many Cubans left during the Freedom Flights, which began in 1965, and a number chose the UK as an alternative to the United States.

== Demographics and population ==
Unlike the censuses of the United States and Canada, the United Kingdom Census does not include a category that allows individuals to identify as "Latin American." Consequently, it is difficult to determine the exact number of British citizens or residents of Latin American ethnic or national origin.

=== Official statistics on Latin American-born residents ===
According to the 2001 UK Census, 62,735 Latin Americans living in the United Kingdom were born in their respective countries of origin. An additional 1,338 individuals reported their birthplace as "South or Central America," though not all South American countries are considered "Latin."

By 2009, the Office for National Statistics estimated that the Brazilian-born population in the United Kingdom had increased to approximately 60,000, while the Colombian-born population had risen to around 22,000. However, estimates for other Latin American countries were not provided due to insufficient sample sizes, which limited the reliability of data for smaller groups.

Latin American-born people in the United Kingdom in 2001

Country of birth	Population (2021/22 census)	Corresponding article
Brazil	116,175	Brazilians in the United Kingdom
Colombia	38,968	Colombians in the United Kingdom
Venezuela	21,826	
Ecuador	19,980	Ecuadorians in the United Kingdom
Argentina	17,895	
Mexico	14,731	Mexicans in the United Kingdom
Peru	11,693	
Chile	8,821	
Dominican Republic	8,432	
Bolivia	7,622	Bolivians in the United Kingdom
Cuba	3,277	
Uruguay	2,088	

=== Other population estimates ===
Several additional estimates of the Latin American population in the United Kingdom have been published. A detailed analysis conducted in May 2011 estimated the population at 186,500, including 113,500 in London. This figure encompasses irregular migrants and second-generation Latin Americans.

=== Population distribution ===
According to a 2005 report by the Institute for Public Policy Research, based on data from the 2001 Census, the ten census tracts with the largest South American-born populations were all located in London. Hyde Park recorded the highest number, followed by Vauxhall North, Kensington, Chelsea, Vauxhall South, Regent's Park, Streatham North, Hammersmith, Streatham South, Hackney South, and Newham.

Outside London, the largest South American-born populations were recorded in Oxford, Cambridge, central Manchester, central Bristol, central Edinburgh, and Milton Keynes. More recent commentary has suggested that Liverpool may now host the largest Latin American population in the UK outside London.

Areas such as the Latin Village in South Tottenham and Elephant and Castle contain concentrations of Latin American shops and clubs. However, due to gentrification, the Latin American community in Elephant and Castle has experienced increasing displacement from the area.

== Latin Americans acquiring British citizenship ==
The table below presents the number of Latin Americans who acquired British citizenship between 1997 and 2008, listed in alphabetical order.

Previous nationality	1997	1998	1999	2000	2001	2002	2003	2004	2005	2006	2007	2008	Total
Argentina	22	38	45	62	45	105	120	115	145	120	125	120	1,062
Bolivia	11	19	28	23	30	25	35	50	50	70	75	65	481
Brazil	119	196	178	331	340	330	435	485	565	540	610	605	4,734
Chile	39	61	79	92	125	110	145	130	110	100	90	90	1,171
Colombia	185	272	296	381	375	945	1,000	1,290	1,500	1,580	1,845	1,115	10,784
Costa Rica	3	4	7	12	10	5	10	10	10	15	10	10	106
Cuba	7	8	15	18	30	60	65	90	115	90	90	80	668
Dominican Republic	12	13	19	17	30	55	50	65	55	35	20	35	406
Ecuador	20	33	39	43	55	80	200	325	655	955	745	580	3,730
El Salvador	6	9	5	13	25	15	15	15	10	10	5	15	143
Guatemala	6	13	6	4	10	15	10	10	10	5	20	15	124
Honduras	15	2	9	11	15	5	15	10	10	10	5	10	117
Mexico	26	52	74	116	100	105	145	160	175	145	135	115	1,348
Nicaragua	3	9	8	6	0	10	10	0	5	5	5	10	71
Panama	4	8	4	7	10	10	5	10	20	10	10	25	123
Paraguay	2	0	1	4	0	0	5	15	5	5	0	5	42
Peru	65	78	80	117	105	185	175	180	230	130	220	170	1,735
Puerto Rico													
Uruguay	8	4	4	10	10	10	15	15	10	25	10	10	131
Venezuela	23	40	46	49	60	65	85	95	120	105	155	120	963
												Total	27,939

== Cultural impact ==
=== Festivals ===
Several festivals celebrating Latin American culture take place in the United Kingdom, including:

- Brazilica Festival (Liverpool)
- Carnaval del Pueblo (London)
- Carnival de Cuba (London)
- El Sueño Existe (Machynlleth)

=== Newspapers ===
The newspaper Noticias Latin America (NLA) was published in London from 1992 until around 2008. It ceased publication, and the company was officially dissolved in 2010.

Crónica Latina was likely among the first Latin American newspapers published in London. Founded in 1984 by Juan Salgado, it initially appeared under the title Notas de Colombia before adopting the name Crónica Latinas in 1986. The newspaper is no longer in circulation.

== Social and political issues ==
=== Assimilation into British culture ===
Latin Americans residing in the United Kingdom are sometimes described as the "Invisibles," a term used to highlight their limited visibility in public life and the absence of formal recognition as an ethnic minority group.

=== Economics and employment ===
Approximately 85 per cent of Latin Americans in the UK are employed, although many work in positions below their skill or qualification levels, and relatively few receive state benefits. Around 70 per cent have some level of education beyond secondary school. However, they are reportedly ten times more likely to earn less than the minimum wage. Many migrants arriving with professional qualifications, including lawyers and other skilled workers, often take on lower-skilled roles due to limited employment opportunities.

According to community reports, 40 per cent of Latin American workers have experienced workplace abuse or exploitation, and 11 per cent state they are paid below the national minimum wage—a rate ten times higher than the national average.

=== Asylum seekers and refugees ===
A significant number of Latin Americans have sought safety and political asylum in the United Kingdom as a result of conflicts and civil unrest in their countries of origin. This includes individuals fleeing the Colombian armed conflict, which began in 1964.

== See also ==
- Latin Americans
- Latin America–United Kingdom relations
- Latin American diaspora
- Foreign-born population of the United Kingdom
- Migration from Latin America to Europe
- Spaniards in the United Kingdom
- Portuguese in the United Kingdom
- British Latin American
