= Latin American diaspora =

Total population
- c. 60 million

Regions with significant populations
- United States: +50,000,000
- Europe: +4,000,000
- Spain: 4,252,074
- France: 300,000 - 500,000
- Canada: 1,193,880
- Italy: 512,857
- Japan: +345,000
- United Kingdom: 261,000
- Germany: 206,094
- Netherlands: 113,282
- Sweden: 100,115
- Portugal: ~100,000
- Australia: 93,795
- Switzerland: 89,868
- New Zealand: 38,742

The Latin American diaspora refers to the dispersion of Latin Americans out of their homelands in Latin America and the communities subsequently established by them across the world.

== Emigrant policies ==
The countries of Latin America seek to strengthen links between migrants and their states of origin, while promoting their integration in the receiving state. These Emigrant Policies focus on the rights, obligations and opportunities for participation of emigrated citizens who already live outside the borders of their country of origin. Citizens' rights are the most important policy area, followed by social policies that expand welfare functions beyond state borders. Research on Latin America shows that the extension of policies towards migrants is linked to a focus on civil rights and state benefits that can positively influence integration in recipient countries. Some states actively help their emigrated citizens to integrate into local society. Such policies can reduce the cost of integration for emigrants – and provide untapped potential for cooperation between countries of origin and destination. In addition, the tolerance of dual citizenship has spread more in Latin America than in any other region of the world.

== Latin American diaspora in Anglo America ==
The United States and Canada are popular destinations for Latin American immigrants. The United States (including Puerto Rico) is home to more than 65.3 million Latino Americans, representing 19.5% of the US population. Meanwhile, Canada is home to over 1 million Latino residents. These numbers are majority descendants and minority immigrants.

=== Latin American diaspora in the United States ===
Over 55 million Latino Americans are residents of the United States, representing 18.3% of the US population. Latino Americans (latinos) are American citizens who are descendants of immigrants from Latin America. More generally, it includes all persons in the United States who self-identify as Latino, whether of full or partial ancestry. For the 2010 US census, the American Community Survey, "Hispanic" or "Latino" were those who identified as one of the specific Hispanic or Latino categories listed on the census or ACS questionnaire ("Mexican", "Puerto Rican", or "Cuban") as well as those who indicated that they were "other Spanish, Hispanic, or Latino". The peoples of countries considered as Hispanic or Latino American groups by the Census Bureau were the following: Spain, Argentina, Mexico, Puerto Rico, Cuba, Dominican Republic, Costa Rica, Guatemala, Honduras, Nicaragua, Panama, El Salvador, Bolivia, Chile, Colombia, Ecuador, Paraguay, Peru, Uruguay, and Venezuela. The Census Bureau uses the terms Hispanic and Latino interchangeably. The Census office of the United States excluded Brazilian Americans from the Hispanic and Latino American population (Brazil is part of Latin America, but Portuguese is the official language rather than Spanish). Other US government agencies have slightly different definitions of the term, including Brazilians and other Portuguese-speaking groups.

== Latin American diaspora in Europe ==
Latin American migration to Europe is the diaspora of Latin Americans to the continent of Europe, dates back to their independence from Spain and Portugal. Latin Americans in Europe are a rapidly growing group consisting of immigrants from Argentina, Bolivia, Brazil, Chile, Colombia, Costa Rica, Cuba, Dominican Republic, Ecuador, El Salvador, Guatemala, Honduras, Mexico, Nicaragua, Panama, Paraguay, Peru, Puerto Rico, Uruguay and Venezuela.

Over 3 million Latin Americans lived in Europe, mostly in Spain, which has over 4.2 million people residents or citizens born in the Americas as of 2024. They represent over 8% of the population of Spain, yet less than 1% of the total population of the European Union. Portugal also has a sizable Brazilian population.

Latin Americans migrate to the European Union for the following reasons:

- Common language, cultural and ethnic ties to Spain and Portugal.
- Historically massive Spanish, Italian and Portuguese emigration to Latin America, resulting in family ties and right to citizenship at origin.
- Favorable naturalization laws for all Latin Americans in Spain, regardless of ancestry.
- Universities are tuition-free or significantly cheaper than other countries.
- Study loans are widely available.

== Latin American diaspora in Oceania ==
Chile, Colombia and El Salvador have significant diasporas in Australia.

Country	Immigrants in Australia
Chile	26,204
Colombia	21,000
El Salvador	10,563

The most significant Latin American diasporas in New Zealand are Brazilian, Chileans, Argentinians, Colombians, Mexicans, Uruguayans, Venezuelans, and Bolivians.

Latino Country	Immigrants in New Zealand
Brazil	3,588
Chile	2,409
Argentina	1,701
Colombia	1,155
Mexico	741
Uruguay	447
Venezuela	150
Bolivia	153

The Latin American diaspora in Easter Island is Chilean, 39% of Easter Islander population were mainland Chileans (or their Easter Island-born descendants) or mestizos (primarily European Chilean blood with little Indigenous mixtures, or their Easter Island-born descendants) and Easter Island-born mestizos of Chilean and Rapa Nui or native Chilean descent, and the remaining 1% were indigenous mainland native Chileans (or their Easter Island-born descendants).

== Latin American diaspora in Asia ==
Mexicans and Peruvians have immigrated to the Philippines since Spanish colonial rule. One in three inhabitants of the Filipino island of Luzon have partial Latin American descent. Furthermore, about 1.2 million citizens of Zamboanga City, Mindanao, speak Chavacano, a creole language based on Mexican Spanish.

The most significant Latino diaspora in Japan is Brazilian, followed by the Peruvian and Bolivian diaspora. Migration of South Americans to Japan was significant after the Second World War. Peruvian, Brazilian, and Bolivian settlers in Japan are largely, but not exclusively of Japanese blood; migration of Brazilian settlers to Japan represented the largest number of Portuguese speakers in Asia, greater than those of formerly Portuguese East Timor, Macau and Goa combined. Because of common language and cultural proximity, a number of Brazilians settled Macau, others in East Timor and Goa.

Latin countries	Immigrants to Japan
Brazil	185,000
Peru	57,464
Colombia	37,500
Bolivia	6,094
Paraguay	2,240
Mexico	1,995

== Latin American diaspora in Africa ==
Historically, Latin Americans have migrated to African countries over the course of colonization by Spain and in the aftermath of wars. Equatorial Guinea, whose official language is Spanish, experienced an influx of Spanish migrants as it was once a Spanish colony. Some Cuban soldiers who served in the Angolan Civil War stayed in Angola afterwards. Brazilians have moved to Angola and Mozambique, former Portuguese colonies, and modern officially Portuguese-speaking nations. Nigeria, the home of the Yoruba and Igbo cultures, experienced an influx of ex-slaves from Cuba and Brazil brought there as indentured servants during the 17th century, and again during the 19th century; Equatorial Guinea received Afro-Cuban slaves. In Equatorial Guinea, they became part of the Emancipados; in Nigeria, they were called Amaros. Despite being free to return to Cuba and Brazil when their tenure was over, they remained in these countries marrying into the local native population.

== See also ==
- Hispanics
- Latin Americans
- Latin American culture
- Lusitanics
- Migration from Latin America to Europe
