= Ugandan migration to the United Kingdom =

Ugandans in the United Kingdom
Total population
- Born in Uganda; 51,000 (2014 ONS estimate)

Regions with significant populations
- Greater London, Leicester, West Midlands, Greater Manchester

Languages
- English (British English, Ugandan English), Luganda, Swahili, Gujarati and other languages of Uganda

Religion
- Roman Catholicism, Anglicanism, Hinduism, Islam

Related ethnic groups
- Black British, African British, British Asian, East African Indian, British Tanzanian, British Congolese, British Kenyans

Ugandan migration to the United Kingdom refers to the movement of people from Uganda. Today, a small proportion of people in the United Kingdom were either born in Uganda, or have Ugandan ancestry.

In 1972, almost 60,000 Ugandan Asians were expelled from the country by President Idi Amin. The British government ultimately permitted 27,000 to move to the UK through the Uganda Resettlement Board. Instead of allowing them to migrate to the UK, the British government had initially sought agreement from its British overseas territories to resettle them; however, only the Falkland Islands responded positively.

The 2001 UK Census recorded a total of 55,213 people born in Uganda resident in the UK. The 2011 UK Census recorded 59,227 Ugandan-born residents in England, 588 in Wales, 986 in Scotland, and 82 in Northern Ireland.

The Office for National Statistics estimates that in 2014, 51,000 people born in Uganda were resident in the UK.

A mapping exercise undertaken by the International Organization for Migration in 2006 reported that community representatives estimated that there were between 300,000 and 750,000 Ugandans in the UK, including Ugandan Asians. One informant estimated the size of the black Ugandan community in the UK to be between 180,000 and 350,000.

A majority of immigrants from Uganda live in and around London, although at the time of the 2001 Census, 11,000 Ugandan Asians were reported to still live in Leicester. According to the BBC, between 1968 and 1978, more than 20,000 displaced East African Asians settled in Leicester, and they "now constitute the dominant sub-group in the Leicester Asian community".

== See also ==
- Black British
- British Indian
- British Pakistani
- Demographics of Uganda
- Ugandan Americans
- Uganda–United Kingdom relations
