= British Latin American =

Latin Americans of British ancestry

British Latin Americans
Total population
- ≈ 3,000,000

Regions with significant populations
- Argentina; Brazil; Chile; Mexico; Paraguay; Peru

Languages
- Mostly Spanish, Portuguese, and English; Minorities: Welsh, Lowland Scots, Scottish Gaelic, and Irish Gaelic

Religion
- Christianity (Protestantism and Catholicism) and irreligion

Related ethnic groups
- Rest of the British diaspora and other White Latin Americans

British Latin Americans (Spanish: Latinoamericano británico; Portuguese: Latino-americano britânico; Haitian Creole: Britanik Latino-ameriken) are Latin Americans of British ancestry.

British immigration to Latin America occurred mostly in the 19th and 20th centuries and went primarily to Mexico, Chile, Brazil and Argentina.

== Argentina ==
Most of the British Argentine population consists of Anglo-Argentines concentrated in the Buenos Aires metropolitan area. In the mid-1980s, the number of English Argentines was estimated at 100,000; by 2025, some estimates place the population at over 1,000,000.

Notable Argentines of significant or full English ancestry include Jorge Luis Borges and Olivia Hussey, the latter known for her portrayal of Juliet in Franco Zeffirelli's 1968 film Romeo and Juliet. Carlos Pellegrini, who served as President of Argentina from 1890 to 1892, was of English descent through his mother and of Franco-Italian descent through his father.

Argentina has also had a Welsh community in Patagonia since the arrival of settlers from Liverpool in 1865. Known as Y Wladfa, the settlement was established by Welsh nonconformists seeking to create a “Little Wales” away from English influence. The Welsh Argentine population is estimated at between 80,000 and 100,000.

The Scottish diaspora in Argentina is estimated at 200,000 people. The first Argentine woman to earn a Doctor of Medicine degree was Cecilia Grierson, who was of Scottish ancestry.

== Brazil ==
The Gracie family, famous for Brazilian Jiu-Jitsu, was founded by George Gracie, a 19th-century Scottish immigrant.

Charles Miller is considered the father of football in Brazil. Having introduced the sport to the country and the first to organize the play in a formal manner, founding the São Paulo Athletic Club (SPAC), Brazil's first sports club and football club, and helping to found the Liga Paulista de Foot-Ball (current Campeonato Paulista) the first and oldest on-going championship. He is also considered the father of Rugby union in Brazil.

Oscar Cox, son of a British diplomat, introduced football to his native city, Rio de Janeiro, a century ago. He founded one of the top teams in Brazil, Fluminense Football Club.

The Brazilian Bawden family branch was initiated by Thomas Bawden, an early 19th-century Cornish immigrant, who was very successful in gold prospection in the region of Ouro Preto, Minas Gerais province, in the then Brazilian Empire. Following his goldmining enrichment, his daughter Mary Angel Bawden was married to a Brazilian nobleman, the Second Baron of Camargos, whose father, the first Baron of Camargos, was a prominent political figure in the aforementioned province.

== Chile ==
Chile currently has the largest population of British descendants in Latin America. These descendants, according to some estimates, would be 1,000,000 people.

Chile, facing the Pacific Ocean, had an important British presence. Over 50,000 British immigrants settled in Chile from 1840 to 1914, an important number of them settled in Magallanes, especially the city of Punta Arenas when it flourished as a major global seaport for ships crossing the Strait of Magellan from the Atlantic to the Pacific Ocean. Also, around 32,000 English people settled in Valparaíso. That significantly influenced the port city, which became practically a British colony during the last decades of the 19th century and the beginning of the 20th century. However, the opening of the Panama Canal in 1914 and the First World War took many of them away from the city.

Some British Chileans are of Scottish and Scots-Irish origins. Some Scots settled in the country's temperate climate and forested landscape with glaciers and islands, which reminded them of their homeland (the Highlands and Northern Scotland), while English and Welsh made up the rest. The Irish immigrants were frequently confused with the British, and arrived as merchants, tradesmen and sailors, settling along with the British in the main trading cities and ports.

The British founded the first football club in Valparaíso, and in Santiago sometime later, such as Santiago Wanderers, Everton and Prince of Wales Country Club, among others.

Chileans of British descent include: former president Patricio Aylwin; Benjamín Vicuña Mackenna, writer and politician; Alejandro Foxley, Pedro Dartnell, Claudio Bunster, Bernardo Leighton, Vivianne Blanlot, Agustín Edwards Mac Clure; Minister of Foreign Affairs; Jorge Edwards; former Minister of Foreign Affairs; Gustavo Leigh; member of the former Government Junta of Chile Roberto Elphick; Bishop of the Methodist Episcopal Church; Juan Williams; commander-in-chief of the Chilean Navy at the beginning of the War of the Pacific; Patricio Lynch, William Thayer, Robert Winthrop Simpson, Juan Pablo Bennett, Alberto Blest Gana; writer members of the Edwards family; Hernán Somerville, banker Harold Mayne-Nicholls, president of ANFP and Chilean Football Federation; Mary Rose McGill, socialite, etc.

== Mexico ==
During the Colonial era, the Spanish restricted the entrance of other Europeans, however, some non-Spanish Europeans were present. In 1556, the English adventurer Robert Thomson encountered the Scotsman Thomas Blake (Tomás Blaque), who had been living in Mexico City for more than twenty years. Blake is the first known Briton to have settled in what would become Mexico.

During his third voyage, the ship commanded by John Hawkins escaped destruction at the Battle of San Juan de Ulúa (1568). However, after becoming lost in the Gulf of Mexico and with a bloated crew, Hawkins abandoned more than one hundred men near Tampico. A group of the men went north (including David Ingram), while the rest went south and were captured by the Spanish. Notable among this group was Miles Philips who wrote a narrative detailing his and the other Englishmen's struggles. They were taken to Mexico City, given care at a hospital and imprisoned. After attempting to escape, they were sold as servants or slaves. Some were able to accumulate wealth by rising to the position of overseers at mines and other operations. However, after the establishment of the Mexican Inquisition, the men were stripped of any wealth and imprisoned as Lutheran heretics. Three of the men were burned, while some sixty were given penance.

Various British privateers and pirates repeatedly attacked the coastal cities of New Spain, most famously in Campeche. In southern Baja California Sur, a few families retain the English surname "Green". This surname is sometimes cited as a legacy of the British pirates who frequented the Cape region. However, the founder was established to be Esteban Green, an English whaler that settled in the region in 1834.

The first great power that recognized the independence of Mexico was the United Kingdom in 1824, shortly after the sale of mines from Pachuca and Real del Monte occurred. The majority of migrants to this region came from what is now termed the Cornish "central mining district" of Camborne and Redruth. Real del Monte's steep streets, stairways and small squares are lined with low buildings and many houses with high sloping roofs and chimneys which indicate a Cornish influence. Mexican remittances from these miners helped to build the Wesleyan Chapel in Redruth.

The Panteón de Dolores, which became the largest cemetery in Mexico, was founded in 1875 by Juan Manuel Benfield, the son of Anglican immigrants. Benfield fulfilled his father's goal of creating a cemetery after his sister was refused burial in Catholic cemeteries and had to be interred at a beach.

According to the 1895 National Census, 3,263 residents were from the United Kingdom.

The twin silver mining settlements of Pachuca and Real del Monte are being marketed as of 2007 as 'Mexico's Little Cornwall' by the Mexican Embassy in London and represent the first attempt by the Spanish speaking part of the Cornish diaspora to establish formal links with Cornwall. The Mexican Embassy in London is also trying to establish a town twinning arrangement with Cornwall. In 2008 thirty members of the Cornish Mexican Cultural Society travelled to Mexico to try and re-trace the path of their ancestors who set off from Cornwall to start a new life in Mexico.

== Paraguay ==
Main articles: English people in Paraguay and Australian Paraguayans

The British people mostly arrived from England in Paraguay during the colonial period as investors and industrialists. They were noted throughout the Southern Cone region of Paraguay as being skilled farmers, investors, and bankers and as having created many of the regions railways and settled vast tracts of land.

Australian settlers arrived in Paraguay in 1893, at that time under British territorial rule. Most of them are descendants of a group of radical socialist Australians who voluntarily went to Paraguay to create a failed master-planned community, known as Nueva (New) Australia.

== Peru ==
A British Peruvian is a Peruvian citizen of British descent. The phrase may refer to someone born in Peru of British descent or to someone who has immigrated to Peru from Britain. Among European Peruvians, the British were the fifth largest group of immigrants to settle in the country, after the Spanish, Italians, Germans and French.

Between 1860 and 1950 it is estimated that around 900 British settled in Peru, although many of them returned to Europe or emigrated to countries like Argentina and Chile. The regions from which most of the British immigrants originated were Southampton and London and Birmingham. There are an estimated 500,000 Peruvians of British descent.

The popular soft drink Inca Kola was invented by the British immigrant Joseph Robinson Lindley. The Lindley Corporation continues to manufacture the drink.

== See also ==
- English Argentines
- Britons in Mexico
- Colombians in the United Kingdom
