= Americans in the United Kingdom =

Emigrants from the United States

Total population
- US-born residents in the United Kingdom: 231,853 – 0.3% (2021/22 Census) (Note: Does not include Americans born in the United Kingdom or those with ancestry rooted in the United States); England: 198,656– 0.4% (2021); Scotland: 23,863 – 0.4% (2022); Wales: 4,625 – 0.1% (2021); Northern Ireland: 4,990 – 0.3% (2021); US citizens/passports held: 122,794 (England and Wales only, 2021)

Regions with significant populations
- London; South East England; East of England; Scotland

Languages
- American English and British English

Religion
- Predominantly Christianity and Judaism

Related ethnic groups
- American diaspora and British Americans

Americans in the United Kingdom, American Britons or American British are emigrants from the United States who are residents or citizens of the United Kingdom.

== History ==
Between the late 19th century and World War II, many so called "dollar princesses" married British aristocrats. They were mostly the daughters of newly rich American men, who married the men with aristocratic titles to improve the social standing of their family in America. In return, these American heiress brought their wealth in the form of dowries to the homes of the British aristocracy. The trend only slowed when the women of newly rich families, who had been shunned by the American high society, began to be accepted by them.

During the Second World War, the first influx of American troops arrived in Britain on January 26, 1942 in Belfast, Northern Ireland. More than 1,600,000 American servicemen and servicewomen were in Great Britain by June 6, 1944, when the Normandy invasion was launched. Troop numbers gradually came down after that.

== Population ==
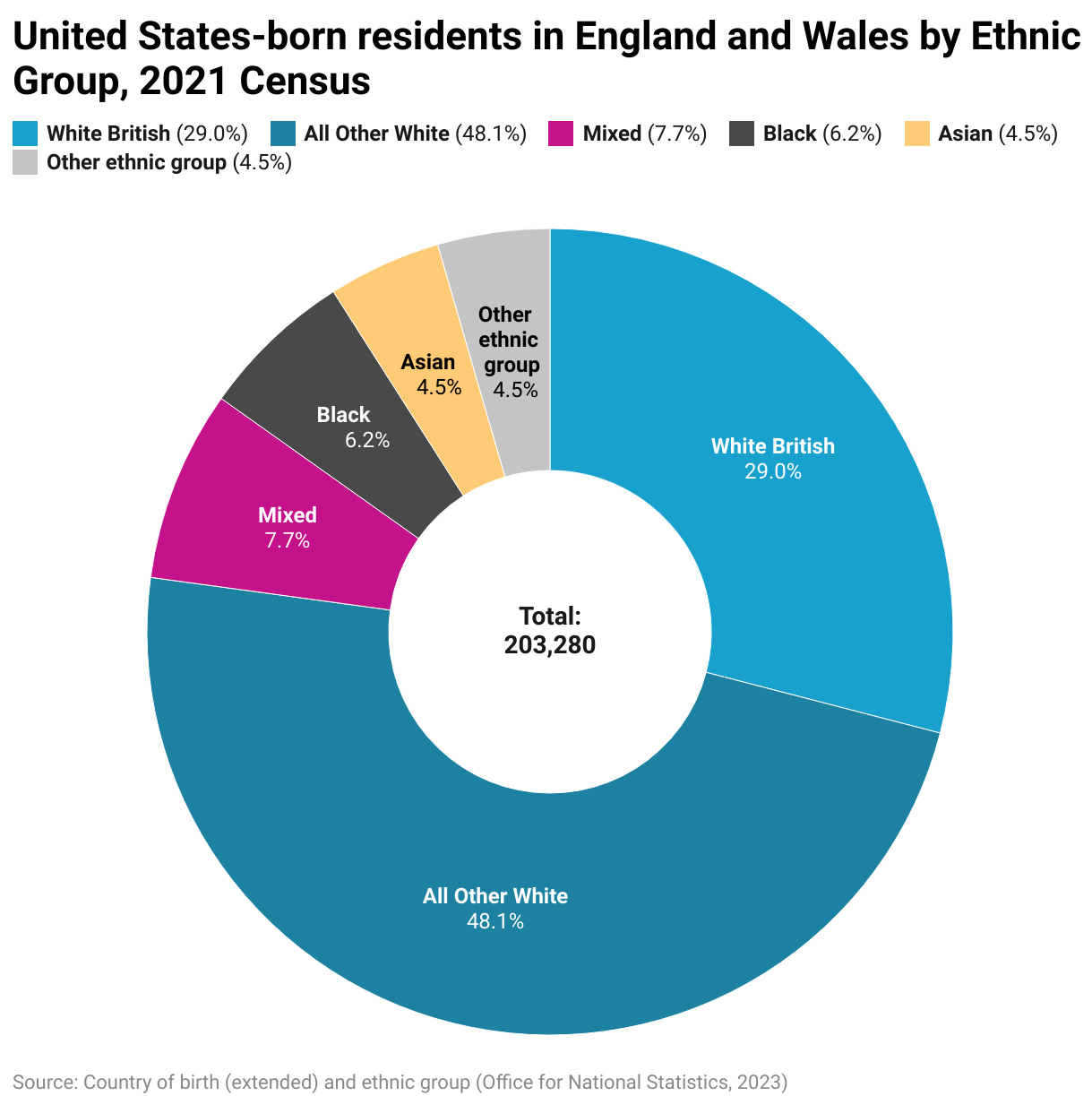
United States-born residents by ethnic group (2021 census, England and Wales)

The 2001 UK Census recorded 158,434 people born in the United States. According to the 2011 UK Census, there were 173,470 US-born residents in England, 3,715 in Wales, 15,919 in Scotland, and 4,251 in Northern Ireland. The Office for National Statistics estimates that 197,000 US-born immigrants were resident in the UK in 2013. In a 2020 House of Commons research briefing on immigrants working in the National Health Service out of 1.28 million members of staff, 1,380 declared that they were American.

The largest single local cluster of Americans in the UK recorded by the 2001 UK Census was in Mildenhall in North-West Suffolk—the site of RAF Mildenhall and nearby RAF Lakenheath. This is because of the legacy of the Cold War and NATO cooperation. 17.28% of Mildenhall's population were born in the United States. In London, the majority of Americans are businesspeople and their families which ties in with the strong economic relations between the City of London and New York City or Washington, D.C. Chelsea (where 6.53% of residents were born in the US in 2001) and Kensington (5.81%) have large American communities.

Prior to the end of the Cold War, the highest proportion of Americans resident in the United Kingdom per head of population was centred on the Scottish seaside town of Dunoon, Argyll and Bute, the former site of the Holy Loch US Navy base. At its height in the early 1990s, around one quarter of Dunoon's population was American.

In the 2000s, some Americans in the UK were older, ex-servicemen who returned to Britain after being based in the UK during World War II.

== Culture ==
=== Sports ===
The British National Baseball League features many American expatriates.

== Notable people ==
Nancy Astor, Britain's second female Member of Parliament and first to take her seat, and thus the first female sitting member of Parliament, was born in Virginia and married into the wealthy Anglo-American Astor family.

Henry James, considered one of the greatest novelists in the English language, was born to a Boston Brahmin family and moved to London in 1869. Aside from brief periods spent on the Continent and two short trips back to the US, James spent the rest of his life in England. (See Lamb House). He was naturalised as a British subject in the final year of his life.

T. S. Eliot left his family home in St. Louis, Missouri, to go to Harvard, in New England. From there he moved to Europe and stayed in Germany and France. When World War I began, he moved to Oxford, United Kingdom. He gained British citizenship and joined the Church of England.

Wallis Simpson was the American-born wife of Anglo-American businessman Ernest Simpson before her marriage to the Duke of Windsor, formerly King Edward VIII. The latter famously abdicated in 1936, the same year he ascended the British throne; in order to marry her. Despite living primarily in France, she was buried next to her husband in the Royal Burial Ground at Frogmore, the first American to be interred there.

Zoë Wanamaker is a US-born British actress of Jewish-Ukrainian ancestry, Louis Theroux is the son of American writer Paul Theroux, whilst Mika has a Lebanese mother and an American father born in Jerusalem.

Boris Johnson, former Prime Minister of the United Kingdom from 2019–22, was born in New York City. Until 2016, he held dual citizenship of both the United States and the United Kingdom. He relinquished his US citizenship to prove his allegiance to the United Kingdom.

Andrew Tate is an American-British former professional kickboxer and businessman, was born in Walter Reed Army Medical Center in Washington, D.C., then moved to United Kingdom.

YouTuber Evan Edinger, who vlogs about the comparisons between the UK and the United States since moving to the UK in 2012, gained British citizenship in June 2021.

African-American immigration to the UK began as early as the late-eighteenth century after American slaves failed in their attempt to defend the British Crown in the American Revolution. The Revolution began in the thirteen American colonies and United States in the late-1770s. The British promised freedom to any slave or rebel who fought the Americans on their behalf. African Americans made up over 20% of the American population at the time, which was the second-largest ethnic group in British North America only after the English and as many as 30,000 slaves escaped to British lines. The largest regiment was the Black Pioneers who followed troops under Sir General Henry Clinton. Working as soldiers, labourers, pilots, cooks, and musicians, they were a major part of the unsuccessful British war effort. African Americans who fought against the British were known as Black Patriots (modern day African Americans in the US), but rather if they were fighting for the Crown or American Independence both were mostly doing it in return for promises of freedom from enslavement or indentured servitude.

The British-American Commission identified the Black people who had joined the British before the surrender, and issued "certificates of freedom" signed by General Birch or General Musgrave. Those who chose to emigrate were evacuated by ship. The fallout of the Revolution resulted in an estimated 75,000 to 100,000 Black Americans scattering across the Atlantic world, profoundly affecting the development of Nova Scotia, the Bahamas, Jamaica, and the African nation of Sierra Leone as prominent leaders in the emerging freed black communities. To make sure no one attempted to leave who did not have a certificate of freedom, the name of any Black person on board a vessel, whether slave, indentured servant, or free, was recorded, along with the details of enslavement, escape, and military service, in a document called the Book of Negroes. Between 400 and 1,000 African Americans emigrated to London and were later given the title of Black Loyalist for their service in the British Armed forces and formed the core of the early Black British community.

African-American guitarist and singer Jimi Hendrix started to get his big break in London as part of his band The Jimi Hendrix Experience. He first entered the UK on 24 September 1966 at London Airport (now Heathrow Airport).

The African-American singer Edwin Starr, moved to the UK in the 1970s, and lived there until his death in 2003.

American actress Lisanne Falk, who starred in the 1980s cult film Heathers, has resided in the UK since 2006 and became a naturalized British citizen in 2019.

Trans drag performer and actress Cara Melle, who was a contestant on the fifth season of RuPaul's Drag Race UK is originally from Atlanta but has resided in the UK since 2015.

The British politician and former Labour MP Oona King, is the daughter of the African-American civil rights academic Preston King.

Meghan Markle, the Duchess of Sussex since her marriage to Prince Harry, kept her American citizenship and has a mixed-raced heritage with parents both American, of German and English ancestry for her father and of African-American background for her mother. Their son, Archie, who was born in London on 6 May 2019, has had dual British and American citizenship since birth.

Sheila Ferguson, a former member of The Three Degrees, was born in and grew up in Philadelphia and has permanently settled in England since the 1980s where she is still famous with her own solo career.

Covert Affairs star Sendhil Ramamurthy resides in London, and is of Indian descent.

English musician Dhani Harrison is the son of George Harrison of The Beatles and Mexican-American Olivia Trinidad Arias (who also now lives in the UK).

In 2001, 306 Puerto Rican-born people alone were residing in the United Kingdom (the nineteenth-most common birthplace amongst Latin American states). The most notable Puerto Rican-Briton is Wilnelia Merced, the widow of the late entertainer, Sir Bruce Forsyth.

Martin Frobisher returned from a voyage to discover the Northwest Passage in 1576, bringing with him a native Inuit that he had seized. The man died days after reaching London and was buried in the churchyard at St. Olave's.

Sir Richard Grenville captured the Roanoke Island Native American Raleigh (named for Sir Walter Raleigh) and brought him to Bideford following a skirmish in 1586. He had his baptism at Saint Mary the Virgin's Church in March 1588. He died from influenza in Grenville's house on 2 April 1589. His interment was at that same church five days later. Raleigh was the first Native American to have a Christian conversion and an English resting place.

Chief Powhatan's daughter, Pocahontas spent some of her life in London two years after she married English colonist John Rolfe. At age twenty-one, Pocahontas died due to an unknown disease. She was buried at St George's Church in Gravesend afterwards. Her son Thomas Rolfe lived in England until the age of 20 before returning to Virginia.

Lakota tribes arrived in England when they were part of Buffalo Bill's Wild West Show. Surrounded By the Enemy, a twenty-two-year-old Oglala gun-slinging and horse-riding stuntman and a year old boy named Red Penny died during the tour in 1887. Their interments were at West Brompton's cemetery. Brulé tribesman Paul Eagle Star died after breaking his ankle when he fell off a horse in Sheffield on 24 August 1891 at age twenty-seven. His interment was in West Brompton near the same plot as Surrounded. Fifty-nine-year-old Oglala Sioux, Long Wolf, died during the tour due to pneumonia on 13 June 1892. His interment was in West Brompton. Two months later, a two-year-old girl named White Star Ghost Dog died when she fell from her mother's arms during horseback. Her remains shared the same grave as Long Wolf's remains. Long Wolf and White Star Ghost Dog's coffins were repatriated to the Pine Ridge Reservation in 1997. Two years later, Paul Eagle Star's coffin was repatriated to the Rosebud Indian Reservation. Tribal descendants include John Black Feather (Long Wolf's great-grandson), Moses Eagle Star and Lucy Eagle Star (Paul Eagle Star's two grandchildren).

Blackfoot Sioux chief Charging Thunder came to Salford at age twenty-six as part of Buffalo Bill's Wild West Show in 1903. Like many Lakota tribesmen, Charging Thunder was an exceptional horseman and performed thrilling stunts in Buffalo Bill's show in front of huge crowds, on the site of what is now Lowry in Salford Quays. But when the show rolled out of town, he remained in the North West. He married Josephine, an American horse trainer who had just given birth to their first child, Bessie and together they settled in Darwen, before moving to Gorton. His name became George Edward Williams, after registering with the British immigration authorities to enable him to find work. Williams ended up as an elephant keeper at the Belle Vue Zoo. He died on 28 July 1929 from pneumonia at age fifty-two. His interment was in Gorton's cemetery.

American actress Gillian Anderson was born in Chicago and grew up in London from the age of one. She grew up in the areas of Crouch End and Haringey. She moved to Grand Rapids, Michigan at the age of 11 years old where she attended City High-Middle School. She moved back and has resided permanently in London since 2002.

More recently, notable British people of Native American descent include actress Hayley Atwell, who has dual UK-US citizenship due to her part-Native American father.

== Education ==
American schools in the United Kingdom:

- The American School in London
- American School in England (Plymouth area)

International School of Aberdeen was formerly the American School in Aberdeen.

== See also ==
- Canadians in the United Kingdom
- Mexicans in the United Kingdom
- Foreign Account Tax Compliance Act
- British American
- United Kingdom–United States relations
