= Tanzanians in the United Kingdom =

Total population
- Tanzanian-born residents 32,630 (2001 census); 35,994 (2011 census); Other population estimates 100,000 (Tanzanian organisations' 2009 estimate)

Regions with significant populations
- London, Birmingham, Reading, Manchester, Milton Keynes

Languages
- Swahili, English, and many other Languages of Tanzania

Religion
- Sunni Islam, Hinduism, Catholicism and Lutheranism.

Related ethnic groups
- Black British, Asian British, Africans in United Kingdom, Kenyan migration to the United Kingdom, Ugandan migration to the United Kingdom Somali migration to the United Kingdom, Sudanese migration to the United Kingdom

Tanzanians in the United Kingdom are citizens or residents of the United Kingdom whose ethnic or national origins lie fully or partially in Tanzania. The Tanzanian community in the UK is the largest of any OECD nation and mainly consists of indigenous Black Africans alongside thousands of East African Asians who fled from violence during the Zanzibar Revolution.

== History ==
There is a long and complex history of Tanzanians in the UK, with various individuals of various ages, occupations and races migrating to the UK for numerous reasons. Central Tanzania is predominantly Christian whilst the coastal areas are largely Muslim. Prior to the Zanzibar Revolution of 1964, the Arab and South Asian diasporas in Tanzania (then two separate nations named Tanganyika ad Zanzibar) had a hard and tough lifestyle, but when violence erupted during the revolution they were targeted and attacked even more so. During the 1970s a large percentage of the nation's South Asian community were forced out, with ultimately 50,000 seeking refuge in the UK and Canada. This alongside the expulsion of Asians from Uganda in 1972 significantly increased the number of South Asians in the United Kingdom. Besides the early migration of East African Asians from Tanzania to the UK, since the 1990s there has been an increasing presence of the nation's indigenous Black African population. Despite this there were already numerous Black Africans who had migrated to the UK during the country's rule over Zanzibar and Tanganyika between the mid-19th century and 1964. Tanzanians in the UK tend to have a lower average age than the average of British people as a whole, the majority of Tanzanian-born individuals in the UK are youths and young adults who came to the country for economic reasons, to study or simply escape the Tanzanian political regime. Despite being in general more peaceful than some of its neighbouring nations, Tanzania has been known for significant amounts of political unrest during election periods. The country became a dangerous place to be in 1995, 2000 and again in 2004. This each time has forced many youths to flee the nation, with the UK being a popular choice of destination due to its already long established Tanzanian diaspora which is the largest on earth.

== Demographics ==
The 2001 UK census recorded 32,630 Tanzanian-born people in the country. In the 2011 census, 34,798 people born in Tanzania were recorded as living in England, 439 in Wales, 681 in Scotland and 76 in Northern Ireland. These figures do not include British-born people of Tanzanian origin.

Community organisations have put the figure of Tanzanians in the UK at roughly 100,000, with the vast majority of these located in the British capital. An International Organization for Migration mapping exercise published in 2009 suggests that besides the 20,000-25,000 in London, the community is fairly spread out.

Within London, the largest concentration of Tanzanians can be found in the boroughs of Barking and Dagenham, Hammersmith and Fulham, Lambeth, Lewisham, Hackney and Camden. Birmingham in the West Midlands follows with an estimated 4,500-5,000 residents of Tanzanian origin, some 3,500-4,000 individuals live in Reading, the figure for Manchester is slightly lower at 3,000-3,500. It is thought that some 2,500-3,000 Tanzanians live in Milton Keynes, whilst the nearby settlements of Coventry and Northampton are home to roughly 1,500-2,000 Tanzanian residents. Slough and Leicester are both noted for having in the range of 800 and 1,500 Tanzanian residents each, whilst the cities of Leeds, Glasgow, Cardiff and Edinburgh all have a presence of Tanzanian individuals in their hundreds.

The majority of Tanzanian people in the UK, are ethnically Black African with many being Zanzibari although a significant proportion of the population, like the Ugandan British community are of Asian origin seeking political refuge in the 1960s and 1970s. Despite political unrest in Tanzania from time to time, the actual figure of Tanzanians applying for asylum in the UK is low, with only 390 applications (excluding dependents) made over the period 1999 to 2008, the lowest number from any African nation.

== Culture and Community ==
=== Events ===
The Tanzanian Diaspora Investment and Skills Forum is an annual event that takes place in the UK for Tanzanians based in the country. Uhuru Day (Tanzanian Independence Day) celebrations in the UK are organised by the British Tanzanian newspaper TZUK. Religious holidays such as Eid al-Fitr and Eid al-Adha are observed by Muslim Tanzanians (mostly Zanzibari), whilst Christmas and Easter are big celebrations in the Christian Tanzanian community. In London a community group named WATU organises numerous events throughout these periods.

=== Media ===
There is currently only one Tanzanian newspaper in the UK, entitled TZUK; the newspaper has been in circulation since May 2008 and has been proven to be an effective medium for communicating with Tanzanians in UK. It is distributed through Tanzanian community organisations, churches, restaurants and other businesses. Besides TZUK, a study by the IOM showed the most popular publications for Tanzanians in the UK were Metro, The Guardian and The Sun. Tanzanian-based newspapers are also available digitally online from the UK. The same study showed that the majority of Tanzanians in the UK prefer to listen to mainstream British radio, although the Swahili stations Clouds FM, Radio Tanzania, Radio Tumaini and BBC Swahili were also popular. There is no Tanzanian TV channel that broadcasts in the UK.

=== Music ===
Historically the music of Tanzania had little to no presence in the general African music scene in the UK. In the 1980s music of African origin was extremely popular in the UK, not only within the Black community but the population in general. Numerous Afrobeat and Reggae songs topped the charts, and various other African genres could be found in nightclubs throughout the capital. Despite this, the vast majority of singers and acts originated from Western Africa, South Africa and the Caribbean. This lack of music presence was also reflected in the Tanzanian homeland where Tanzanian musicians had to travel to countries such as Kenya due to lack of recording facilities in the country. Since the 1990s Tanzanian music has become more prominent in the UK, with entertainment for the diaspora finally becoming more evident. Numerous music venues in central London cater largely to the local Tanzanian communities.

== See also ==
- Black British
- British Asian
- Foreign-born population of the United Kingdom
- Demography of Tanzania
- Tanzanian Americans
