= Colombians in the United Kingdom =

Colombians in the United Kingdom Colombianos en el Reino Unido
Total population
- Colombian-born residents 25,761 (2011 Census); 39,000 (2020 ONS estimate)

Regions with significant populations
- London (Lambeth, Islington, Southwark, Camden, Haringey) ·

Languages
- Colombian Spanish · British English

Religion
- Predominantly; Roman Catholicism

Related ethnic groups
- Colombian diaspora · Colombian people · Latin Americans in the United Kingdom · Spaniards in the United Kingdom · Venezuelans in the United Kingdom • Brazilians in the United Kingdom · Peruvians in the United Kingdom • Panamians in the United Kingdom • Ecuadorians in the United Kingdom • Portuguese in the United Kingdom · Hispanic · Latino

Colombians in the United Kingdom or Colombian Britons (Spanish: Colombianos en el Reino Unido) include British citizens or residents who are of Colombian ancestry. According to the 2011 UK Census, the Colombian-born population of England was 25,016, Wales 166, Scotland 507 and Northern Ireland 72.

== History ==
Latin American migration to Europe has been growing rapidly since the mid-1960s. The first migrants consisted of Chilean and Argentine refugees, these were followed by Colombians and many other Latin American groups in the early 1970s. Many Colombians came to work in the UK on visas mainly in the domestic services and catering industries. Colombians in the UK tend to originate from the country's urban areas such as Bogotá, Cali, Medellín and Palmira, although some come from the smaller towns and countryside. There are roughly three stages of Colombian migration to the UK, between 1975 and 1979 many came under the work permit system to take up jobs in low pay domestic services predominantly. Between 1980 and 1986 many relatives and families of the early settlers came to the UK, many of them soon became illegal immigrants due to themselves overstaying their visas. Another stage where significant numbers of asylum seekers came to the UK was between 1986 and 1997 when thousands came to the UK due to guerrilla and paramilitary violence in Colombia. This is the period where the largest number of Colombians came to the UK, although significant numbers were still migrating in 2009 as the Colombian British population expands into its second generation. Historically, the United Kingdom has, in fact, proven the most popular European destination for Colombian migrants despite the lack of historical links that are evident with Spain. Spain alongside several other European nations has formerly been dubbed a "reservoir of migrant labour". However, since the turn of the millennium, Spain has become a key destination within Europe for Colombian migrants and is now home to the large majority of the Colombian community in the European continent, with over 350,000 Colombian-born residents in Spain as of 2015. Significantly smaller communities are present in the United Kingdom, France and Italy.

== Population ==
The 2001 Census recorded 12,331 Colombian-born people living in the UK. The 2011 Census recorded 25,016 Colombian-born residents in England, 166 in Wales, 507 in Scotland, and 72 in Northern Ireland. The Office for National Statistics estimates that in 2020, 39,000 Colombian-born people were residing in the UK.

According to one estimate, Colombians now make up the second largest sub-group of Latin American Britons behind Brazilian Britons, numbering up to 160,000. An article published by the Migration Policy Institute estimates the Colombian population in the UK to be 90,000 as of 2003. The overwhelming majority of Colombians in the UK live in London, although within the capital they are fairly well dispersed. Despite this, the largest numbers can be found in the boroughs of Lambeth, Islington, Southwark and Camden. Outside of London, concentrations of Colombians can also be found in the Northern English cities of Sunderland, Leeds and Newcastle. The vast majority are Roman Catholic.

Number of Colombians granted British citizenship (1997–2007) (Figures since 2001 are rounded to the nearest five)
Year	1997	1998	1999	2000	2001	2002	2003	2004	2005	2006	2007
Number	185	272	296	381	375	945	1,000	1,290	1,500	1,580	1,845

=== Asylum seekers ===
Applications for asylum from Colombians in the UK started to rise in 1996, peaked in 1997 and has been falling since then (with the exception of 1999 which saw a sharp increase). The sudden rise in asylum applications between 1996 and 1997 could have been linked to paramilitary and guerrilla violence in Colombia. Also the sharp drop in applications in 1998 could be associated with the introduction of visa restrictions. After the increase in 1999, the start of the 21st century has seen a more or less stable number of applications by Colombians for asylum. The table below is a breakdown for applications received for asylum in the UK between 1993 and 2002.

Number of applications by Colombians for asylum in the United Kingdom (1993–2003) (All figures are rounded to the nearest five)
Year	1993	1994	1995	1996	1997	1998	1999	2000	2001	2002	2003
Number of applications	380	405	525	1,005	1,330	425	1,000	505	360	420	220
Number recognised as refugees	5	5	<5	10	20	150	5	60	40	45	15
Number granted exceptional leave	10	15	5	5	25	60	5	60	55	20	5
Number refused asylum	80	390	210	365	380	810	155	1,755	660	415	315

Region wise, the regions with the most Colombian asylum seekers on support in 2001 were London, North East England and North West England respectively.

== Community ==
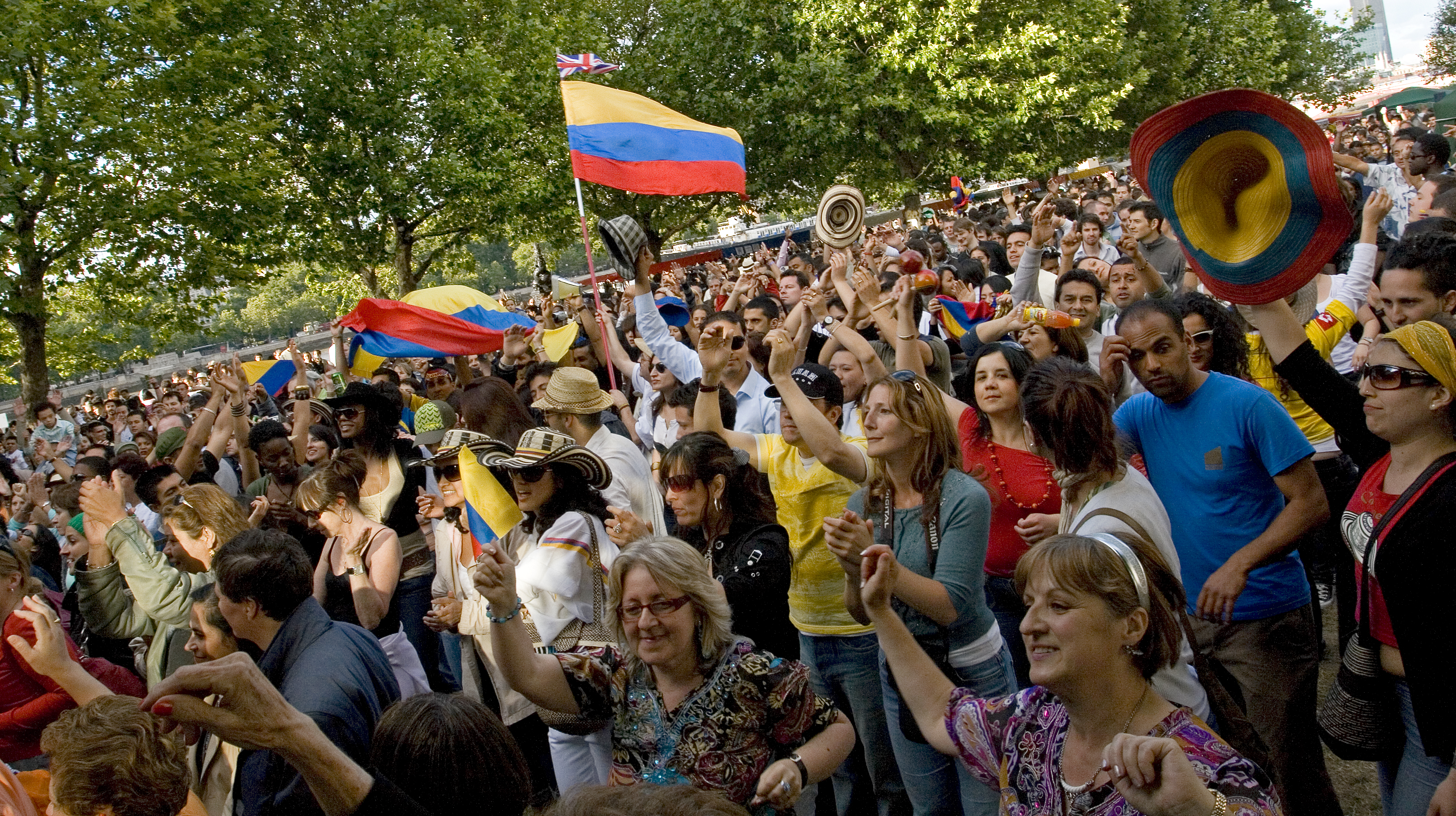
Colombians on London's South Bank celebrating Colombian independence day

=== Culture ===
Colombian culture and cultural activities in the UK are virtually non-existent compared to places such as Miami or New York City. This is due to the United States having a much larger Colombian community, as well as stronger links between the two countries. The few Colombian events that occur across the country are music festivals (usually in the summer). Many popular Colombian artists and musicians come to the UK to play in these festivals. The British capital, London is home to several Colombian clubs, restaurants and cafes as well as many shops and independent businesses, there is also a significant presence of Colombian media in the UK, consisting mainly of a few newspapers and radio stations. A similarity between Colombia and the United Kingdom is that football is an extremely popular sport in both countries; this easily helps link communities and today many Colombians play in the Latin American leagues of London as well as for local teams. Despite this, some of these activities are seen more as entrepreneurial than cultural activities. Besides Colombian football and music in the UK, the other aspect that contributes to the culture of Colombians in the UK is food. Sancocho is a traditional Colombian dish that has become popular in mainstream London and to an extent British culture. Colombian students who are studying in the UK often organise events that mainly involve debates and conferences about the situation back home in their native Colombia.

=== Employment ===
Country of birth	New immigrants employed	Settled immigrants employed	Average employed
United Kingdom	N/A	N/A	73.49%
Brazil	57.38%	80.70%	69.04%
Canada	82.76%	78.12%	80.44%
Colombia	49.96%	66.48%	58.22%
Jamaica	54.41%	65.21%	59.81%
United States	68.08%	76.05%	72.02%

Many new Colombian immigrants including asylum seekers and refugees in the UK find finding work extremely difficult, it has become increasingly complicated over time to gain visas and working permits in the UK and there is also the likely chance of a claim for asylum being denied. Despite this, there are hundreds if not thousands of new Colombian immigrants to the UK per annum, with the vast majority of these having little knowledge of the English language at all. This makes it hard to gain access to public services and ultimately more complicated to get a job, language skills are extremely important, and if Spanish is the only language spoken by and individual, they are bound to be beaten to the post by a fluent or more conversational English speaker. As stated earlier many new immigrants work in minimum wage jobs such as in domestic service and catering industries. Lack of English skills is also a negative aspect for Colombians in the UK outside of the world of work, for example it may be hard to gain required information from local councils as well as legal advice. As a response to this many new Latin American set up groups have been founded in London to help Colombians and other Hispanics to improve their language skills and/or find work. According to Institute for Public Policy Research findings, 49.96 per cent of new Colombian immigrants in Great Britain are employed, compared to 66.48 per cent of settled Colombian immigrants.

=== Housing ===
Housing is often identified as one of the main problems facing new Colombian immigrants and asylum seekers to the UK. A study of the housing situation of these people carried out in 1995 highlighted the problems of homelessness and poor housing. The situation is worst for single people, but also affects families. No studies have yet been performed to determine the housing trends of settled Colombian immigrants and second generation British born people of Colombian descent.

=== Social issues ===
Many Colombians come to the UK as asylum seekers, and in certain circumstances it can be hard for them to integrate, especially since the lack of Colombian culture and influence in the UK can be all too obvious. In June 2000, there were 118 Colombian nationals imprisoned in the UK (103 male and 15 female); many of them are involved in the Colombian drug trade (the UK is one of the largest buyers of Colombian cocaine, millions of hectares of rainforest are being destroyed each year in Colombia to supply drug users in countries such as the UK. Drug mules are also a problem, with many Colombians risking their lives by transporting drugs inside of them to get into the UK). This is the largest number of foreign nationals in British prisons originating anywhere in the Americas, although in comparison to the number of certain foreign nationals from Europe, Asia, Africa and elsewhere it is fairly small. As the Colombian British population grows larger, so do the problems within the community; it is believed that the differences within the community are now more visible and unity is less evident. Many of these differences mirror situations in Colombia where differences in social class, political views and immigration status all contribute to an ever fragmenting community. The most obvious difference seems to be between those who immigrated between 1970 and the early 1990s when political persecution was more evident, whilst more recent immigrants (particularly asylum seekers) have had greater difficulty in proving their status as political refugees, partly down to the current complicated situation in Colombia. Out of a survey of several Colombians in London, the majority stated their frustration with the overall Colombian British community as when it comes to organising cultural events, attendance can often be very poor. The perception is that settled Colombian Brits are too busy working and to an extent lose their political awareness and interests of Colombian culture in the UK and at home in Colombia.

== Notable individuals ==
Several Colombian immigrants to the UK as well as British born people of Colombian descent, have gained notable success, some examples are listed here. Jorge Castano is a Cali born professional wrestler who has made a new life and career for himself in the UK, Fernando Montano is the first Colombian to dance with the Royal Ballet and has been a member of the company since 2006, Phil Manzanera a musician and record producer who was the lead guitarist with Roxy Music was born in London to a Colombian mother and English father. Colombian American journalist, Sonia Uribe studied in and now lives in London. José Fernández Madrid was a former ambassador to the UK for Colombia who lived in the UK for a number of years where he subsequently died. Another notable expatriate in the UK of Colombian origin is Australian actor Adam Garcia who has found fame in many US and British films. Colombian-born author and award-winning academic Dr Camila Devis-Rozental is a recognised figure in Higher Education. She was included in the 2022 and 2023 Shaw Trust Disability Power 100 list which recognises the 100 most influential disabled people in the UK. In 2010 Miss Great Britain winner Tara Hoyos-Martínez of Colombian parentage became the first Latina to represent the country in the global Miss Universe pageant.

== See also ==
- Latin American migration to the United Kingdom
- Colombian people
- Colombian diaspora
- Culture of Colombia
- Colombia–United Kingdom relations
