= Slovaks in the United Kingdom =

Slovak British
Slováci v Británii

Total population
- Slovak-born residents in the United Kingdom: 79,193 (2021/22 Census) (Note: Does not include ethnic Slovak born in the United Kingdom or those with Slovak ancestry); England: 71,803 (2021); Scotland: 3,249 (2022); Wales: 1,219 (2021); Northern Ireland: 2,922 (2021)

Regions with significant populations
- Derby, Sheffield, Bradford, Rotherham

Languages
- Majority:English, Slovak; Minority:Romani, Czech

Religion
- Christianity · Judaism • Protestantism

Related ethnic groups
- Czechs in the United Kingdom

Slovaks in the United Kingdom are those born or raised in the United Kingdom, or residents, who are of ethnically Slovak descent or originate from Slovak, a country in Central Europe.

== History, population and settlement ==
Slovaks started immigrating in large to the United Kingdom in 2004, when Slovakia joined the European Union. They settled in suburbs of cities and towns such as Normanton, Derby, Page Hall in Sheffield, Ferham and Eastwood in Rotherham, Cliftonville in Margate, among others.
