= Britons in Mexico =

Ethnic group in Mexico

British Mexicans británico-mexicanos
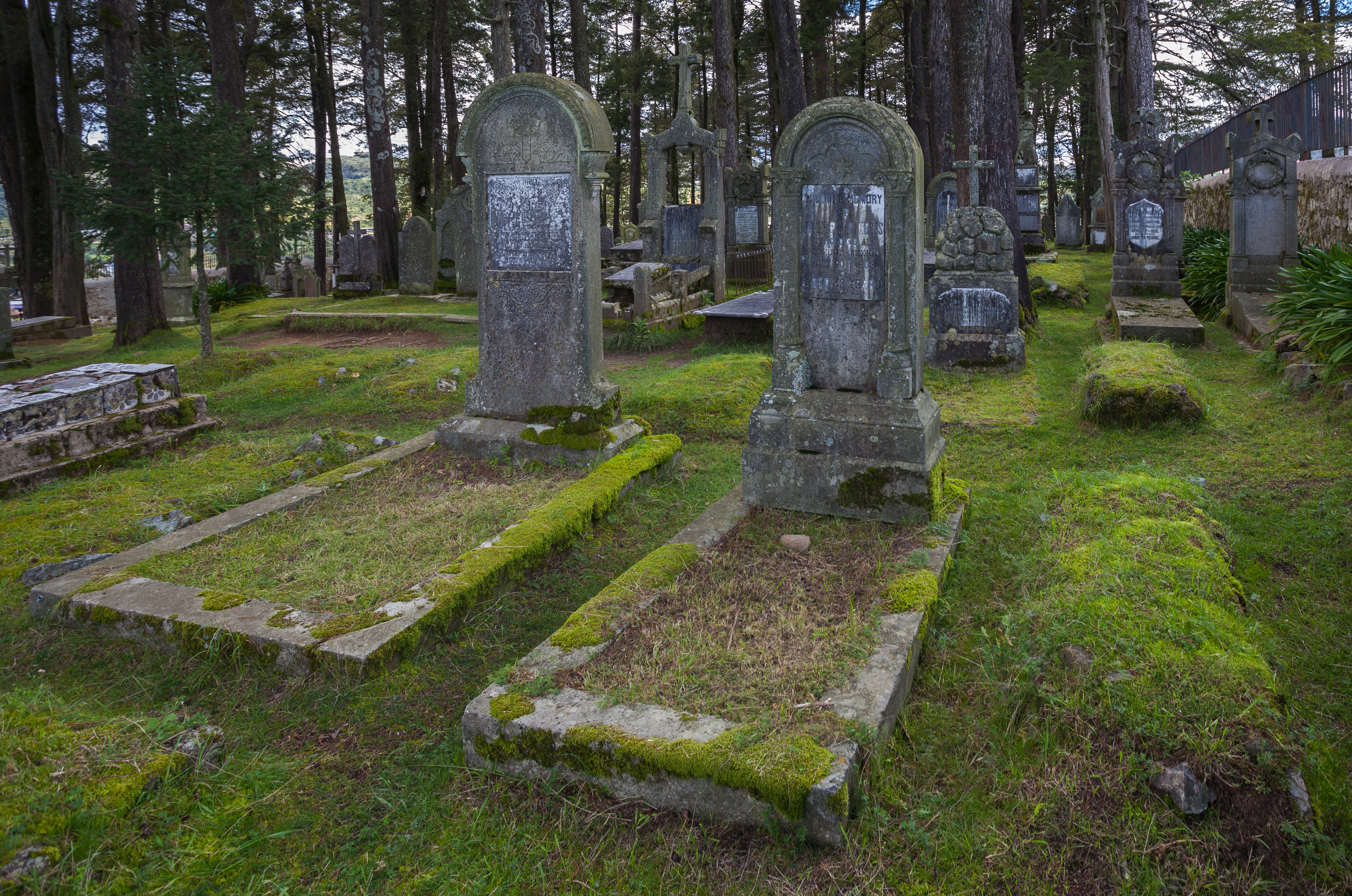
- Panteón Inglés, Real del Monte, Hidalgo

Total population
- 4,572 UK-born residents (2017)

Regions with significant populations
- Mexico City, Veracruz and Hidalgo

Languages
- Mexican Spanish and British English

Religion
- Catholicism • Methodism • Anglicanism

Related ethnic groups
- Other British diasporas

Britons in Mexico, or British Mexicans, are Mexicans of British descent or British-born persons who have become naturalized citizens of Mexico.

The British have had a presence in Mexico since the Colonial era. However, the greatest exchange occurred following independence, notably with the Cornish miners in Hidalgo and the construction of the port of Coatzacoalcos.

== History ==
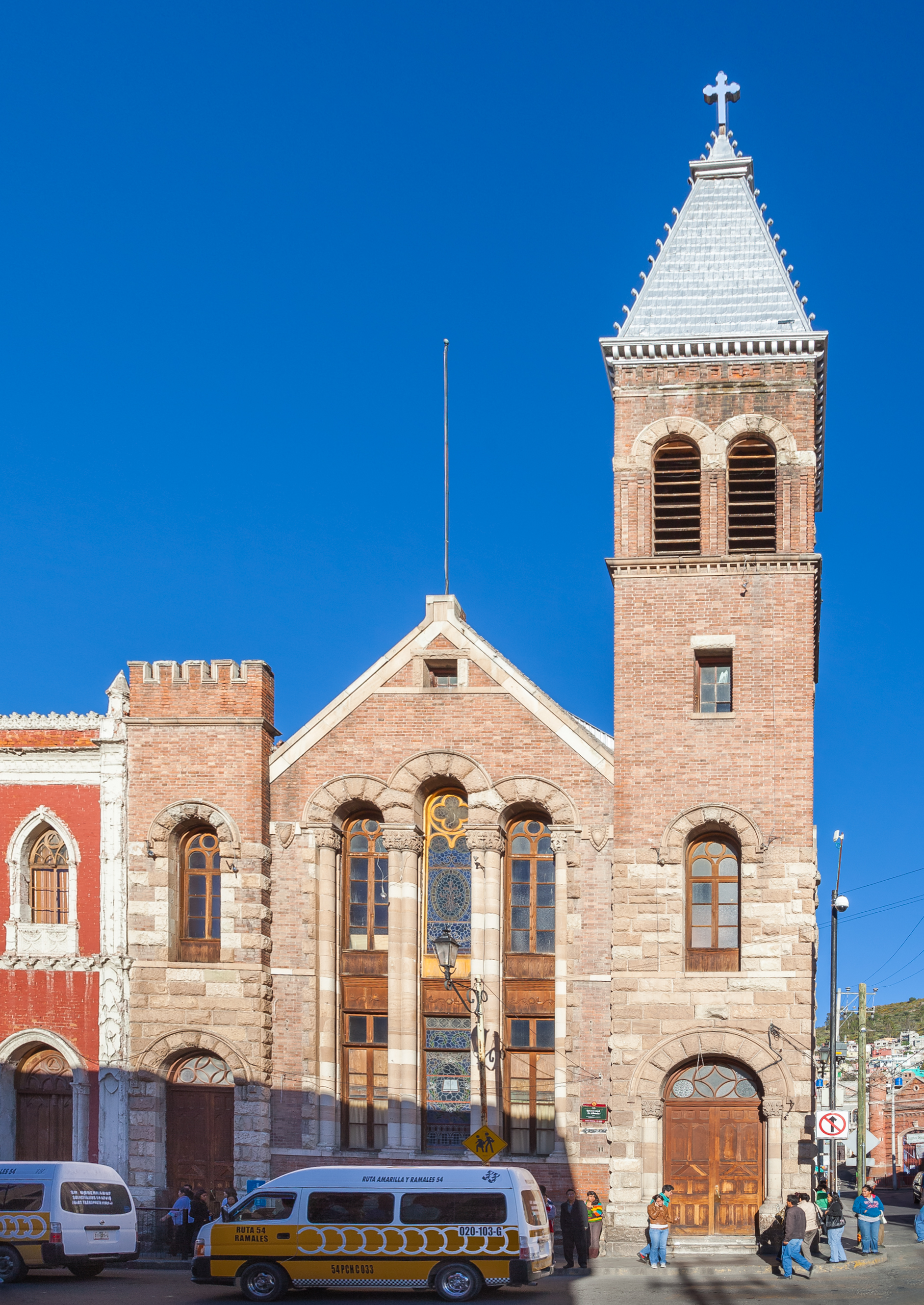
The El Divino Salvador Methodist Church in Pachuca was founded by Cornish immigrants and Mexican converts. The current building was inaugurated in 1901.

During the Colonial era, the Spanish restricted the entrance of other Europeans, however, some non-Spanish Europeans were present. In 1556, the English adventurer Robert Thomson encountered the Scotsman Tomás Blaque (Thomas Blake), who had been living in Mexico City for more than twenty years. Blaque is the first known Briton to have settled in what would become Mexico.

During his third voyage, the ship commanded by John Hawkins of Plymouth escaped destruction at the Battle of San Juan de Ulúa (1568). However, after becoming lost in the Gulf of Mexico and with a bloated crew, Hawkins abandoned more than one hundred men near Tampico. A group of the men went north (including David Ingram), while the rest went south and were captured by the Spanish. Notable among this group was Miles Philips who wrote a narrative detailing his and the other Englishmen's struggles. They were taken to Mexico City, given care at a hospital and imprisoned. After attempting to escape, they were sold as servants or slaves. Some were able to accumulate wealth by rising to the position of overseers at mines and other operations. However, after the establishment of the Mexican Inquisition, the men were stripped of any wealth and imprisoned as Lutheran heretics. Three of the men were burned, while some sixty were given penance.

In southern Baja California Sur, a few families retain the English surname "Green". This surname was established to be descended from Esteban (Steven) Green, an English whaler that settled in the region in 1834 after migrating from the United Kingdom.

The Panteón de Dolores, which became the largest cemetery in Mexico, was founded in 1875 by Juan Manuel Benfield, the son of Anglican immigrants. Benfield fulfilled his father's goal of creating a cemetery after his sister was refused burial in Catholic cemeteries and had to be interred at a beach.

According to the 1895 National Census, 3,263 residents were from the United Kingdom.

The twin silver mining settlements of Pachuca and Real del Monte are being marketed as of 2007 as 'Mexico's Little Cornwall' by the Mexican Embassy in London and represent the first attempt by the Spanish speaking part of the Cornish diaspora to establish formal links with Cornwall in 1824. Real del Monte is twinned with Redruth, Cornwall and Pachuca has a friendship agreement with Camborne, Cornwall. In 2008 thirty members of the Cornish Mexican Cultural Society travelled to Mexico to try and re-trace the path of their ancestors who set off from Cornwall to start a new life in Mexico.

== Culture ==
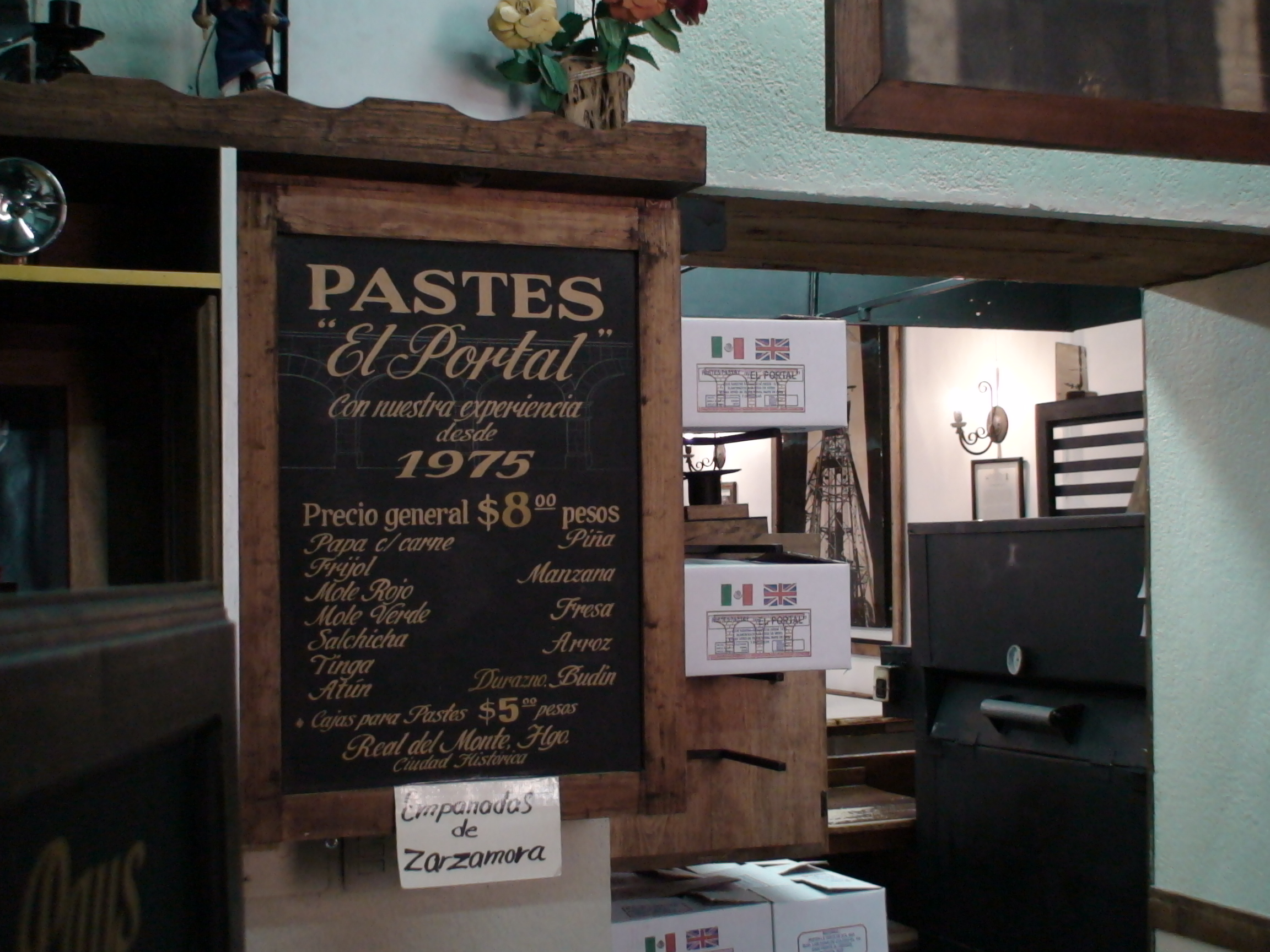
Sign in El Portal pastes shop in Real del Monte.

=== Cuisine ===
The paste is a pastry with Cornish roots. Introduced by miners from Cornwall who were contracted in the towns of Real del Monte and Pachuca in Hidalgo. The Cornish miners may have also introduced the turnip to Mexico.

=== Sports ===
The Cornish introduced institutionalized football to Mexico. A plaque was placed at the site of the first game in Real del Monte. The English also introduced other popular sports such as rugby union, tennis, cricket, polo, and chess. However, cricket lost popularity during World War I, when British expatriates had to leave Mexico to fight. Football clubs founded by Britons included the British Club, Rovers FC Mexico and Reforma Athletic Club. The most successful club founded by Britons is C.F. Pachuca.

== Demographics ==
There were 3,589 UK-born residents in Mexico recorded during the 2010 census, up from the 3,172 individuals counted in the 2000 census. The census only requests place of birth (administrative division or country), the government does not ask its citizens for ancestry nor additional citizenship. According to the British Embassy in Mexico, there were about 15,000 British citizens living in Mexico.

== Institutions ==
British immigrants established several institutions of their own, among others:

- Saint Andrew's Society of Mexico (1893)
- Anglo Mexican Foundation (1943)
- The British Society of Mexico (1828)

== Notable individuals ==
- Bridget Bate Tichenor, painter, fashion editor
- Claudio Brook, actor
- Leonora Carrington, painter, novelist
- Olivia Collins, actress (Chilean mother of British descent)
- Alfred C. Crowle, manager of Mexico's national football team, miner
- Lila Downs, singer, musician (Scottish American father)
- Helen Escobedo, sculptor, installation artist
- Marcelo Flores, footballer (Canadian mother of British descent)
- Alexander Forbes, explorer
- Iliana Fox, actress
- Benjamín G. Hill, military commander during the Mexican Revolution
- Diana Kennedy, expert on Mexican cuisine, cookbook writer
- Ricardo Lancaster-Jones y Verea, historian, diplomat, businessman
- Joy Laville, artist
- Robert Livermore, rancher
- Diego Luna, actor, director, producer
- Rodrigo Millar, footballer (Chilean father of British descent)
- Vas Nuñez, footballer (British father)
- Redvers Opie, economist
- Antonio Pedroza Whitham, footballer
- William Edward Petty Hartnell, wealthy land owner
- Hugo Reid, writer
- William A. Richardson, influential in the development of Yerba Buena
- Azela Robinson, actress
- Guillermo Rivas Rowlatt, character actor
- Marcel Sisniega Campbell, chess Grandmaster
- Beatriz Sheridan, actress, director
- Melanie Smith, artist
- Paco Stanley, TV presenter
- Sussan Taunton, actress (Chilean parents of British descent)
- Jacqueline Voltaire, actress, model, singer
- James E. Hyslop Businessman

== See also ==
- British Honduras
- Immigration to Mexico
- Las Pozas
- Mexicans in the United Kingdom
- Mexico–United Kingdom relations
