= Bolivians in the United Kingdom =

Bolivians in the United Kingdom Bolivianos en el Reino Unido
Total population
- Bolivian-born residents 1,143 (2001 census); 3,765 (2011 census)

Languages
- Spanish (Bolivian Spanish) · Aymara · English (British English)

Religion
- Roman Catholicism · Evangelicalism

Related ethnic groups
- Bolivian diaspora, Latin American Britons

Bolivians in the United Kingdom (Spanish: Bolivianos en el Reino Unido) form a fairly small group, with 3,765 Bolivian-born people living in the UK according to the 2011 Census.

== History ==
=== Settlement ===
Bolivians have been migrating to London since the 1960s. Their emigration from Bolivia is driven by political and economic instability there. The United Kingdom traditionally has not been one of the more popular destinations for emigrant Bolivians; most instead headed for the United States or for other South American countries, especially Argentina and Spain. Since around 2002, there has been a sharp increase in Bolivian migration to Europe, overwhelmingly to Spain although thousands have migrated elsewhere in Europe, including the United Kingdom. Spain has come to be seen as a mere stepping-stone and the United Kingdom as the final destination; despite the common language, Bolivians in Spain perceive the United Kingdom as being more tolerant and welcoming, as well as having higher-paying jobs.

== Demographics ==
=== Population ===
According to the United Kingdom Census 2001, 1,143 people were born in Bolivia, making it the 140th most common birthplace for British residents. The 2011 census recorded 3,618 Bolivian-born residents in England, 24 in Wales, 113 in Scotland and 10 in Northern Ireland. In 2007, community leaders surveyed by the International Organization for Migration (IOM) estimated that there might have been as many as 25,000 Bolivian-born people in the UK.

=== Distribution ===
According to an IOM mapping exercise published in 2007, the overwhelming majority of all Bolivians in the United Kingdom reside in London. According to the report, boroughs with high concentrations of Bolivians included Southwark (mainly in Elephant and Castle, Old Kent Road and Peckham Rye), Haringey (mainly in Seven Sisters and Finsbury Park), Camden, Lewisham and Lambeth (mainly in Vauxhall and Brixton). More affluent Bolivians were reported as tending to gravitate towards North London, while the less affluent lived in Southeast London. Outside of London, other concentrations were identified in Newcastle and Edinburgh.

== Employment ==
Work in the cleaning industry is a common entry-level jobs for new Bolivian arrivals; others find employment as private nannies or in restaurants. Many Bolivians on student visas report working as many as 60 hours per week, or three times the legal limit.

Many Bolivian migrants reside and work in the United Kingdom without authorisation. However, instead of making use of the services of people smugglers or other similar means to effect illegal entry into the country, many Bolivians enter the United Kingdom visa-free as tourists, and then simply overstay their entry period and find a job. Others enter on student visas which allow them to work up to 20 hours per week. Long-term legal Bolivian residents of the United Kingdom do not necessarily have a negative attitude towards the recently arrived irregular migrants; in contrast, they often do what they can to help them out in finding accommodation and employment, regardless of legality. False documents are said to be fairly easy to acquire, and are becoming of increasing importance as employers become less willing to knowingly hire illegal migrants. A plan by the UK government to offer an amnesty to Bolivians residing in the country illegally was discarded in September 2007.

== Culture ==
=== Community ===
Long-term Bolivian residents of the United Kingdom have set up a number of community associations, such as the Anglo-Bolivian Society and the Friends of Bolivia. However, most recent migrants surveyed state that they have never heard anything about those organisations. However, many migrants have organised themselves into football teams which play against each other and even against Bolivian teams from Spain.

The Bolivian community in the United Kingdom is divided along lines of ethnicity and social class. According to community leaders, divisions between kollas (highlanders of Aymara indigenous origin) and cambas (of Spanish or mixed descent) remain salient, although less important among youth. Furthermore, what social class one actually belongs to in the UK on the basis of one's income and lifestyle is often less relevant than the perception by other Bolivians of what social class one belonged to in Bolivia; migration to a new country means that both lower-class and upper-class Bolivians find themselves working in the same low-level jobs. One interviewee who came from an affluent family in Bolivia, but worked as a cleaner after arriving in the United Kingdom, described a situation where her supervisor, who was from a working-class family, still addressed her as señora and using the formal 2nd-person pronoun usted, whereas he used the informal 2nd-person pronoun tú with his other subordinates and colleagues.

=== Media ===
The United Kingdom has no publications either in Spanish or English aimed specifically at Bolivians. Bolivians, even those who do not have a good grasp of English, almost all report that they read the free English-language dailies, such as the Metro or thelondonpaper, as well as the weekly Spanish-language daily Express News. 60% also read newspapers from Bolivia online, mainly El Deber, La Razón, and Los Tiempos.

== See also ==
- Bolivia–United Kingdom relations
- Latin American British
- Demographics of Bolivia
- Bolivian American
- Latin American migration to the United Kingdom
