= Ecuadorians in the United Kingdom =

Ecuadorians in the United Kingdom Ecuatorianos en el Reino Unido
Total population
- Ecuadorian-born residents 9,422 (2015 UN estimate)

Regions with significant populations
- London and South East England

Languages
- British English, Ecuadorian Spanish, Spanglish and Other Languages of Ecuador

Religion
- Roman Catholic, Protestantism, Mormon

Related ethnic groups
- Ecuadorian people • Latin Americans in the United Kingdom • Mestizo • Amerindian • Mulatto • Spaniards in the United Kingdom • Hispanic • Latino

Ecuadorians in the United Kingdom (Spanish: Ecuatorianos en el Reino Unido) include people of Ecuadorian ancestry living in the United Kingdom, who have been born or raised in the UK. They can be either British citizens or non-citizen immigrants.

== Demographics ==
=== Population and distribution ===
The 2001 Census recorded 3,035 Ecuadorian-born people living in the UK. More recent estimates of the size of the Ecuadorian population in the UK vary. In 2006, The Independent newspaper put the figure at around 10,000. Several other sources estimate the population including British-born people of Ecuadorian origin to be higher. NGO representatives and community members believe it is in the range of 30,000 to 75,000, whilst the Ecuadorian Consulate in London states around 70,000. Latin American author Sofia Buchuck estimates between 70,000 and 90,000. However, Ecuadorians do not feature in Office for National Statistics estimates for the top 60 foreign countries of birth in 2008, meaning that there are fewer than 20,000 Ecuadorian-born people resident in the UK.

The overwhelming majority of Ecuadorians in the UK can be found in London, with the Ecuadorian Consulate estimating that 80 to 90 per cent live in the capital. Lambeth, Southwark, Newham and Haringey are the most populous boroughs within Greater London.

=== Ethnicity and religion ===
	Ecuadorians granted British citizenship
1998	33
1999	39
2000	43
2001	55
2002	80
2003	200
2004	325
2005	655
2006	955
2007	745
2008	580

The majority of Ecuadorian British people are mestizos of Andean origin. It is a predominantly Christian community, and is served by over 20 Latin American churches in London (with more across the UK). Comunidad Cristiana de Londres has over 5,000 largely Ecuadorian members.

Number of applications by Ecuadorians for asylum in the United Kingdom (1993–2003) (All figures are rounded to the nearest five)
Year	1993	1994	1995	1996	1997	1998	1999	2000	2001	2002	2003
Number of applications	60	105	250	435	1,205	280	610	445	255	315	150
Number recognised as refugees	0	0	0	0	0	0	0	25	10	20	5
Number granted exceptional leave	0	0	<5	0	<5	10	0	20	10	10	10
Number refused asylum	<5	15	35	105	740	1,000	135	650	490	290	220

== Community ==
=== Culture ===
The cultural capital of Ecuadorians in the UK is Elephant and Castle in London where the areas main shopping centre has many Ecuadorian stalls and shops that sell Ecuadorian produce and craft work. In the same district, Ecuadorian-owned hairdressers, money transfer and community centres, clothing importers and music stores can be found. Alongside Elephant and Castle, a significant number of Ecuadorian restaurants can be found in London, most notably in Seven Sisters and on Holloway Road. The Carnaval del Pueblo, which is Europe's largest celebration of Latin American culture, has a significant input from the Ecuadorian community.

== Notable people ==
Pedro Vicente Maldonado — Died in London in 1748 and is interred in the St.James's Church, Piccadilly. Maldonado Walk in Southwark, was named after his memory.

== See also ==
- Ecuadorian diaspora
- Ecuadorian American
