= Mexicans in the United Kingdom =

Ethnic group in United Kingdom

Mexicans in the United Kingdom Mexicanos en el Reino Unido
Total population
- Mexican-born residents 9,771 (2011 UK Census)

Regions with significant populations
- London, South East England

Languages
- British English, Mexican Spanish, Spanglish

Religion
- Predominantly Roman Catholicism; Minority Protestantism, Atheism

Related ethnic groups
- Mexican diaspora • Latin American Britons • British Mexicans

Mexicans in the United Kingdom or Mexican Britons (Spanish: Mexicanos en el Reino Unido) include Mexican-born immigrants to the United Kingdom and their British-born descendants. Although a large percentage of Mexican-born people in the UK are international students, many are also permanently settled and work in the UK as the community expands into its second generation.

== Demographics and population ==
According to the 2001 UK Census, 5,049 Mexican-born people were living in the UK. The 2011 census recorded 8,869 Mexican-born residents in England, 620 in Scotland, 196 in Wales, and 86 in Northern Ireland.

According to the Institute for Mexicans Abroad, there is a slight gender imbalance in the population: 47% of Mexican-born people resident in the UK are male and 53% female. Students make up around 40% of the population, whilst 13% are working in the UK. Spouses and children combined make up 9% of the Mexican-born population in the UK. The Institute for Mexicans Abroad has identified London as having the largest Mexican community in the UK as well as the most diverse, with many not registering with the consulate. There are significant numbers of Mexican students in the university towns of Sheffield, Oxford, Cambridge, Warwick, Manchester and Liverpool. There is evidence of increasing numbers of British nationals illegally employing Mexican domestic workers without valid work permits.

Number of Mexicans granted British citizenship (1998–2008)
| Year | 1998 | 1999 | 2000 | 2001 | 2002 | 2003 | 2004 | 2005 | 2006 | 2007 | 2008 |
|---|---|---|---|---|---|---|---|---|---|---|---|
| Number | 52 | 74 | 116 | 100 | 105 | 145 | 160 | 175 | 145 | 135 | 115 |

== Culture and community ==
There are numerous Mexican-run associations, organisations and clubs in the UK. MexSoc UK was established by Mexican postgraduate students in the UK and arranges academic, sporting and social events year-round that involve no fewer than twenty British universities. Exatec UK is an alumni organisation for former students of the Monterrey Institute of Technology and Higher Education living in the UK. The British Mexican Society is a long-established Mexican association, formed in 1942 by Mexico's Ambassador to the UK. It remains a strong promoter of the culture of Mexico in the UK and organises many charitable events. Mexico Amigo is another example of a group established by Mexicans in the UK that specialises in fund-raising events. It was set up in 1990 by a number of London-based Mexicans.

== Notable individuals ==
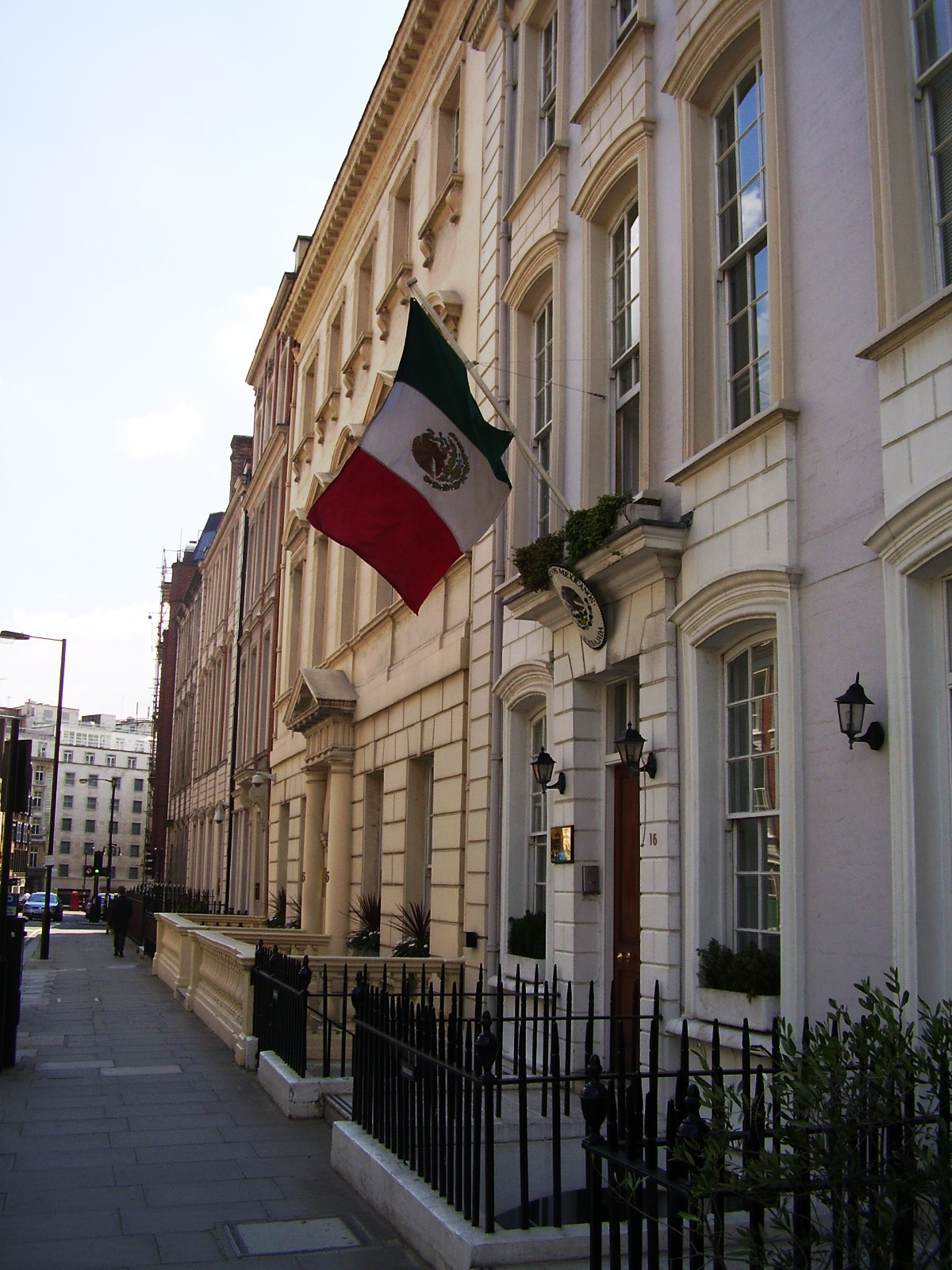
The Mexican Embassy in Mayfair, London.

== See also ==
- British immigration to Mexico
- Latin Americans in the United Kingdom
- Mexico – United Kingdom relations
