= Charles Stirling (diplomat) =

British diplomat (1901–1986)

Sir Charles Stirling KCMG KVCO

British Ambassador to Portugal
- In office 1955–1960
- Preceded by: Sir Nigel Ronald
- Succeeded by: Sir Archibald Ross

British Ambassador to Chile
- In office 1951–1954
- Preceded by: Sir Bertrand Jerram
- Succeeded by: Sir Charles Empson

Personal details
- Born: 19 November 1901
- Died: 5 April 1986 (aged 84)
- Children: 3
- Education: Corpus Christi College, Oxford
- Occupation: Diplomat

Sir Charles Norman Stirling (19 November 1901 – 5 April 1986) was a British diplomat who served as ambassador to Chile from 1951 to 1954 and ambassador to Portugal from 1955 to 1960.

== Early life and education ==
Stirling was born on 19 November 1901, the eldest son of F. H. Stirling of British Colombia. He was educated at Wellington College and Corpus Christi College, Oxford.

== Career ==
Stirling joined the Diplomatic Service in 1925, and was posted to Prague as third secretary. He was then transferred to Peking in 1928, and there promoted to second secretary in 1930. After a three year spell at the Foreign Office, he was sent to Sofia in 1936 where he acted as chargé d'affaires in 1936 and 1937, and was promoted to first secretary in 1937.

After returning to the Foreign Office, Stirling was attached to the Export Credits Guarantee Department in 1938. The following year, he was seconded to the Ministry of Economic Warfare and headed the Neutral Trade department with the rank of assistant secretary. In 1942, he returned to the Foreign Office as acting counsellor heading the French department, and in 1946, was promoted to counsellor and posted to Lisbon where he also served as chargé d'affaires in 1947 and 1948. In 1949, he was appointed consul-general at Tangier.

From 1951 to 1954, Stirling served as ambassador to Chile. In 1955, he was appointed ambassador to Portugal, a post he held until his retirement in 1960.

== Personal life and death ==
Stirling married Ann Moore in 1950 and they had two daughters and a son.

Stirling died on 5 April 1986, aged 84.

== Honours ==
- Stirling was appointed Companion of the Order of St Michael and St George (CMG) in the 1941 New Year Honours, and promoted to Knight Commander (KCMG) in the 1955 New Year Honours.
- He was appointed Knight Commander of the Royal Victorian Order (KCVO) in 1957.

== See also ==
- Chile–United Kingdom relations
- Portugal–United Kingdom relations

Diplomatic posts
Preceded by Sir Bertrand Jerram	British Ambassador to Chile; 1951–1954	Succeeded by Sir Charles Empson
Preceded by Sir Nigel Ronald	British Ambassador to Portugal; 1955–1960	Succeeded by Sir Archibald Ross
