= Captain Kennedy =

Captain Kennedy may refer to:

- Archibald Kennedy, 11th Earl of Cassilis (bef. 1736–died 1794), Scottish peer who lived in the English colony of New York
- Arthur Kennedy (governor) (1809–1883), British colonial administrator who served as governor of a number of British colonies
- William Kennedy (explorer) (1814–1890), Canadian fur trader, politician, and historian who captained the steamship Isabella
- Edward Kennedy (Royal Navy officer) (1879–1939), Royal Navy sailor
- Inga Kennedy (born 1962), Scottish nurse and senior Royal Navy officer
- Captain Kennedy, a band that performed at the 2011 Forfey Festival
- “Captain Kennedy”, a song by Neil Young from the album Hawks & Doves
