= Admiral Robinson =

Admiral Robinson may refer to:

- Adam M. Robinson Jr. (born 1950), U.S. Navy vice admiral
- Cloudesley Varyl Robinson (1883–1959), British Royal Navy rear admiral
- Eric Gascoigne Robinson (1882–1965), British Royal Navy rear admiral
- Frederick Robinson (Royal Navy officer) (1836–1896), British Royal Navy vice admiral
- Guy Robinson (born 1967), British Royal Navy vice admiral
- Mark Robinson (Royal Navy officer) (1722–1799), British Royal Navy rear admiral
- Rembrandt C. Robinson (1924–1972), U.S. Navy rear admiral
- Robert Spencer Robinson (1809–1889), British Royal Navy admiral
- Samuel Robison (1867–1952), U.S. Navy admiral
- Samuel Murray Robinson (1882–1972), U.S. Navy admiral
- Sir Tancred Robinson, 3rd Baronet (c. 1685–1754), British Royal Navy rear admiral
