= Edward Kennedy (Royal Navy officer) =

Royal Navy officer

Captain Edward Coverley Kennedy
- Born: 31 August 1879
- Died: 23 November 1939 (aged 60); HMS Rawalpindi, Atlantic Ocean
- Relatives: Ludovic Kennedy (son)
- Military career
- Allegiance: United Kingdom
- Branch: Royal Navy
- Service years: 1892–1921, 1939
- Rank: Captain
- Nickname: K
- Commands: HMS New Zealand; HMS Angora; HMS Cassandra; HMS Constance; HMS Rawalpindi
- Conflicts: First World War Russian Civil War: Allied intervention; Second World War: Atlantic War †
- Other work: Political Agent

Edward Coverley Kennedy (31 August 1879 – 23 November 1939) was a Royal Navy officer who is remembered as the captain of the armed merchant cruiser HMS Rawalpindi who engaged the German battleships Scharnhorst and Gneisenau.

== Early life and background ==
Edward Coverley Kennedy was born 31 August 1879, only son (there were two daughters) of Edward Briggs Kennedy (1842-1914), of Deanyers, Hall Lane, Upper Farringdon, near Alton, Hampshire, and Caroline Edith (died 1935), daughter of Colville Coverley Jackson (1804-1858), a magistrate and collector in the Bengal Civil Service, sometime of Agra, and granddaughter of Sir John Jackson, 1st Baronet, a politician and director of the East India Company. Edward Briggs Kennedy's three brothers all distinguished themselves in their respective fields; elder brothers Sir John Gordon Kennedy and Admiral Sir William Robert Kennedy were an eminent diplomat and a senior Royal Navy commander, respectively; younger brother Gilbert George Kennedy was a police magistrate who had played international football for Scotland. After Harrow, Edward Briggs Kennedy went to Queensland, Australia, where he spent less than a year with the Queensland Native Police, being appointed acting sub-inspector in 1865 and resigning that same year; in 1869, with two friends, he founded a sugar plantation and mill at Mackay on the Pioneer River in Queensland. He returned to England, and wrote four books about his Australian life and the police force, the first, Four Years in Queensland, published in 1870. In 1912 he and his wife founded the Farringdon Rifle Club. The four brothers were great-grandsons of Archibald Kennedy, 11th Earl of Cassilis.

== Early career ==
Edward Coverley Kennedy entered the Royal Navy as a naval cadet in 1892.

Beginning his career in HMS Britannia, he first served at sea in 1894, rising to midshipman in 1895 and serving in that capacity in the China Station. His rise up the ranks continued, becoming sub-lieutenant in 1898 and lieutenant in 1900. In this period he saw service in the battleship HMS Collingwood, at the Royal Naval College, Osborne and in the flagship of the North America and West Indies Station.

In 1912, Kennedy was promoted to commander and early in 1913 became the executive officer in HMS Antrim. Antrim was the flagship of Rear Admiral William Pakenham, commander of the Third Cruiser Squadron.

== First World War and later career ==
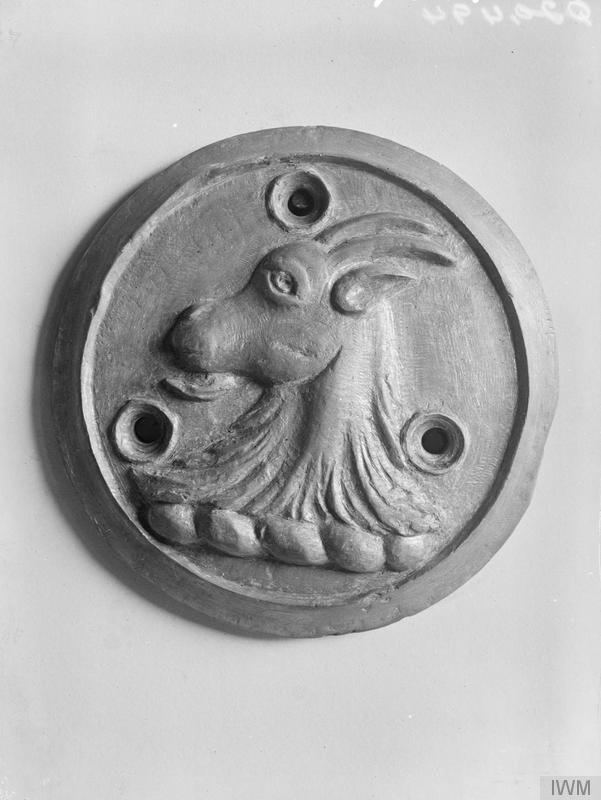
Ship badge for the Angora

During the First World War Kennedy was transferred to the battle cruiser New Zealand in 1916. However, he missed the opportunity to participate in the Battle of Jutland due to being in hospital at the time of the battle. During his time in the New Zealand, Kennedy was given the temporary command of the ship with rank of captain. His rank of captain was made permanent in 1917 but he remained as executive officer in the New Zealand upon the return of the captain. This remained the case until May 1918 when he was made captain of HMS Angora, a minelayer converted from a merchant ship.

From the Angora he was placed in command of the Sixth Light cruiser Squadron's Cassandra. In this period he was present to witness the surrender of the German High Seas Fleet. He commanded the Cassandra as part of the Allied Intervention in Russia. It was during this operation that she was sunk on 5 December 1918 by a sea mine in the Baltic with the loss of 11 of her crew. The wreck of HMS Cassandra was discovered in 2010 by the Estonian Navy.

In the period 1919–1920 he returned to the America and West Indies Station to command the light cruiser Constance. On 7 July 1919 riots broke out in Kingston, Jamaica. Constance landed armed personnel and restored order following a confrontation on 18 July. During the hand-to-hand fighting five or six sailors from the ship were injured.

Kennedy and Constance also took part in quelling disturbances in Belize. Tuesday 22 July 1919 saw veterans from the British Honduras Contingant, recently returned from service in the Middle East, march through the Belize Town. They smashed the plate glass of the ten largest merchant stores before cutting the power to the town. This triggered a night of looting and violence. British officials telegraphed Constance for assistance. On Friday 25 July, Claude Smith had called a public meeting to discuss labour demands. The meeting was broken up when local police and Royal Marines from Constance arrived to arrest him.

Kennedy also saw service on land, commanding a battalion of naval reservists at Newport during a 1921 strike. Kennedy was placed on the retired list in 1921. This was done as part of economies recommended by the Geddes Committee. The committee was chaired by Sir Eric Geddes and the cuts dubbed the Geddes Axe. In retirement Kennedy worked for the Conservative Party. He was a political agent in Hemel Hempstead and in 1929 for the Wycombe Division in Buckinghamshire.

== Second World War and HMS Rawalpindi ==
With the outbreak of the Second World War, 60-year-old Kennedy returned to serve in the Royal Navy. He was described in his obituary in The Times by a friend referred to there as R.B. who spoke of Kennedy's 'happiness and pride' upon being given command of the Rawalpindi. R.B. noted Kennedy as saying "They've given me some fine guns...and in this war, I'm going to use them". In a letter posted on 21 November 1939, Kennedy wrote "I am as content as it is possible to be".

The Rawalpindi served as part of the Northern Patrol enforcing the blockade of Germany. On 23 November 1939 at 15.30 the ship was sailing to the south-east of Iceland when an enemy ship was sighted. Kennedy is described as examining the scene through his binoculars and saying, "It's the Deutschland all right". Initial reports attributed the sinking of the Rawalpindi to the German ship Deutschland. However, these reports were later corrected to state that it was actually the battle-cruisers Scharnhorst and Gneisenau. Despite being hopelessly outgunned, Captain Kennedy decided to fight, rather than surrender as demanded by the Germans. He was heard to say "We’ll fight them both, they’ll sink us, and that will be that. Good-bye".

Smoke floats were deployed with a view to the Rawalpindi making good an escape. However, a second German ship came into view to the starboard side. They called on the Rawalpindi to stop; when this was rejected they fired a shot across her bow. When the British ship continued the Germans engaged with their large guns and the Rawalpindi fired her six-inch guns in reply. The third salvo knocked out the Rawalpindi's electric system (which stopped the ammunition winches) and was followed by a salvo destroying the bridge and wireless room. After 30 to 40 minutes of bombardment, all guns were out of action and the Rawalpindi was well ablaze. She remained afloat until 20.00 when the ship capsized and sank with the loss of 263 men. Around 30 survivors were reported as being taken prisoner but 11 men were rescued by the armed merchant cruiser HMS Chitral.

For his gallantry Captain Kennedy was posthumously mentioned in despatches.

== Personal life ==
In 1918, Kennedy married Rosalind Margaret Innes Grant (1893-1977), daughter of Sir Ludovic Grant, 11th Baronet. They had two daughters and a son, Ludovic Kennedy who became a celebrated journalist. Captain Kennedy was a keen hunter, known to be a crack shot and a fine fisherman. His friend R. B. noted in his obituary that 'with a dog at his heels, or with a rod in his hand he was in his element'.
