= John Leche =

British diplomat (1889–1960)

Sir John Hurleston Leche KCMG OBE

British Ambassador to Chile
- In office 1945–1949
- Preceded by: Sir Charles Orde
- Succeeded by: Sir Bertrand Jerram

Personal details
- Born: 21 November 1889
- Died: 12 May 1960 (aged 70) Malpas, Cheshire
- Children: 5
- Occupation: Diplomat

Sir John Hurleston Leche (21 November 1889 – 12 May 1960) was a British diplomat who served as Minister to the Central American Republics from 1939 to 1945 and Ambassador to Chile from 1945 to 1949.

== Early life and education ==
Leche was born on 21 November 1889, the son of John Hurleston Leche of Chester and Kathleen Hudson. He was educated at Eton College and the Royal Military Academy Sandhurst.

== Career ==
Leche joined the 12th Royal Lancers in 1910. During World War I, he served in France and was GSO III officer in Intelligence. He was awarded the Order of the British Empire (Military), the Order of the Crown of Belgium, and was mentioned twice in despatches.

Leche entered the Diplomatic Service in 1919 and served at Paris, Rio de Janeiro and Buenos Aires and elsewhere. After working as counsellor at the Foreign Office, he then served at Bern, Madrid and Guatemala. In 1937, he was appointed chargé d'affaires in the Spanish Republican Government controlled area of Spain during the Spanish Civil War and later that year was promoted to Minister Plenipotentiary, succeeding Sir George Ogilvie Forbes. Facing many challenges, he served first at Valencia before removing with the government to Barcelona, holding the post until 1938.

From 1939 to 1945, Leche was Minister and Consul-General to the Central American Republics which included Guatemala, Honduras, Nicaragua and El Salvador but not Costa Rica and Panama. Based in Guatemala, he arrived when Britain was in a dispute with the country over its alleged breach of certain terms of the Anglo-Guatemalan Convention of 1859. Leche, in his final year, gave sanctuary for several days at the diplomatic mission to the deposed President of Guatemala, Jorge Ubico and his wife before they were smuggled out of the country to New Orleans. He then served as Ambassador to Chile from 1945 to 1949.

== Personal life and death ==
Leche was married three times. First, to Amy Unthank in 1916, who died in 1927. They had a daughter. Second, to Helen Janney in 1928, who died in 1952. They had two sons and two daughters. Third, to Mrs Helen Kerrison, née Donaldson-Hudson, in 1953, who died in 1957.

Leche died on 12 May 1960 at Malpas, Cheshire, aged 70.

== Honours ==
Leche was appointed Companion of the Order of St Michael and St George (CMG) in the 1937 New Year Honours, and promoted to Knight Commander (KCMG) in the 1949 Birthday Honours. He was appointed Officer of the Order of the British Empire (OBE) (Military) in the 1919 Birthday Honours and awarded the Order of the Crown of Belgium.

== See also ==
- Guatemala–United Kingdom relations
- Chile–United Kingdom relations

Diplomatic posts
| Preceded by Sir Charles Orde | British Ambassador to Chile; 1945–1949 | Succeeded by Sir Bertrand Jerram |
