= British migration to Portugal =

British citizens in Portugal
Total population
- British nationals 49,000 (2006)

Regions with significant populations
- Algarve, Madeira

Languages
- English, Portuguese

Religion
- Anglicanism, Protestantism and Catholicism

Related ethnic groups
- Britons, British diaspora

British migration to Portugal has resulted in Portugal being home to one of the largest British-born populations outside of the United Kingdom. Migration from the UK to Portugal has increased rapidly since the late 1990s and the estimated population of British nationals in Portugal in 2006 was 49,000, including 11,000 living in Portugal for part of the year.

== Education ==
There are a few British international schools located in Portugal, mainly the Oporto British School, St. Julian's School and Saint Dominic's International School.

== Media ==
There are several English printed newspapers available in Portugal, The Portugal News is an English-language weekly newspaper, which is the oldest in publication in Portugal.

== Retirement ==
The United Kingdom and Portugal signed the UK/Portugal Income Tax convention in 1968 which was created to avoid Double taxation, meaning that British citizens who have Tax residence in Portugal, do not pay tax on their income from foreign sources such as pensions for the first 10 years.

== See also ==
- British diaspora
- Demographics of Portugal
- Portuguese in the United Kingdom
- Portugal–United Kingdom relations
