= Bertrand Jerram =

British diplomat

Sir Cecil Bertrand Jerram, KCMG (22 October 1891 – 28 January 1971) was a British diplomat who served as British ambassador to Austria and to Chile.

Jerram was educated at King's School, Canterbury, and Pembroke College, Cambridge. He joined the diplomatic service in 1913 as a student interpreter. He was appointed Consul for Estonia in 1928, Commercial Secretary at Helsingfors in 1931, and Commercial Secretary at Warsaw in 1933.

Jerram was appointed a Companion of the Order of St Michael and St George (CMG) in the 1938 New Year Honours, at which point he was serving as Commercial Counsellor in Madrid and assistant to the UK Agent to General Franco. He was them appointed Commercial Counsellor in Buenos Aires in 1939.

In 1945 Jerram was appointed UK Ambassador to Sweden. He was promoted to Knight Commander of the Order of St Michael and St George (KCMG) in the 1947 Birthday Honours.

Jerram was appointed Envoy Extraordinary and Minister Plenipotentiary to Austria in 1948.

In 1952, he served as the head of delegation for the United Kingdom delegation to the 1952 ITU Plenipotentiary Conference in Buenos Aires, Argentina.

His brothers were Lieutenant-Colonel Charles Frederic Jerram, CMG, DSO, Royal Marines, and Rear-Admiral Sir Rowland Christopher Jerram KBE, DSO, DL, Royal Navy. Two uncles were Admiral Sir Thomas Henry Martyn Jerram and Edward Frederick Knight.

Diplomatic posts
Preceded by Victor Mallet	Minister to Sweden; 1945–1948	Succeeded by Harold Farquhar
Preceded by Henry Mack	British Ambassador to Austria; 1948–1949	Succeeded by Harold Caccia
Preceded by John Leche	British Ambassador to Chile; 1949–1951	Succeeded by Charles Stirling
