= Robert Walters (mayor) =

Mayor of New York City

35th Mayor of New York City
- In office 1720–1725
- Preceded by: Jacobus Van Cortlandt
- Succeeded by: Johannes Jansen

Personal details
- Spouse: Catherine Leisler (after 1685)

Robert Walters (born before 1685 – died 1733) was the mayor of New York City from 1720 to 1725.

== Early life ==
Walters was likely born in Plymouth, England, and emigrated to British America, where he was a resident of New York City by 1685.

== Career ==
Walters became a wealthy businessman and, in 1698, he was appointed to the Council by Richard Coote, 1st Earl of Bellomont, Governor of the Province of New York. When Judge Abraham de Peyster recused himself due to conflicts of interest due to his extensive holdings, Walters was chosen to substitute on the Supreme Court of Judicature. He also substituted for Judge Stephen Van Cortlandt when Van Cortlandt was ill.

Upon William Atwood's swearing in as Chief Judge on August 5, 1701, Walters was appointed Third Judge. As a member of the court, he was part of the group that tried and condemned to death Col. Nicholas Bayard and John Hutchins for treason. The resulting uproar led to his suspension on June 9, 1702, from both the Court and the Governor's Council.

In 1710, however, he was again appointed to the Governor's Council and in 1718, was commissioned as Second Judge of the Supreme Court of Judicature, remaining on the bench until his death in 1733. From 1720 to 1725, he served as the mayor of New York City. In 1720, while mayor, a tax of two percent was "raised on all goods coming from Europe."

== Personal life ==
On February 4, 1685, he married Catherine Leisler (b. November 8, 1665), daughter of Jacob Leisler. Together, they were the parents of:

- Elizabeth Walter (born 1685), who married Johannes Wendell.
- Maria Walter (1689–1764), who first married Arent Schuyler. After his death, she married Archibald Kennedy (1685–1763) and became the mother of Archibald Kennedy, who later became the 11th Earl of Cassilis.
- Jacob Walter, who married Elizabeth Oliver.
- Sara Walter, who married John Schuyler.

Walters died in 1733 in New York City and was buried at Woodlawn Cemetery.
