= Harold Farquhar =

British diplomat (1894–1953)

Sir Harold Lister Farquhar KCMG MC
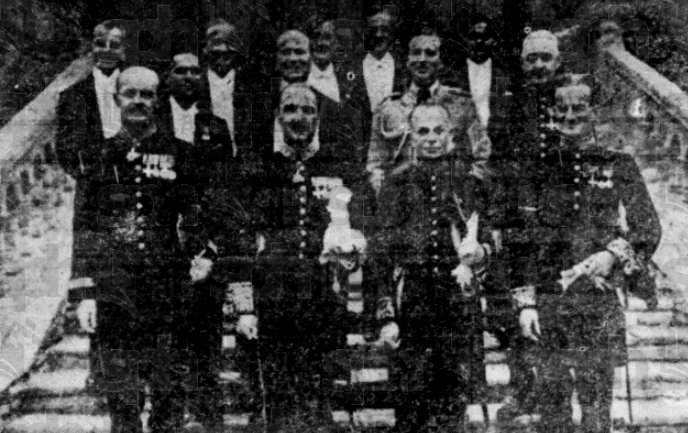
- Farquhar (front left) with John Le Rougetel (front second left) British Ambassador to Persia on the presentation of his credentials in Teheran in 1946

British Ambassador to Sweden
- In office 1948–1951
- Preceded by: Sir Bertrand Jerram
- Succeeded by: Sir Roger Stevens

Personal details
- Born: 15 April 1894
- Died: 31 January 1953 (aged 58) Market Harborough, Leicestershire
- Children: 2
- Education: Magdalen College, Oxford
- Occupation: Diplomat

Sir Harold Lister Farquhar (15 April 1894 – 31 January 1953) was a British diplomat who served as Minister to the Ethiopian Empire from 1946 to 1948 and Ambassador to Sweden from 1948 to 1951.

== Early life and education ==
Farquhar was born on 15 April 1894, the son of Ernest Farquhar of Whiteway House, Devon. He was educated at Eton College and Magdalen College, Oxford.

== Career ==
Farquhar served in World War I in Europe with the rank of 2nd Lieutenant in the Life Guards and Lieutenant in the Coldstream Guards and was awarded the Military Cross. After the War, he served with the rank of Captain on the general staff of the Army of Occupation from 1918 to 1922.

Farquhar entered the Diplomatic Service in 1922. He served in British missions in Warsaw, Madrid, Budapest, Rome, Mexico, Bucharest, Cairo and Tehran. After being posted to the Foreign Office in 1939, he served as Consul-General at Barcelona from 1941 to 1945, and Minister (head of mission) to the Ethiopian Empire at Addis Ababa from 1946 to 1948. He served as British Ambassador to Sweden from 1948 until 1951 when he retired from the post due to ill health.

== Personal life and death ==
Farquhar married Constance Capell in 1917 and they had two sons.

Farquhar died on 31 January 1953, at Market Harborough, Leicestershire, aged 58.

== Honours ==
Farquhar was appointed Companion of the Order of St Michael and St George (CMG) in the 1945 New Year Honours, and promoted to Knight Commander (KCMG) in the 1950 New Year Honours. In the 1919 Birthday Honours, he was awarded the Military Cross (MC) in connection with military operations in France and Flanders.

== See also ==
- Sweden–United Kingdom relations

Diplomatic posts
Preceded by Sir Bertrand Jerram	British Ambassador to Sweden; 1948–1951	Succeeded by Sir Roger Stevens
