= Glynne Evans =

British diplomat and security adviser

Dame Madelaine Glynne Dervel Evans, DBE, CMG (born 23 August 1944) is a British retired diplomat and security adviser.

== Career ==
Evans graduated from the University of St Andrews with a Bachelor of Arts (BA) degree in 1966 and completed a doctorate (PhD) at University College London in 1971 with a thesis entitled "The Landed Aristocracy in Peru, 1600–1680". She joined the Foreign and Commonwealth Office in 1971 as a Second Secretary and was posted to Buenos Aires the following year; promotion to First Secretary followed in 1975.

In 1977, she returned to the FCO as Private Secretary to the Parliamentary Under-Secretary of State. She was posted in New York, firstly to the UN Security Security Council Secretariat in 1978 and then as First Secretary to UK Mission to the United Nations (1979–82). She was subsequently a Counsellor at the Foreign Office and then, from 1987 to 1990, Counsellor to the Mission in Brussels. From 1990 to 1996, she was Head of the UN Department at the Foreign Office, and was then Ambassador to Chile (1997–2000) and Portugal (2001–04). After retiring from the Diplomatic Service, she became a Senior Adviser to the Olive Group Ltd in 2006 and Restrata Ltd in 2013.

A Companion of the Order of St Michael and St George since 1992, she was appointed a Dame Commander of the Order of the British Empire in 2000.

Diplomatic posts
Preceded by Frank Basil Wheeler	British Ambassador to Chile; 1997–2000	Succeeded by Gregory Faulkner
Preceded by Sir John Holmes	British Ambassador to Portugal; 2001–2004	Succeeded by John Buck
