= Brazilians in the United Kingdom =

Ethnic group

Brazilians in the United Kingdom Brasileiros no Reino Unido
Total population
- Brazilian-born residents 52,148 (2011 Census); 87,000 (2018 ONS estimate); Brazilian nationals 220,000 (2020 Brazilian consulate estimate)

Regions with significant populations
- London (in particular Bayswater, Brent, Harlesden, Kensal Green and Willesden Green) • Brighton • Bournemouth • King's Lynn • Edinburgh • Great Yarmouth • Manchester • Liverpool

Languages
- Brazilian Portuguese and British English, Porglish

Religion
- Predominantly: Roman Catholicism Minority: Protestantism, Orthodox, Methodist, Presbyterian, Anglican, Judaism, Islam, Candomblé, Quimbanda, Umbanda, Irreligion

Related ethnic groups
- Brazilian diaspora • Latin American Britons • Portuguese Britons • Mediterranean • Greek Britons • Italian Britons • Brazilians in Ireland • Brazilian Australian • Brazilian American • Brazilian Canadians • Brazilians in France • Brazilians in Germany

Brazilians in the United Kingdom or Brazilian Britons (Portuguese: Brasileiros no Reino Unido) including Brazilian-born immigrants to the UK and their British-born descendants form the single largest Latin American group in the country.

== History ==
=== Early settlement ===
Brazilians came to the UK from the 1980s onwards to study, but once they arrived some discovered that the major cities' (in particular London's) ethnic and cultural diversity offered more professional opportunities. In part, this immigration of Brazilians to the UK is a consequence of the economic possibility of travel.

=== Contemporary history ===
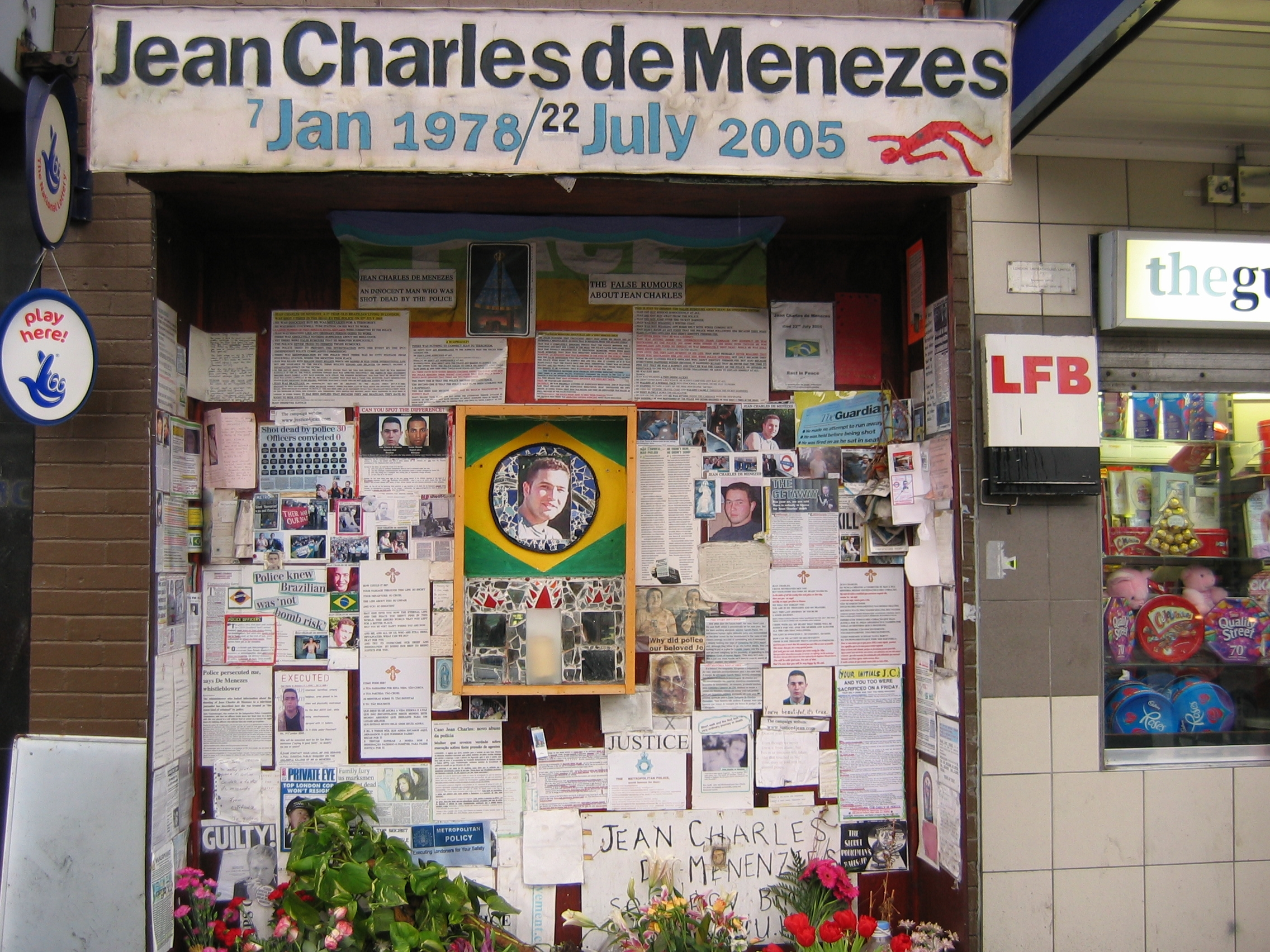
Shrine to Jean Charles de Menezes outside Stockwell Underground Station

The Brazilian community of the UK was brought into the global spotlight in 2005 as a result of the death of Jean Charles de Menezes. Menezes was a Brazilian national living and working in Tulse Hill, south London who on the morning of 22 July 2005 was misidentified as Hamdi Adus Isaac—one of the fugitives involved in the previous day's failed bombing attempts. This misidentification ultimately led to a number of non-uniformed Metropolitan Police officers following Menezes into Stockwell tube station and onto a train, where he was shot in the head seven times. The "shoot to kill" policy had been put in place after the 7 July 2005 London bombings. The inquest that resulted was followed worldwide including by Menezes's family in Gonzaga, Minas Gerais, who set up the "Justice4Jean" campaign.

== Demographics ==
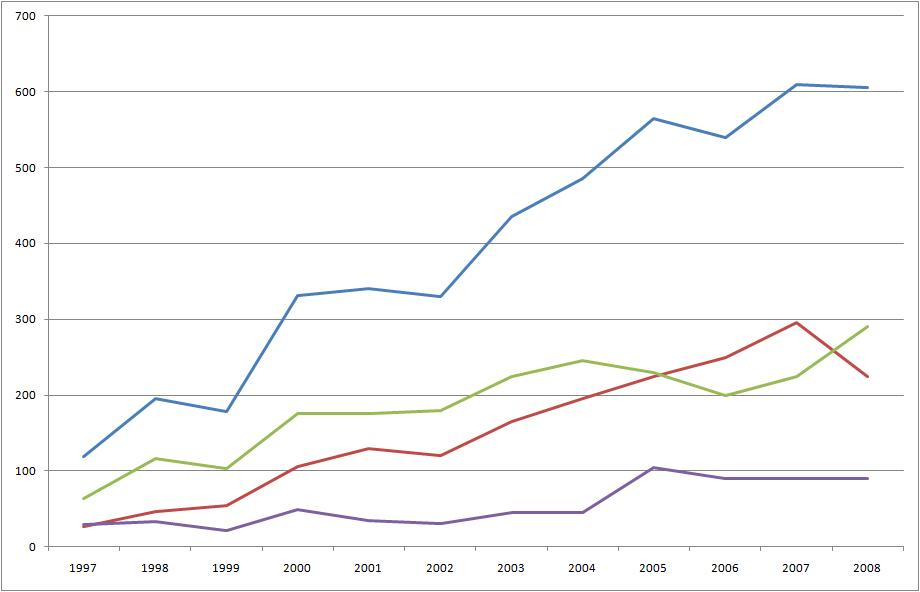
Brazilian nationals gaining British citizenship between 1997 and 2008. Red indicates through residence, green through marriage and purple grants of citizenship to children, blue is the total of all three.

=== Population ===
The 1991 Census recorded 9,301 Brazilian born people in the UK, and the 2001 Census recorded 15,215. In 2004, the Brazilian Consulate in London had 13,000 Brazilians registered as living in the UK. Office for National Statistics estimates suggest that there were 60,000 Brazilian-born people resident in the UK in 2009. The 2011 Census recorded 50,117 Brazilian-born residents in England, 453 in Wales, 1,194 in Scotland and 384 in Northern Ireland. The ONS estimates that in 2018, 87,000 people born in Brazil were living in the UK.

Several older guesstimates of the Brazilian population in the UK in the mid-2000s put the number at around 200,000. The discrepancy between official and unofficial population estimates has also been observed in studies of Brazilians in the United States. It has been suggested that the discrepancy is due to Brazilians overstaying their visas, or only seeing their stays as temporary, and therefore not participating in surveys or censuses. The Brazilian consulate in London estimated that in 2020, there were 220,000 Brazilians in the UK.

=== Spread and distribution ===
The majority of Brazilians in the UK reside in and around London. The 2001 Census showed that 8,000 people born in Brazil were residing in the capital, however in the same year other estimates suggested that were that between 15,000 and 50,000 Brazilians in London. In 2005, the BBC stated that the number of Londoners of Brazilian origin was approximately 60,000. Community groups estimated in 2007 that between 130,000 and 160,000 Brazilians were likely to be living in the London area. Within London, some 30,000 Brazilians were thought to reside in the Borough of Brent. Stockwell, south London is also home to a sizeable Brazilian community that lives alongside the UK's single largest Portuguese community in 'Little Portugal'. Bayswater in the City of Westminster has long been referred to as 'Brazilwater', indicating their heavy presence in the area.

Besides the Brazilian community in London, there are numerous other locations in England with Brazilian populations. It is estimated that some 20,000 Brazilians reside in the Midlands (the majority in Birmingham), while some 15,000 Brazilians are thought to live in the county of Norfolk in East Anglia (most of these in King's Lynn and Norwich). The coastal town of Brighton was home to an estimated 10,000 Brazilians in 2005. 10,000 individuals of Brazilian origin also live in the Greater Manchester/Liverpool Urban Area.

=== Religion ===
Brazil is the world's largest Catholic nation, 50% adhere to the faith while 29% of Brazilians follow Protestantism. The largest Brazilian church in the UK is the Universal Church of the Kingdom of God, which has temples in London and Birmingham. This church has been embroiled in scandals and accusations for some years. In 2000 a Brazilian Christian evangelical sect bought London radio station Liberty Radio (previously owned by Mohamed Al-Fayed). This purchase was surrounded by controversy largely due to the stations large established audience that could be influenced by the alleged corrupt church, which tells its followers that "diseases are caused by demons and prayer can rid them of debt". There are some 30 Brazilian evangelical churches in London. Further, many other denominations has a strong representation of Brazilians' communities in the UK including some special meetings in Portuguese language in the IPDA Igreja Pentecostal Deus e Amor-Pentecostal Church God is Love, The Church of Jesus Christ of Latter-day Saints, Jehova's Witnesses, Kardecists and others. There is a Brazilian Chaplaincy in East London, set up by the Catholic Church and run by Brazilian priests, who conduct mass in Portuguese to hundreds of Brazilians at weekends.

== Culture and community ==
=== Business and economics ===
According to analysis by the Institute for Public Policy Research based on Labour Force Survey data for 2000 to 2004, 57.4 per cent of Brazilian-born immigrants arriving in the UK in 1990 or after were employed (as opposed to studying, unemployed or inactive), with 80.7 per cent arriving before 1990 employed. Despite being relatively well educated, the majority of Brazilian immigrants to the UK have taken up professions that differ greatly from their previous careers in Brazil. The majority of Brazilian-born migrants to the UK choose jobs that are for the most part unskilled and low-paid; the reasons behind this include restrictions imposed by their immigration status and lack or limited knowledge of the English language. This has also been witnessed in the Brazilian diaspora in United States. A study conducted by Queen Mary, University of London revealed the most common jobs taken up by Brazilian immigrants in London. 32 per cent of individuals surveyed were involved in the cleaning industry, 26 per cent in hotel work and catering, 13 per cent in other 'services'. 10 per cent worked as couriers, 9 per cent in the construction industry, 3 per cent as au pairs or baby sitters. 6 per cent of those surveyed choose not to answer, while 1 per cent told of unemployment. Work and employment is an extremely important aspect for Brazilians in the UK, especially first-generation immigrants – many of whom came to the UK for the sole reason of seeking employment. In the same study, 25 per cent of respondents said they came to the UK to work and/or study, while 24.3 per cent claimed to have come for work and to save money either to be able to permanently settle in the UK or to send to family back in Brazil. A large number of Brazilian-owned businesses have sprung up in the UK over recent decades. They include personal care, counselling, solicitors and lawyers that provide services in Portuguese, baby sitting, private cleaning, removals and transportation, travel agencies, private functions, money transfer, accommodation, as well as shops selling Brazilian clothing, food and drink, alongside numerous cafes and restaurants.

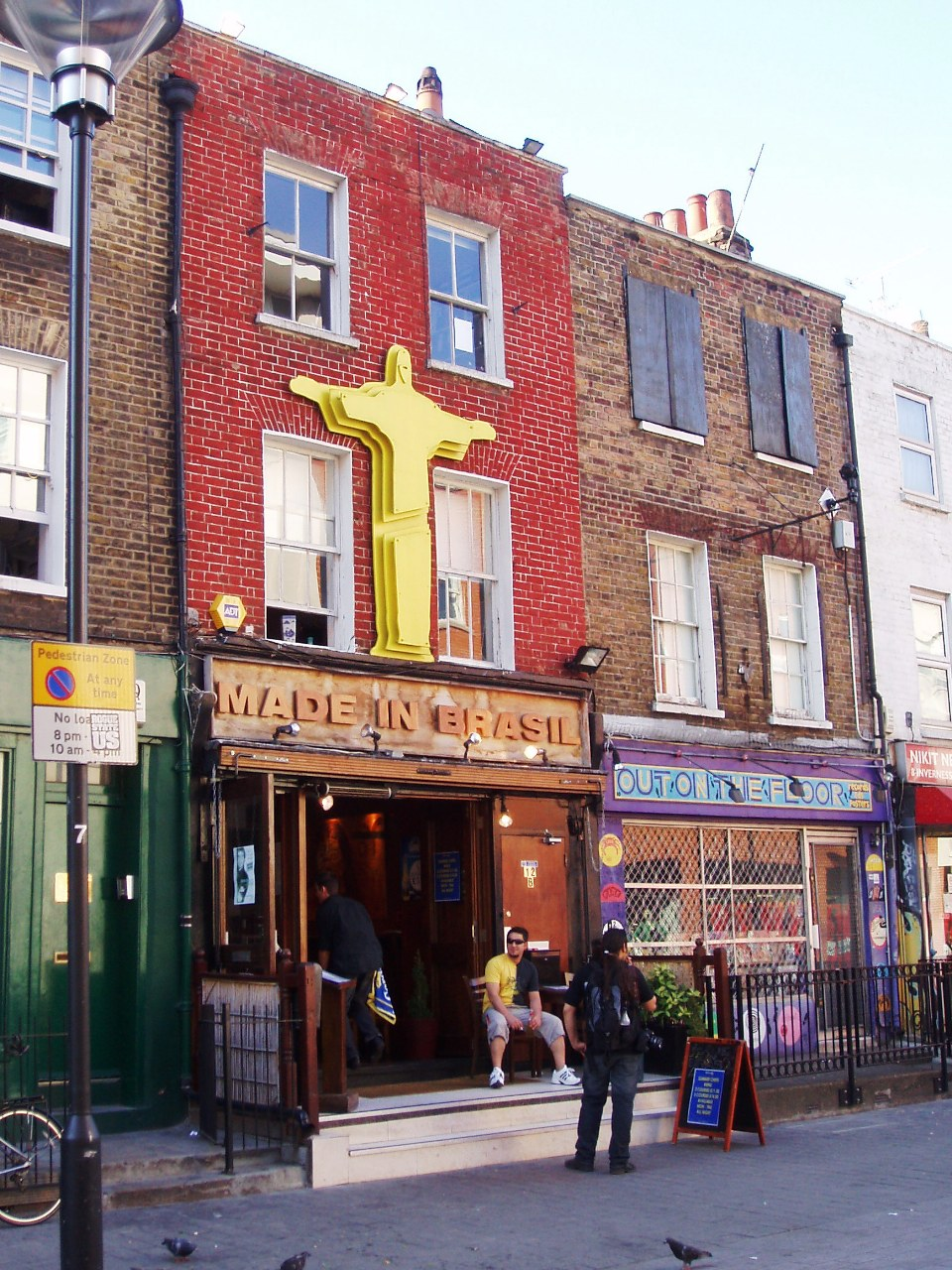
'Made in Brasil', a Brazilian bar in Camden Town

=== Media ===
==== Television ====
===== Rede Record =====
The Brazilian television channel Rede Record was previously on Sky channel 801, and Record Radio was on 0206 at the same time.

===== Creature Comforts =====
The 1989 animated short films produced by the Aardman Animations gives a humorous take on the voices of the British public spoken by animals. One of these short films feature a Brazilian puma speaking with a Brazilian accent about the advantages of living in the UK as compared to living in Brazil.

===== Canal Londres =====
Canal Londres.tv is an internet TV channel with news reports, interviews and advertisement directed mainly towards the Brazilians living in London.

==== Community newspapers and magazines ====
There are also many newspapers throughout the UK that cater specifically for the Brazilian British community. br@sil.net is a physical and online magazine that is concerned with topics from Brazil as well as covering information about the Brazilian British community. Notícias em Português is another UK-based fortnightly newspaper covering Brazilian and Portuguese-speaking community. Jungle Drums is a monthly magazine with content in Portuguese and English aimed primarily at the younger generations of the Brazilian British community. There are articles on Brazilian popular culture, society and politics, plus comparisons between life in the UK and Brazil. Leros and Revista Real are the names of two other monthly magazines read by the Brazilian British population, while Oi Londres is aimed specifically at Brazilians in the capital who are seeking information on immigration, employment opportunities and general news pieces. BrasUkas, To Em Londres, and VerdeAmarelas are Brazilians portals for people looking for jobs and opportunities in London as well as providing information for people who wish to move to or study in London. They also offer free classifieds sections that allow the Portuguese-speaking community to post advertisements for their businesses, job opportunities and property for sale.

An investigation conducted by the International Organization for Migration in 2005 found that in terms of newspaper readership, 67% of Brazilian British respondents stated that they prefer to read UK newspapers. Magazine readership differed completely, where 51% of respondents said they favoured Brazilian publications in the UK over general UK publications and even Brazilian publications from Brazil.

==== Brazilian associations ====
===== ABEP-UK—Association of Brazilian Postgraduate Students and Researchers in the United Kingdom =====
The Brazilian Association of Postgraduate Students and Researchers in the United Kingdom is a civil, nonprofit association based in London that brings together its members (Brazilian postgraduate students and researchers residing in the United Kingdom). ABEP-UK promotes the integration of its members and organises conferences and meetings within the academic community.

===== Anglo-Brazilian Society =====
The Anglo-Brazilian Society is a UK registered charity with a focus on promoting the Brazilian culture by means of exhibitions and cultural demonstrations, as well as supporting charitable activities related to Brazil.

=== Music and dance ===
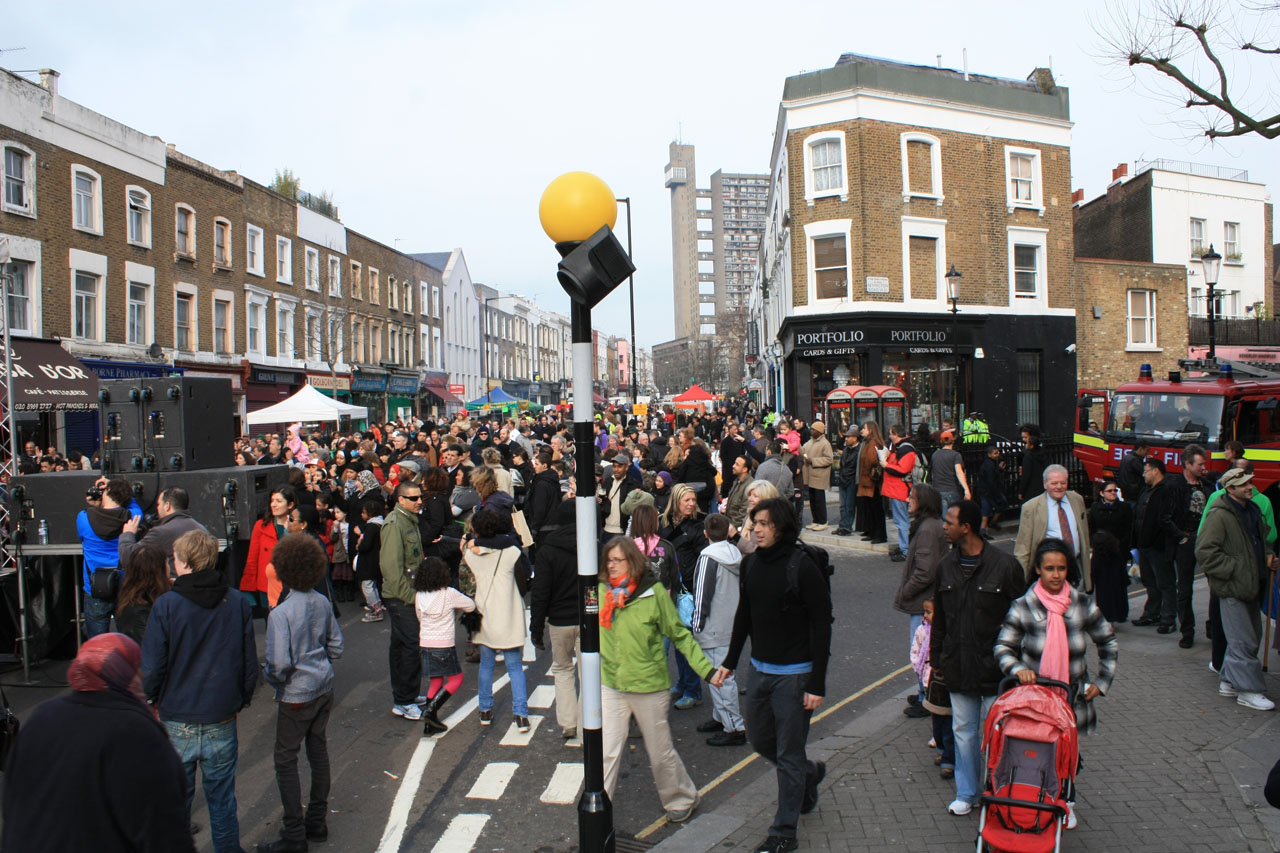
A Brazilian festival in March 2009, Golborne Road, Notting Hill

The vibrant emerging Brazilian community in the capital has in a short time been influential in shaping the face of London and its residents. The culture and music of Brazil has had a significant impact in the UK, most evidently as previously stated in London. Numerous bars, clubs and other late nite venues are across the city, including the Guanabara Bar in Holborn, London.

Many Brazilian acts perform in the Carnaval del Pueblo, Europe's largest celebration of Latin American culture, held in Burgess Park, London. There is also an annual festival celebrating Brazilian culture in the Golborne Road area that was most recently held in 2009. Brazilians have also participated in the Notting Hill Carnival and the Sadler's Wells Brazilian Carnival. A major three month event called 'Festival Brazil' is planned to take place between June and September 2010. Despite this, the single largest celebration of Brazilian culture in the UK is, in fact, held in Liverpool, Brazilica Festival has been held annually since 2008 when the city was European Capital of Culture and regularly attracts over 50,000 people.

Samba, the world-renowned Brazilian dancing style alongside the other Latin American dances, Salsa have spread in popularity across the world. Dance schools teaching the art form include 'Paraiso School of Samba', and the 'London School of Samba'. The 2001 film The Girl from Rio starring Hugh Laurie makes reference to a samba school in London, in which a banker, while fed up with his day job, gives samba lessons at night. Besides the presence of traditional Brazilian music in the UK, numerous British-born Brazilians have made a significant impact on the British music scene.

=== Sport ===
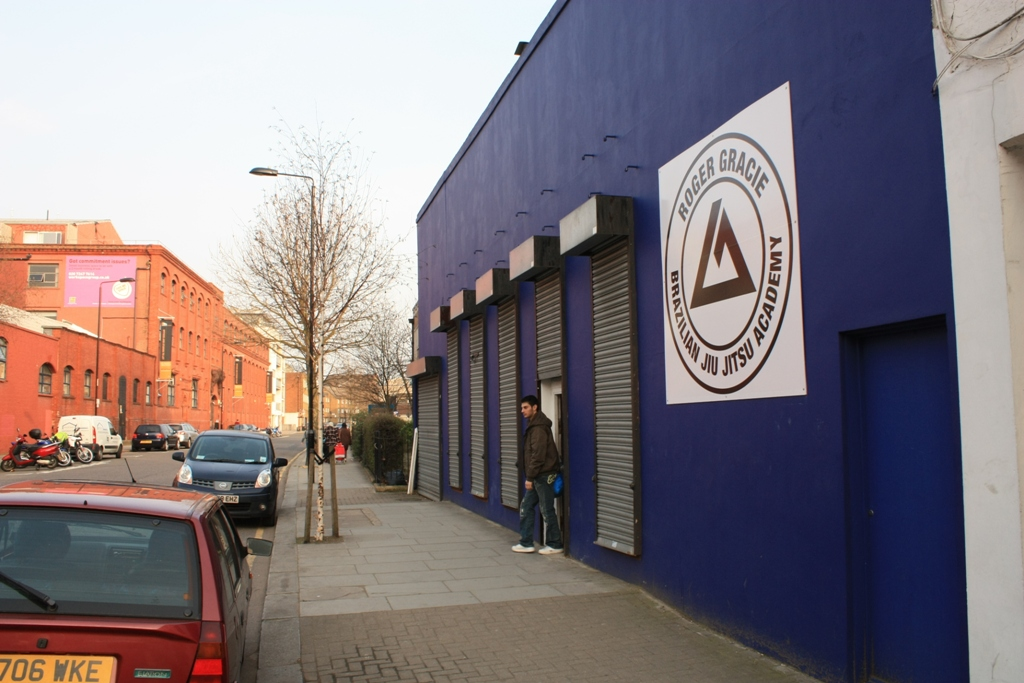
Brazilian Jiu-Jitsu Academy in Kensington, established by Roger Gracie

The Brazilian community in the UK has established many sporting groups including a number of Football, Futsal and Footvolley teams (the latter two of which are sports that originate in Brazil). This alongside schools for the Brazilian sports of Jiu-Jitsu and Capoeira. There are some Brazilian-organized teams that play in English leagues at amateur-level including the Brazilian Football Club of London. Helvecia, and Kickers are also among some of the teams established by the Brazilian British community who compete in the FA Futsal League. The Brazilian sport of Footvolley also now has a presence in the UK, and there is an England national team that has competed in places such as Brighton and Margate as well as abroad in France, Spain and Portugal.

Capoeira is an Afro-Brazilian art form that combines elements of dance, sport and martial art. It is 'played' in a circular space called roda and is becoming increasingly popular outside Brazil, there are now several capoeira schools and centres in the UK. Brazilian Sports Press is the name of a fortnightly newspaper covering Brazilian sporting news and events in the UK.

Among the most famous Brazilians in the UK are the numerous expatriate footballers that play in England's Premier League teams. Liverpool's first team includes three Brazilians, as of April 2018. The same number of Brazilians were on the first team of Manchester United in 2010. Two Brazilians were in Chelsea's squad at the same time, while one Brazilian played for Arsenal. Among the notable footballers who have played for Premier League teams are Juninho, Júlio Baptista, Gilberto Silva, Oscar, Robinho, among others. The former player and football manager Leonardo also worked as a pundit in the BBC's Match of the Day programmes during the 2006 World Cup.

== Notable people ==
The list below includes British citizens of Brazilian descent, whether UK born or not.

- Layla Anna-Lee - television presenter, born in London to an English father and a Brazilian mother
- Taio Cruz - singer, born in London to a Nigerian father and a Brazilian mother
- Michel de Carvalho - financier, former Olympic skier and luger, and former child actor born in Gerrards Cross, Buckinghamshire to an English mother and a Brazilian diplomat father
- Josefina de Vasconcellos - sculptor, born in Surrey to an English mother and a Brazilian father
- Alfred Enoch - actor, born in London to an English father and a Brazilian mother
- Liana Flores - musician from Norfolk, born to a Brazilian mother and an English father
- Roger Gracie - practitioner of Brazilian Jiu-Jitsu
- Mia Goth - actress, born in London to a Canadian father and a Brazilian mother
- Yara Rodrigues Fowler - novelist, born in London to a British father and a Brazilian mother
- Kaya Scodelario - actress, born in West Sussex to an English father and a Brazilian mother
- Seal - singer, born in London to a Brazilian father and a Nigerian mother
- Thalissa Teixeira - actress, born in West Yorkshire to an English mother and a Brazilian father

== See also ==
- Brazil–United Kingdom relations
- Brazilian diaspora
- English Brazilians
- British Brazilian
- Scottish Brazilians
- Portuguese in the United Kingdom
- Latin Americans in the United Kingdom
- Foreign-born population of the United Kingdom
