= Portuguese in the United Kingdom =

- Distribution of Portuguese citizens by local authority in England, Wales & Northern Ireland

Total population
- Portuguese-born residents in the United Kingdom: 164,759 – 0.2% (2021 Census) (Note: Includes those born in Madeira and the Azores. Does not include Portuguese born in the United Kingdom or those with Portuguese ancestry); England: 152,634 – 0.3% (2021); Scotland: 4,715; Wales: 3,664 – 0.1% (2021); Northern Ireland: 3,746 – 0.2% (2021); 92,065 (2011 Census); 165,000 (2019 ONS estimate); Portuguese citizens: 286,489 (England and Wales only, 2021)

Regions with significant populations
- London (Stockwell), East Anglia (Great Yarmouth and Peterborough Particularly), South East England, East Midlands (Leicester), Northern Ireland, Bournemouth, Birmingham

Languages
- English, Portuguese

Religion
- Roman Catholicism

Related ethnic groups
- Portuguese; Portuguese Brazilian; Brazilian British; Portuguese Canadian; Brazilian Canadian; Portuguese American; Brazilian American

Portuguese in the United Kingdom (Portuguese: português britânico) are citizens or residents of the United Kingdom who are of Portuguese ancestral origin.

== Background ==
=== History and settlement ===
The New Christians, who had converted from Judaism to Roman Catholicism to avoid persecution but many of whom continued to practise their previous faith, began to migrate in small numbers to Britain in the late 15th century. As a result, by 1550 there were approximately 100 Portuguese Jews in London. Because England's religious status was unsettled at the time, the community remained secretive. The community centred around the Anes family, who provided a physician, Rodrigo López, to Queen Elizabeth. The community was expelled in 1609, although some members were able to remain. In the 17th century, more Portuguese Jews fled to England from the Spanish and Portuguese Inquisitions. Many of these came from the Canary Islands. With the readmission of Jews to England, from 1656 onwards the community was able to practise its beliefs. The Bevis Marks Synagogue, constructed in 1701, has traditionally been attended by members of London's Spanish and Portuguese Jewish community. Fried fish, which forms part of the classic British dish of fish and chips, was introduced to Britain by Jewish migrants fleeing Portugal and Spain.

Some Portuguese emigrated to the UK in the 1950s and 1960s, when guest workers left Portugal for other Western European countries in search of employment opportunities. However, the scale of migration to the UK during this period was small in comparison with Portuguese migration to France and Germany. Some Portuguese migrated to the UK in the 1960s and 1970s, when Portugal was amongst the poorest countries in Europe. Young males also left Portugal at this time in order to avoid being conscripted to fight in the Portuguese Colonial War. More significant migration flows did not start until the late 1990s, and coincided with a significant rise in the Portuguese unemployment rate in the early to mid-2000s. While different sources disagree on the total size of the Portuguese population of the UK, they agree that there was a significant increase in migration from Portugal from 2000 until the United Kingdom's withdrawal from the European Union (Brexit). However, annual migration dropped significantly after that.

From March 2019, Portuguese citizens resident in the United Kingdom who wished to remain in the UK after 30 June 2021 were able to apply for Indefinite leave to remain (ILR) in the UK through the EU Settlement Scheme negotiated after Brexit. After 30 June 2021, EU citizens of all Member States who had not obtained an ILR under the Scheme were no longer legally resident in the UK.

== Demographics ==
=== Population ===
The 2001 UK Census recorded 36,555 Portuguese-born people resident in the UK. More recent estimates by the Office for National Statistics put the figure at 165,000 in 2019. The 2011 Census recorded 88,161 Portuguese-born residents in England and Wales. The censuses of Scotland and Northern Ireland recorded 1,908 and 1,996 Portuguese-born residents respectively. Other sources estimate the Portuguese community to be larger, with the editor of a Portuguese-language newspaper putting the number of Portuguese passport holders in London alone at 350,000. According to academics José Carlos Pina Almeida and David Corkill, writing in 2010, estimates of the Portuguese population of the UK range from 80,000 to 700,000.

Almeida and Corkill report that the Portuguese-speaking groups in the UK are characterised by diversity of country of origin. Research published in 2007 found that approximately 30 per cent of Portuguese nationals registered with the consulate in London were born outside of Portugal, with six countries of birth featuring prominently: Angola, India (which took over the former Portuguese territories of Goa, Daman and Diu in 1961), Mozambique, Brazil, South Africa and Macau (those associated with Macau before China took over in 1999 or those with such a parent are eligible for Portuguese citizenship). Almeida and Corkill argue that many migrants from these countries lived in Portugal before migrating onwards to the UK, and note that Portugal's European Union accession in 1986 "permitted those colonial subjects who possessed a Portuguese passport to gain entry to other member states", including the UK.

As of 2021, an estimated 15,000 East Timorese people live in the UK, with many being holders of Portuguese passports.

=== Population distribution ===
Location	Portuguese-born population (2011)
East Midlands	4,393
East of England	12,161
London	41,041
North East England	646
North West England	3,858
South East England	12,430
South West England	5,592
West Midlands	3,379
Yorkshire and the Humber	2,345
Northern Ireland	1,996
Scotland	1,908
Wales	2,316

Of the 88,161 Portuguese-born residents of England and Wales recorded by the 2011 census, the vast majority were living in England. The English region with the largest concentration of Portuguese-born residents was London, accounting for almost half of the total England and Wales population. The South East had the second-largest concentration, closely followed by the East of England. Within London, the largest concentrations were in the boroughs of Lambeth (6,992 Portuguese-born residents) and Brent (3,076). Vauxhall in Lambeth is a "long-standing hub for the Portuguese community". Outside of London, Norfolk was the county with the largest concentration (3,418 Portuguese-born residents). Within Norfolk, 1,455 Portuguese-born people were living in Breckland, which includes the town of Thetford, which has been noted for its large Portuguese population.

=== Languages ===
According to the 2011 Census, Portuguese is the tenth most commonly spoken language in England and Wales, with 133,453 speakers. A study undertaken in 2000 found that Portuguese was the 14th most common mother tongue amongst school children in London. There is also a small community of speakers of the Portuguese-African creole Kriolu language from the Cape Verde Islands in Greenwich.

== Employment ==
Figures published by the Office for National Statistics show that in the three months to June 2008, 82.8 per cent of working-age Portuguese-born men were in employment. The figure for women was 68.8 per cent. The unemployment rate was 7.4 per cent for men and 9.8 per cent for women. 10.5 per cent of Portuguese-born men and 23.8 per cent of Portuguese-born women were economically inactive (this figure includes students, carers and the long-term sick, injured or disabled).

== Education ==
National data on the educational performance of Portuguese pupils is not available because official ethnicity statistics do not differentiate between different European groups, but some local authorities have started to collect data with which to monitor pupil performance in more detail. Data from Lambeth schools "indicate Portuguese pupils were the lowest attaining groups compared to the national average of White British, African, Caribbean, Indian and other ethnic minority groups". Data collected by the Institute for Public Policy Research from local authorities in England that collect data using extended ethnicity codes shows that, in 2010–2011, the proportion of Portuguese pupils gaining 5 A*–C grades including maths and English at GCSE was 45.9 percentage points below the England mean of 56.9 per cent. Studies have attributed this relative underachievement to factors including "lack of understanding of the British education system, difficulties in speaking English, poor school attendance, poverty, interrupted prior education, negative teacher perceptions, poor school to home liaison and lack of exposure to written language". The research evidence from Lambeth shows that Portuguese pupils with poor English fluency perform poorly in educational terms, but that those who are fluent in English actually perform better than national averages.

There are plans to open a bilingual school, approved by the Department for Education and will be called the Anglo-Portuguese School of London.

== Culture and community ==
With the great number of Madeirans in the UK, Madeira Day and Portugal Day are celebrated in London.

=== Media ===
Media for the Portuguese community in the UK as well as the Portuguese-speaking community has a strong presences, these include several newspaper publications, radio stations and television channels.

Newspapers

- as notícias – launched in 2006; aimed primarily at Portuguese nationals living and working in the UK; with a circulation of around 50,000 and being available in 60 locations nationwide, it is likely to be the UK's main Portuguese newspaper

Television

- ZON TV Satélite – a package of 130 channels (36 of which are in Portuguese); available throughout the UK at a similar cost to the UK based cable networks
- meo satélite – a similar package as ZON TV Satélite, but focused more on sports, children's programming and Portuguese programming
- RTP Internacional – international feed of the Portuguese public broadcaster, RTP
- Rede Record – although a Portuguese-language channel, it was aimed primarily at the Brazilian community in the UK; in the past, it was available on Sky channel 801

== Famous Portuguese Britons ==
=== British citizens ===
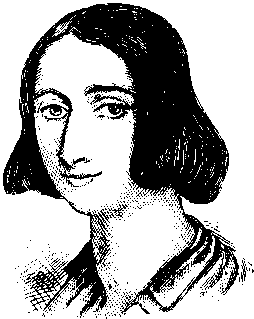
Grace Aguilar, a historically significant novelist

The list below includes British born people of Portuguese descent and Portuguese born people who have become British citizens.

- Joan of Acre – daughter of King Edward I of England and Queen Eleanor of Castile
- Grace Aguilar – novelist and writer
- Nadia Almada – Big Brother winner
- Lucy Bronze - England international footballer
- James Calado – racecar driver
- Frederick Cardozo – WWII soldier and SOE veteran
- Catherine of Braganza – Queen consort of England, of Scotland and of Ireland (1662–1685), as King Charles II's wife
- Moses da Costa – 18th-century banker
- Felicity Dahl (née D'Abreu, born 1938) – film producer
- Antonio Fernandez Carvajal – merchant and first naturalized Jew in England
- Sir Basil Henriques – author and philanthropist, fought in World War I; became a magistrate and was knighted
- Rodrigo Lópes – physician to Queen Elizabeth I
- John Mousinho – footballer whose father family immigrated from Lisbon.
- Manuel II of Portugal – the country's last king, who lived in Britain in exile
- George Pereira – explorer, soldier, writer, and diplomatist
- Constance of York, Countess of Gloucester – countess
- David Ricardo – British political economist whose Portuguese-Jewish family migrated to London from Amsterdam
- Pedro Gil Ferreira – astrophysicist and author

=== Non-citizen immigrants ===
The list below includes Portuguese immigrants and expatriates in the United Kingdom, who are not official British citizens, but residents of the UK.

- Paula Rego – painter and first artist-in-residence at the National Gallery in London
- José Fonte – footballer who previously played for Southampton and West Ham United
- Artur Pizarro – pianist
- João Mendonça Azevedo – footballer
- Miguel Alexandre Cabral Machado – swimmer
- Carlos Alberto Portugal Correia de Lacerda – poet and BBC presenter
- Filipa Daniela Azevedo de Magalhães – singer
- João de Pina-Cabral – anthropologist
- Sime Seruya – actress, suffragist and socialist
- Francisco Veloso – academic

== See also ==
- Portugal–United Kingdom relations
- Little Portugal, London
- Brazilians in the United Kingdom
- Portuguese diaspora
- Portuguese people
- Portuguese Australian
- Portuguese American
- Portuguese Canadians
- Portuguese New Zealanders
- British migration to Portugal
