= 1867 AAC Championships =

Outdoor track and field competition

- Dates: 15 April 1867
- Host city: London, England
- Venue: Beaufort House, Walham Green, London
- Level: Senior
- Type: Outdoor

The 1867 AAC Championships was an outdoor track and field competition organised by the Amateur Athletic Club (AAC). The championships were held on 15 April 1867, in the grounds of Thomas Jones, 7th Viscount Ranelagh's Beaufort House.

== Summary ==
- Heavy rain showers at frequent intervals.
- A cup was presented to each winner and a medal was awarded to second place.
- Thomas Farnworth set a 7 miles walk national record of 58:12.

== Results ==
Event	1st			2nd			3rd		
100 yards	John H. Ridley	Eton	10¾	William Collett	London AC	1 yd	Robert W. Vidal	St John's, Ox	1 ft
quarter-mile	John H. Ridley	Eton	52¾	Robert W. Vidal	St John's, Ox	¾ yd	Edward Colbeck	London AC	1 ft
half-mile	William Frere	Magdalen	2:10.0	William D. Hogarth	Liverpool	3 yd	Arthur King	Thames RC	walked in
1 mile	Samuel G. Scott	Magdalen	4:42.0	Charles Long	Trinity College	6 inches	Walter M. Chinnery	London AC	walked in
4 miles	Gilbert G. Kennedy	Trinity College	22:12.5	John W. Fletcher	Pembroke	15 yd	James G. Webster	London AC	150 yd
120yd hurdles	Arthur Law	Jesus, Cm	18.0	Henry M. Thompson	Trinity College	6 inches	Clement Jackson	Magdalen Hall	2 ft
7 miles walk	Thomas H. Farnworth	Liverpool	58:12 NR	John Chambers	AAC	6 in	T. W. Thompson	London AC	a good lap
high jump	Charles E. Greene; Thomas G. Little	Trinity College; Peterhouse	1.727; 1.727	n/a			Frederick W. Parsons; Sir Victor Brooke	Magdalen; AAC	1.676; 1.676
high pole jump	William F. Powell Moore	London AC	2.82	Edmund Gurney	Trinity College	2.74	only 2 competitors		
broad jump	Richard Fitzherbert	St John's, Cm	5.91	Thomas G. Little	Peterhouse	5.84	only 2 competitors		
shot put	John Stone	Liverpool Gymnasium	11.13	Richard Waltham	Peterhouse	10.10	William F. Powell Moore	London AC	10.08
hammer throw	Patrick Halkett	London AC	28.83	John R. Eyre	Clare	28.68	George R. Thornton	Jesus, Cm	28.40
