= Archibald Kennedy, 11th Earl of Cassilis =

Scottish noble

Captain The Right Honourable The Earl of Cassilis
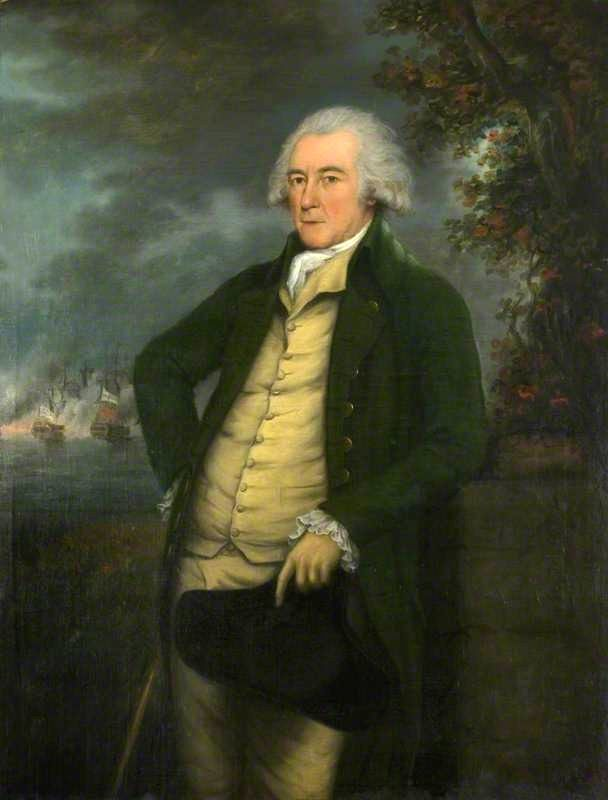
- Portrait by Mather Brown
- Born: Archibald Kennedy; 1720
- Died: 30 December 1794 (aged 73–74)
- Spouses: Katherine Schuyler (died 1765) Anne Watts (m. 1769; died 1793)
- Children: Archibald Kennedy, 1st Marquess of Ailsa
- Parent(s): Archibald Kennedy; Maria Walter Kennedy
- Relatives: Robert Walter (grandfather)

Captain Archibald Kennedy, 11th Earl of Cassilis (1720 – 30 December 1794) was a Scottish peer who lived in the English colony of New York which became part of the United States.

== Early life ==
Kennedy, who lived in New York City at 1 Broadway in the Kennedy mansion, was the son of Archibald Kennedy (1685–1763) and Maria (née Walter) Schuyler Kennedy (1689–1764). He was born in 1720. His mother, a daughter of mayor Robert Walter and Catharine Leisler (a daughter of New York colonial governor Jacob Leisler, known for his role in Leisler's Rebellion), was briefly married, and widowed, to Arent Schuyler before her marriage to his father. His father, a direct descendant of the second son of Gilbert Kennedy, 3rd Earl of Cassilis, died in 1763.

== Career ==
Having joined the Royal Navy, Kennedy passed his exam for the rank of lieutenant on 11 December 1744 and was promoted five days later. He was appointed to serve on the 14-gun sloop HMS Otter, which he did until 29 February of either 1747 or 1748. Still a lieutenant, he was next appointed to serve on the 20-gun frigate HMS Centaur on 6 April 1751. He left Centaur on 16 August 1754 and was promoted to commander on 13 March 1756. At the same time as his promotion, he was given command of the 18-gun sloop HMS Halifax, but his ship was captured by the French on 14 August of the same year. Kennedy did not receive another command as a commander, but was promoted to post-captain on 4 April 1757 and given command of the brand new 32-gun frigate HMS Vestal. He commanded Vestal until 10 June of the same year.

His next command came on 3 March 1758 when he was given the 20-gun post ship HMS Flamborough. In Flamborough he fought at the Raid on St Malo between 5 and 12 June 1758, and was then transferred to command the 32-gun frigate HMS Quebec on 30 June 1760. He stayed in command of Quebec for only two months, leaving her on 23 August to join instead the 32-gun frigate HMS Blonde. He commanded Blonde until 20 February 1763, and on 9 April was given command of the 28-gun frigate HMS Coventry. Kennedy left Coventry on 14 December 1765 but returned to command her again on 1 July 1766. In November, still commanding Coventry, he was appointed Commander-in-Chief, North American Station, as the senior captain present. He served in this role until July of the following year, and relinquished command of Coventry on 15 February 1768.

He owned what is now Liberty Island in the Upper New York Bay off Manhattan from 1746 to 1758, using it as a summer residence.

In 1757, at the end of the Seven Years' War, Kennedy was promoted to Post-Captain and given command of all Royal Navy ships stationed at New York, part of a greater effort to generate more American revenues by keeping smuggling in check.

On 18 December 1792, upon the death of a distant cousin, the 10th Earl (who died without male issue), Archibald was recalled from New York to Culzean Castle in Scotland to succeed to the Earldom and titles as the 11th Earl of Cassilis, and 13th Lord Kennedy.

== Personal life ==
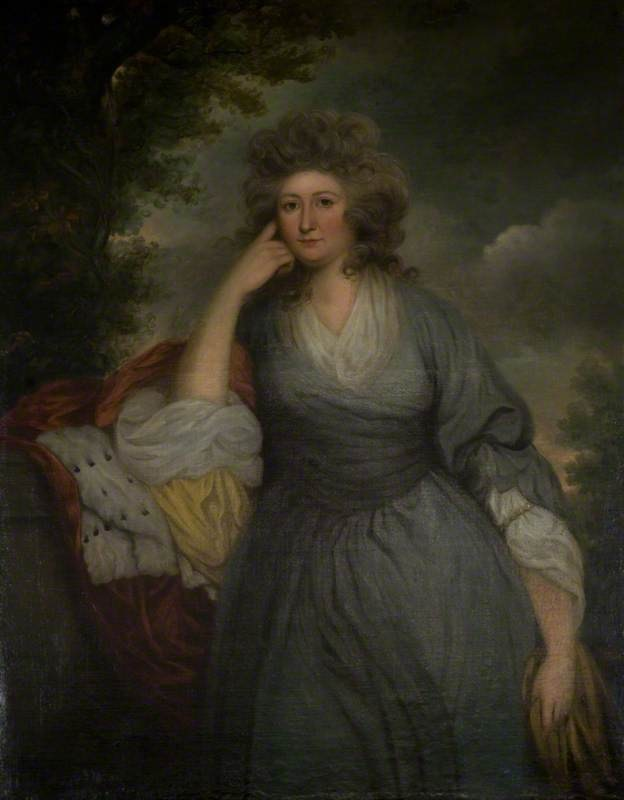
Portrait of his second wife, Anne Watts, by Mather Brown.

His first marriage took place sometime before June 1765, to Katherine Schuyler (1737–1765), daughter of Peter Schuyler and granddaughter of Arent Schuyler, his mother's first husband. Katherine was an only child, so she inherited all of her father's estate upon his death in 1762. After her death in 1765, Kennedy inherited the entire estate.

On 27 April 1769, he married for the second time to Anne Watts (1744–1793), the daughter of John Watts and Ann DeLancey, sister of John Watts (1749–1836), and granddaughter of Stephen Delancey. Like his first wife, Watts was also a descendant of the Schuyler family. They had three children:

- Archibald Kennedy, 1st Marquess of Ailsa (1770–1846), who married Margaret Erskine of Dun.
- Hon. John Kennedy (1771–1859), who married in 1800 Charlotte Gill, daughter of Lawrence Gill, Esq.
- Hon. Robert Kennedy (1773–1843), who married Jane Macomb, daughter of merchant Alexander Macomb, on 22 March 1794. Their children included Anne Disbrowe.
- Lady Anne (d. 31 December 1820), who married 21 July 1795 William Henry Digby, Esq. (d. 1820)

His wife died on 29 December 1793 and he died almost exactly one year later on 30 December 1794.

=== Descendants ===
Through his son Robert, he was a grandfather of Sophia Eliza Kennedy, who married John Levett of Wychnor Park and Packington Hall, Staffordshire. Their son, Capt. Robert Thomas Kennedy Levett, DL, was named for his grandfather Kennedy.

His great-grandsons included Sir John Gordon Kennedy K.C.M.G. (1836–1912), who became an eminent diplomat, Admiral Sir William Robert Kennedy G.C.B. (1838–1916), who became Commander-in-Chief, The Nore, and Gilbert George Kennedy (1844–1909) who played for the Scottish XI in the second international football match against England. His great-grandson Edward Briggs Kennedy was father of Royal Navy Captain Edward Kennedy, whose son was the journalist and broadcaster Ludovic Kennedy.

== Sources ==
- Harrison, Cy (2019). Royal Navy Officers of the Seven Years War. Warwick, England: Helion. ISBN 978-1-912866-68-7.
- Stout, Neil R. (January 1964). "Captain Kennedy and the Stamp Act". New York History. 45 (1). Fenimore Art Museum: 44–58. JSTOR 23162484.

Peerage of Scotland
| Preceded by David Kennedy | Earl of Cassilis; 1792–1794 | Succeeded by Archibald Kennedy |
