= Audley Gosling =

British diplomat (1836–1913)

Sir Audley Charles Gosling KCMG (20 November 1836 – 7 December 1913) was a British diplomat who served as British Minister to Chile 1897–1901.

== Early life and background ==
Gosling was born in 1836, the younger son of Captain Gosling, Royal Navy. He served with the Royal Welsh Fusiliers 1855–57.

== Diplomatic career ==
Gosling entered the diplomatic service in 1859, and served as Secretary of Legation in Copenhagen from 1881, and in Madrid from 1885. After a spell as Secretary of Embassy in St Petersburg 1888-90, he was posted to Latin America for the rest of his diplomatic career. He was appointed British Minister Resident to the Central American Republics in 1890, and was resident in Guatemala, also covering Honduras and El Salvador. In 1897, he was appointed Minister Resident and Consul-General to the Republic of Chile, and the position was upgraded to Envoy Extraordinary and Minister Plenipotentiary in 1899. He resigned in late 1901, was appointed a Knight Commander of the Order of St Michael and St George (KCMG) in the 1901 Birthday Honours list, and invested as such by King Edward VII at Marlborough House on 28 December 1901.

== Family ==
Gosling married first, in 1858, Ida Gyldenstolpe, daughter of Count August Gyldenstolpe, Chamberlain to the King of Sweden. She died in 1900, leaving five children, three sons and two daughters. He married secondly, in 1904, Augusta, Countess Posse (née de Hägerflycht), widow of Count Arvid Posse, a former Prime Minister of Sweden.

Audley Charles Gosling died at Southsea on 7 December 1913.

Diplomatic posts
Preceded by James Hariss-Gastrell	British Minister Resident to the Central American Republics; 1890–1897	Succeeded by George Jenner
Preceded by John Gordon Kennedy	British Minister to Chile; 1897–1901	Succeeded by Gerard Lowther
