= Nigel Ronald =

British diplomat (1894–1973)

Sir Nigel Ronald KCMG CVO

British Ambassador to Portugal
- In office 1947–1954
- Preceded by: Sir Owen St.Clair O'Malley
- Succeeded by: Sir Charles Stirling

Personal details
- Born: 20 December 1894
- Died: 15 May 1973 (aged 78)
- Education: Magdalen College, Oxford
- Occupation: Diplomat

Sir Nigel Bruce Ronald (20 December 1894 – 15 May 1973) was a British civil servant and diplomat who served as ambassador to Portugal from 1947 to 1954.

== Early life and education ==
Ronald was born on 20 December 1894, the son of Arthur Wilson Ronald. He was educated at Winchester College and Magdalen College, Oxford.

== Career ==
After serving during World War I with the King's Regiment (Liverpool) from 1914 to 1917 and, after being severely wounded, the Grenadier Guards (special reserve) from 1917 to 1920, Ronald joined the Diplomatic Service in 1920 as third secretary and went to Bern. He was promoted to second secretary in 1922.

Ronald worked at the Foreign Office in 1923. He was appointed Private Secretary to the Parliamentary Under-Secretary in 1927, and from 1929 to 1934 served as Assistant Private Secretary to the Foreign Secretary. Having been promoted to first secretary in 1930, he was promoted in 1939 to counsellor. After serving as Assistant Under-Secretary for Foreign Affairs (economic) from 1942 to 1947, he was appointed ambassador to Portugal, a post he held until 1954.

Ronald retired from the Diplomatic Service in 1954 and settled in Dorset. He never married.

== Honours ==
Ronald was appointed Companion of the Order of St Michael and St George (CMG) in the 1934 New Year Honours and promoted to Knight Commander (KCMG) in the 1946 New Year Honours. He was appointed Commander of the Royal Victorian Order (CVO) in the 1935 New Year Honours.

== See also ==
- Portugal–United Kingdom relations

Diplomatic posts
Preceded by Sir Owen St.Clair O'Malley	British Ambassador to Portugal; 1947–1954	Succeeded by Sir Charles Stirling
