= List of ambassadors of the United Kingdom to Chile =

The ambassador of the United Kingdom to Chile is the United Kingdom's foremost diplomatic representative in the Republic of Chile, and head of the UK's diplomatic mission in Chile. The official title is His Britannic Majesty's Ambassador to Chile.

== List of heads of mission ==
=== Consuls-general and plenipotentiary ===
- 1823–1837: Christopher Richard Nugent, Consul General
- 1837–1841: Colonel John Walpole

=== Chargé d'affaires and consuls-general ===
- 1841–1849: Colonel John Walpole
- 1849–1852: Stephen Henry Sulivan
- 1853–1858: Edward Harris
- 1858–1872: William Taylour Thomson

=== Ministers resident and consuls-general to the Republic of Chile ===
- 1872–1878: Sir Horace Rumbold
- 1878–1885: Francis Pakenham
- 1885–1888: Hugh Fraser
- 1888–1897: John Kennedy
- 1897–1901: Audley Gosling

=== Envoys extraordinary and ministers plenipotentiary to the Republic of Chile ===
- 1901–1905: Gerard Lowther
- 1905–1907: Arthur Raikes
- 1907: Sir Brooke Boothby, Bt (appointed but did not take up post due to poor health)
- 1907–1909: Henry Bax-Ironside
- 1909–1913: Henry Lowther
- 1913–1918: Sir Francis Stronge
- 1918–1922: Tudor Vaughan
- 1923–1924: Sir Arthur Grant Duff
- 1924–1927: Sir Thomas Hohler
- 1928–1930: Archibald Clark Kerr

=== Ambassadors extraordinary and plenipotentiary to the Republic of Chile ===
- 1930–1933: Sir Henry Chilton
- 1933–1936: Sir Robert Michell
- 1936: Sir Joseph Addison (appointed but did not proceed due to ill health)
- 1937–1940: Sir Charles Bentinck
- 1940–1945: Sir Charles Orde
- 1945–1949: Sir John Leche
- 1949–1951: Sir Bertrand Jerram
- 1951–1954: Sir Charles Stirling
- 1955–1958: Sir Charles Empson
- 1958–1961: Ivor Pink
- 1961–1966: Sir David Scott Fox
- 1966–1970: Sir Frederick Mason
- 1970–1973: Sir David Hildyard
- 1973–1976: Reginald Secondé
- 1976–1980: (Ambassador withdrawn after torture of Sheila Cassidy)
- 1980–1982: John Heath
- 1982–1987: John Hickman
- 1987–1990: Alan White
- 1990–1993: Richard Neilson
- 1993–1997: Frank Wheeler
- 1997–2000: Glynne Evans
- 2000–2003: Gregory Faulkner
- 2003–2005: Richard Wilkinson
- 2005–2009: Howard Drake
- 2009–2014: Jon Benjamin
- 2014–2018: Fiona Clouder
- 2018–2021 Jamie Bowden
- 2021–2026: Louise de Sousa
- 2026 – Present: David Concar
