= Gilbert G. Kennedy =

Scottish footballer and cricketer

Gilbert Kennedy
Personal information
- Born: 9 May 1844 Bath, England
- Died: 2 January 1909 (aged 64) Thanet, Kent

Gilbert George Kennedy (9 May 1844 – 2 January 1909) was a Scottish amateur sportsman who played for the Scottish XI in the second international football match against England. He was also a regular member of the Wanderers club and an occasional cricketer. By profession, he was a police magistrate and Justice of the Peace.

== Family and education ==
Kennedy was born in Bath, the son of John Kennedy and Amelia Maria Briggs. His father, who died in March 1845, had been the British Chargé d'affaires in Naples, Italy and the Secretary of Legation to the US. His great-grandfather was Archibald Kennedy, 11th Earl of Cassilis.

His elder brothers were: Admiral Sir William Robert Kennedy GCB (1838–1916), who became Commander-in-Chief, The Nore; Sir John Gordon Kennedy K.C.M.G. (1836–1912), who became an eminent diplomat; Edward Briggs Kennedy (1842-1914), who went to Queensland, Australia, and after a brief period in the Queensland Native Police established a sugar plantation there- his son, Captain Edward Kennedy, of the Royal Navy, was father of the broadcaster Ludovic Kennedy.

Kennedy was educated at Harrow School from 1858 to 1863. In his final year he was a member of the school football XI. He then went up to Trinity College, Cambridge from where he graduated with a Bachelor of Arts degree in 1868. In 1868, he won a blue in athletics in the three-mile race and one year later won the 4 miles walk event at the 1867 AAC Championships.

During his time at Cambridge, he also rowed at bow in the First Trinity VIII in the Head of the River Race in 1867 and ran the two and three miles races at the University Sports in 1867 and 1868.

In 1861, he was resident at Leamington Priors, Warwickshire; in 1871 he was resident at the George Hotel in Nottingham.

He married Alice Lyon on 6 August 1874. Their children included:

- Gilbert Lyon Kennedy (1875–1945)
- David Macomb Kennedy (1878–1899)
- Humphrey Hayes Kennedy (1882–1918), who was a lieutenant-colonel in the Seaforth Highlanders and killed in the First World War
- John de Navarre Kennedy O.B.E. (1888–1979) who became a judge in Canada

== Sporting career ==
During his time at Cambridge, Kennedy represented Trinity College at cricket with appearances against Huntingdonshire in May 1866 and June 1867.

He first played football for the Wanderers in December 1866, making his debut in a 1–0 defeat by Old Etonians. Over the next eight seasons, he was a regular member of the side, making a total of 41 appearances, scoring 8 goals. He played in the FA Cup match against Crystal Palace on 20 January 1872, which ended in a 0–0 draw, with both teams progressing to the semi-finals. He also represented Middlesex against Surrey and Kent and for London against Sheffield in 1867 and was a member of the Football Association committee from 1869 to 1870.

Described as "No mean forward and very great in front of the enemy's goal", he was selected to represent "Scotland" in the second pseudo-international match against the English side, organised by Charles Alcock. The Scottish XI was made up from players from London and the Home Counties with "Scottish connections". The English won the match, played at The Oval on 19 November 1870, with a single goal from R.S.F. Walker.

== Professional career ==
On leaving university, he became a barrister, being admitted as a pupil of the Inner Temple in January 1867 and called to the bar on 30 April 1870.

From 1883 to 1889, he was on the Midland Circuit and served as recorder at Grantham. From 1889 to 1907, he was a Metropolitan Police magistrate, serving at Marlborough Street Police Court and later at Greenwich and Woolwich. He was also a Justice of the Peace in London, Essex, Hertfordshire, Middlesex, Kent and Surrey.

His publications included A Guide to the Coal Mines Regulation Act, 1887 and The Law of Land Drainage and Sewers.

He lived at 6, Linden Gardens, Kensington, London; following his retirement, he settled at "St. David's", Broadstairs in Kent. Kennedy died in Thanet, Kent, on 2 January 1909.
