= Archibald Ross (diplomat) =

British diplomat (1911–1996)

Sir Archibald Ross KCMG

British Ambassador to Sweden
- In office 1966–1971
- Preceded by: Sir Moore Crosthwaite
- Succeeded by: Sir Guy Millard

British Ambassador to Portugal
- In office 1961–1966
- Preceded by: Sir Charles Stirling
- Succeeded by: Sir Anthony Lambert

Personal details
- Born: 12 October 1911
- Died: 25 January 1996 (aged 84)
- Education: New College, Oxford
- Occupation: Diplomat and civil servant

Sir Archibald David Manisty Ross (12 October 1911 – 25 January 1996) was a British diplomat and civil servant who served as British Ambassador to Portugal from 1961 to 1966 and British Ambassador to Sweden from 1966 to 1971.

== Early life and education ==
Ross was born on 12 October 1911, the son of J. A. Ross who was a member of the Indian Civil Service, and Dorothea née Manisty. He was educated at Winchester College and New College, Oxford where he took a double first.

== Career ==
Ross entered the Foreign Office in 1936, was first posted to Berlin in 1939 and was then at Stockholm during the War from 1939 to 1944. After working at the Foreign Office, he was posted to Tehran in 1947 where he served until 1950. From 1950 to 1953, he was counsellor at the Foreign Office, and served as head of the Permanent Under-Secretary's Department and head of the Eastern Department. In 1953, he was appointed minister at Rome, a post he held until 1956. Then from 1956 to 1961, he was assistant under-secretary for Foreign Affairs, responsible for Southern Europe, Africa and Middle East.

Ross served as Ambassador to Portugal from 1961 to 1966. In 1966, he was appointed Ambassador to Sweden, remaining in the post until his retirement in 1971. According to The Times, "Both missions were places that called for the decorum and calm judgment which were Ross's trademark and he conducted them well, but neither was of a weight to test his intellect and diplomatic skill to the full."

After retiring from the Diplomatic Service in 1971, Ross was chairman of the British subsidiaries of Swedish companies, Alfa Laval; Saab; Scania; and Ericsson.

== Personal life and death ==
Ross married Mary Melville Macfadyen in 1939 and they had a son and a daughter.

Ross died on 25 January 1996, aged 84.

== Honours ==
Ross was appointed Companion of the Order of St Michael and St George (CMG) in the 1953 Coronation Honours, and promoted to Knight Commander (KCMG) in the 1961 New Year Honours.

== See also ==
- Portugal–United Kingdom relations
- Sweden–United Kingdom relations

Diplomatic posts
Preceded by Sir Charles Stirling	British Ambassador to Portugal; 1961–1966	Succeeded by Sir Anthony Lambert
Preceded by Sir Moore Crosthwaite	British Ambassador to Sweden; 1966–1971	Succeeded by Sir Guy Millard
