= John Gordon Kennedy =

British diplomat

Sir John Gordon Kennedy, KCMG (18 July 1836 – 2 December 1912) was a British diplomat.

== Career ==
Kennedy was born in 1836, the son of John Kennedy (d. 1845) and his wife Amelia Maria Briggs (d. 1896). His father had been the British Chargé d'affaires in Naples, Italy, and was a grandson of the 11th Earl of Cassilis. His brothers included Admiral Sir William Robert Kennedy (1838–1916) and Gilbert George Kennedy (1844–1909).

He entered the Foreign Office in 1857, served in St Petersburg, and was Legation Secretary in Japan, 1879-82 where Ernest Satow knew him. He was Secretary at the British Embassy in Rome when in October 1888 he was appointed Minister Resident and Consul General to the Republic of Chile. He served in Chile until August 1897, when he was appointed Envoy Extraordinary and Minister Plenipotentiary to the Court of the King of Romania, serving as such until 1905.

Kennedy was knighted as Knight Commander of the Order of St Michael and St George (KCMG) in the 1901 New Year Honours.

== Family ==
Kennedy married, in 1877, Evelyn Adela Bootle-Wilbraham, daughter of Colonel Hon. Edward Bootle-Wilbraham, a son of the 1st Baron Skelmersdale.

Diplomatic posts
Preceded by Hugh Fraser	Minister Resident and Consul General to the Republic of Chile; 1888-1897	Succeeded by Audley Gosling
Preceded by Sir Hugh Wyndham	Envoy Extraordinary and Minister Plenipotentiary at the Court of the King of Roumania; 1897–1905	Succeeded by Conyngham Greene
