= The Portugal News =

Weekly newspaper in Portugal

- Type: National weekly newspaper
- Format: Broadsheet
- Founded: 1977; 48 years ago
- Language: English
- Headquarters: Lagoa, Portugal
- ISSN: 0873-7746
- Website: www.theportugalnews.com

The Portugal News is a national weekly newspaper in English published in Portugal.

== History and profile ==
Established in 1977, The Portugal News is published weekly. The paper is the longest established English-language newspaper in publication in Portugal. It is politically neutral and carries current comment on the latest political developments each week. News on a local and national level is carried from throughout Portugal, with the aim of keeping expatriate residents and visitors fully informed about Portugal in the English language.

The publication's website allows searching several years of editorials, which is useful for researching the country. The Portugal News publishes every Friday and has an audited circulation of over 20,000 copies each week, and the website has over 155,000 page views per week (September 2019). A fully featured ePaper is also available with every article, photo and advert and editions from the last 12 months. As at February 2025 the publication has 107,000 followers on Facebook.
