= Charles Empson =

British diplomat (1898–1983)

Sir Charles Empson KCMG

British Ambassador to Chile
- In office 1955–1958
- Preceded by: Charles Stirling
- Succeeded by: Ivor Pink

Personal details
- Born: 24 April 1898
- Died: 17 August 1983 (aged 85) Ickham, Kent
- Children: 2
- Education: Magdalene College, Cambridge
- Occupation: Diplomat

Sir Charles Empson (24 April 1898 – 17 August 1983) was a British diplomat who served as ambassador to Chile from 1955 to 1958.

== Early life and education ==
Empson was born on 24 April 1898, the son of Arthur Reginald Empson of Yokefleet, Yorkshire. He was educated at Harrow School and Magdalene College, Cambridge.

== Career ==
Empson served during World War I with the Royal Field Artillery in Mesopotamia from 1917 to 1919. In 1920, he joined the British legation in Baghdad led by the High Commissioner and served there as consul from 1924 to 1932 and commercial secretary from 1932 to 1934.

From 1934 to 1938, he was commercial agent for Palestine and from 1938 to 1939, commercial secretary at Rome. He then served as commercial counsellor at Cairo from 1939 to 1946 and minister (economic) and special commissioner in South-East Asia from 1946 to 1947. In 1947, he returned to Rome serving as minister (commercial) until 1950 before he was transferred to Washington serving as minister (commercial) until 1955. In 1955, he was appointed ambassador to Chile, a post he held until his retirement in 1958.

== Personal life and death ==
Empson married Monica Tomlin in 1931 and they had a son and a daughter.

Empson died on 17 August 1983 at Ickham, Kent, aged 85.

== Honours ==
Empson was appointed Companion of the Order of St Michael and St George (CMG) in the 1943 Birthday Honours, and promoted to Knight Commander (KCMG) in the 1956 New Year Honours.

== See also ==
- Chile–United Kingdom relations

Diplomatic posts
Preceded by Charles Stirling	British Ambassador to Chile; 1955–1958	Succeeded by Ivor Pink
