= Charles Orde =

British diplomat

Sir Charles William Orde, KCMG (25 October 1884 – 7 June 1980) was a British diplomat.

== Life and career ==
The eldest son of Lieutenant-Colonel William Orde, DL, of Nunnykirk, Morpeth, Northumberland, Orde was educated at Eton College and King's College, Cambridge, where he was an exhibitioner, graduating BA in 1907.

He entered the Foreign Office in 1909 as a clerk, and was promoted to the rank of counsellor in 1929. In the 1930s, he was with the League of Nations Department of the Foreign Office, and was secretary to the Arms Traffic Convention of 1925. He was British minister to Estonia, Latvia and Lithuania from 1938 to 1940 and British Ambassador to Chile from 1940 to 1945.

He died at Morpeth in 1980, aged 95.

== Family ==
Orde married in 1914, Frances Fortune (died 1949), only daughter of James Davidson, of Dunedin, New Zealand; they had two sons and two daughters. Their third child was Martin Orde, OBE, of the Colonial Service and the Scottish Office.
