= Frederick Robinson (Royal Navy officer) =

Vice-Admiral Frederick Robinson
- Born: 3 April 1836
- Died: 18 January 1896 (aged 59)
- Military career
- Allegiance: United Kingdom
- Branch: Royal Navy
- Rank: Vice-Admiral
- Commands: East Indies Station

Vice-Admiral Frederick Charles Bryan Robinson (3 April 1836 – 18 January 1896) was a Royal Navy officer who served as Commander-in-Chief, East Indies Station.

== Naval career ==
Born the son of Admiral Hercules Robinson, Robinson became a lieutenant in 1855. Promoted to Commander in 1863, he served in that rank in HMS Rinaldo from 1868 to 1871. He was appointed Commander-in-Chief, East Indies Station in 1891. He later became a Fellow of the Royal Geographical Society.

== Family ==
In 1864 he married Willamina Bradley; in 1889 he married for a second time, to Alice Tew.

Military offices
Preceded by Sir Edmund Fremantle	Commander-in-Chief, East Indies Station; 1891–1892	Succeeded by Sir William Kennedy
