= William Kennedy (Royal Navy officer) =

Admiral Sir William Kennedy GCB
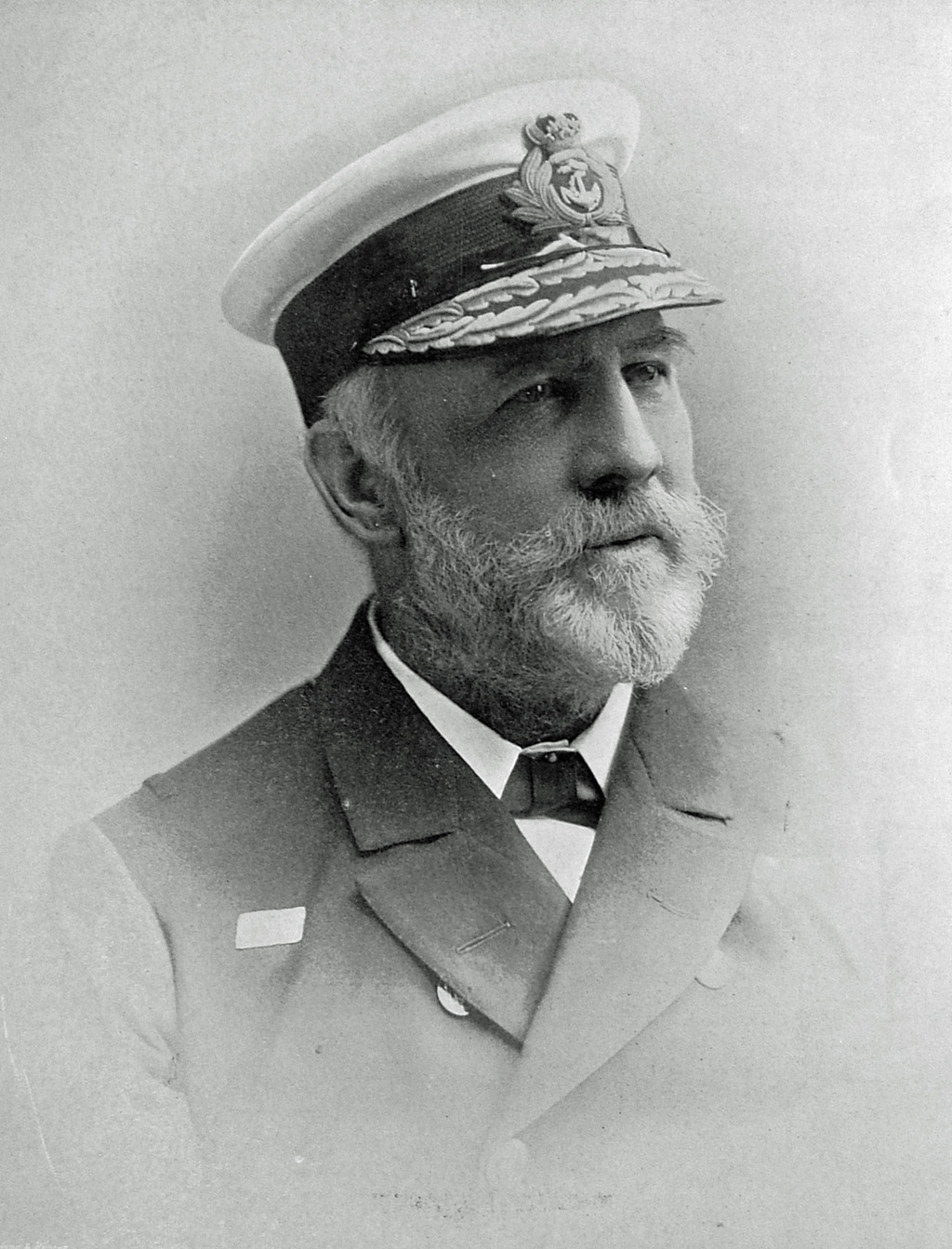
- Born: 4 March 1838; Naples, Kingdom of the Two Sicilies
- Died: 9 October 1916 (aged 78); Daventry, Northamptonshire, England
- Military career
- Allegiance: United Kingdom
- Branch: Royal Navy
- Service years: 1851–1901
- Rank: Admiral
- Commands: East Indies Station; Nore Command
- Conflicts: Crimean War; Second Opium War
- Awards: Knight Grand Cross of the Order of the Bath

Admiral Sir William Robert Kennedy GCB (4 March 1838 – 9 October 1916) was a Royal Navy officer who served as Commander-in-Chief, The Nore.

== Biography ==
Born in Naples, Kingdom of the Two Sicilies where his father John Kennedy was the British chargé d'affaires, Kennedy joined the Royal Navy in 1851 and served with the Naval Brigade during the Crimean War. He was present at the bombardment of Canton in 1856, at the Battle of Fatshan Creek in 1857 and at the attack on the Peiho Forts in 1858 during the Second Opium War.

As a lieutenant he next was appointed to the sloop Wasp and on the journey to Cape of Good Hope he jumped overboard to rescue a man that had fallen in; he was awarded a silver medal by the Royal Humane Society. He later sailed on the Narcissus and Victoria, the Mediterranean flagship.

Promoted to commander in 1867, he commanded the Vestal on the North American station and then the Reindeer in the Pacific. From 1879 to 1881 he commanded the Druid and was senior officer on the Newfoundland coast. He then commanded a coast-guard ship at Queensferry and then on to the Ruby as senior officer on the south-east coast of South America. In 1889 he was promoted to rear-admiral and from 1892 to 1895 and was Commander-in-Chief of the East Indies. Promoted to vice-admiral in 1896 he was appointed Commander-in-Chief, The Nore in 1900. He was promoted to Admiral 16 June 1901 and retired in November 1901. He was also an accomplished author who wrote an extensive autobiography and other books.

== Family life ==
Kennedy married Edith Louisa Stopford in Daventry in 1868; they had one daughter Alice Emily Kennedy. His brothers included Sir John Gordon Kennedy KCMG, who became an eminent diplomat, and Gilbert George Kennedy who played for the Scottish XI in the second international football match against England.

== Honours and awards ==
- 22 June 1897 – To celebrate the Diamond Jubilee of Queen Victoria Vice-Admiral William Robert Kennedy is appointed a Knight Commander of the Order of the Bath.
- 19 June 1911 – On the occasion of the Coronation of King George V, Admiral Sir William Robert Kennedy, KCB, is promoted to a Knight Grand Cross of the Order of the Bath.

== Works ==
- Sporting Adventures in the Pacific, Whilst in Command of the Reindeer (1876)
- Sport, Travel, and Adventure in Newfoundland and the West Indies (1885)
- Sporting Sketches in South America (1892)
- Hurrah for the Life of a Sailor: Fifty Years in the Royal Navy (1900)
- Sport in the Navy and Naval Yarns (1902)

Military offices
| Preceded by Frederick Robinson | Commander-in-Chief, East Indies Station; 1892–1895 | Succeeded by Edmund Drummond |
| Preceded by Sir Nathaniel Bowden-Smith | Commander-in-Chief, The Nore; 1900–1901 | Succeeded by Sir Albert Markham |
