= List of diplomats of the United Kingdom to Iran =

The ambassador of the United Kingdom to Iran is the United Kingdom's foremost diplomatic representative in the Islamic Republic of Iran, and in charge of the UK's diplomatic mission in Iran. The official title is His Majesty's Ambassador to the Islamic Republic of Iran.

Although Britain and Iran (originally Persia) did not enter into formal diplomatic relations until 1807, the British and the Iranians had been in informal contact since the early 17th century when the East India Company developed trade links with the Safavid Empire. Initially, diplomatic missions comprised a legation until they were promoted to embassy status in 1943.

At various times in history during crises or disputes, Britain has had no diplomatic presence in the country, and has either relied on other nations as protecting powers, or has had a non-resident diplomat.

== Heads of mission ==
=== Envoys extraordinary and ministers plenipotentiary (1807–1944) ===
- 1807–1811: Sir Harford Jones-Brydges, 1st Baronet, envoy extraordinary
- 1810–1814: Sir Gore Ouseley, Bt, ambassador extraordinary and plenipotentiary
- April 1814 – October 1815: James Morier, Minister Plenipotentiary (ad interim)
- 13 April 1814: Sir Henry Ellis, Deputy Minister Plenipotentiary (ad interim), in James Morier's absence
- 1815–22, 1823–26: Henry Willock, chargé d'affaires
- 1822–23: Major George Willock, deputy chargé d'affaires
- 29 July 1826: Colonel John Macdonald Kinneir, Envoy Extraordinary from Government of India
- British envoy to Persia, 1830-35: Sir John Campbell
- 1835–1836: Sir Henry Ellis, ambassador
- 1836–1842: Sir John McNeill, envoy extraordinary and minister plenipotentiary
  - No representation during the Siege of Herat
- 1844–1854: Lieutenant-Colonel Sir Justin Sheil, secretary of legation February 1836, Head of Mission 1839–44, envoy extraordinary and minister plenipotentiary 1844–54
- 1847–49: Lieutenant-Colonel Francis Farrant, chargé d'affaires
- 1849, 1853–55: Sir William Taylour Thomson, chargé d'affaires
- 1854–1855: Sir Charles Murray, envoy extraordinary and minister plenipotentiary
- 1855–1857: No representation due to the Anglo-Persian War
- 1857–1858: Sir Charles Murray, envoy extraordinary and minister plenipotentiary
- 1858–59: William Doria, chargé d'affaires
- 1859–1860: Lieutenant-Colonel Sir Henry Rawlinson, envoy extraordinary and minister plenipotentiary
- November–December 1859: Sir Ronald Thomson, chargé d'affaires
- 1860–1872: Charles Alison, envoy extraordinary and minister plenipotentiary April 1872
  - May–July 1860: Captain (later Colonel Sir) Lewis Pelly, chargé d'affaires
  - November–December 1862: Sir Ronald Thomson, chargé d'affaires
  - December 1862 – January 1863: Edward Eastwick, chargé d'affaires
  - 1863, 1869–70: Sir Ronald Thomson, chargé d'affaires
  - April–May 1872: William Dickson, chargé d'affaires
  - 1872–73: Sir Ronald Thomson, chargé d'affaires
- 1872–1879: Sir William Taylour Thomson, envoy extraordinary and minister plenipotentiary
  - 1878–79: Sir Ronald Thomson, chargé d'affaires
- 1879–1887: Sir Ronald Ferguson Thomson, envoy extraordinary and minister plenipotentiary
  - 1885–86: Sir Arthur Nicolson, chargé d'affaires
- 1887–1891: Sir Henry Drummond Wolff
  - 1889, November 1890, November 1891: Robert John Kennedy, chargé d'affaires
- 1891–1894: Sir Frank Lascelles
- 1894: Sir Conyngham Greene, chargé d'affaires
- 1894–1900: Sir Mortimer Durand
  - 1897–98: Lord Hardinge, chargé d'affaires
  - March 1900 – 1901: Sir Cecil Spring Rice, chargé d'affaires
- October 1900–1906: Sir Arthur Hardinge (appointed Consul-General)
  - October–November 1902: William Erskine, chargé d'affaires
  - 1904, 1905: Evelyn Grant Duff, chargé d'affaires
- 1906–1908: Sir Cecil Spring Rice
- 1908–1912: Sir George Barclay
- 1912–1915: Sir Walter Townley
- 1915–1918: Sir Charles Marling
- 1918–1920: Sir Percy Cox (ad interim)
- 1920–1921: Herman Norman
- 1921–1926: Sir Percy Loraine, Bt
- 1926–1931: Sir Robert Clive
- 1931–1934: Sir Reginald Hoare
- 1934–1936: Sir Hughe Knatchbull-Hugessen
- 1936–1939: Sir Horace Seymour
- 1942–1944: Sir Reader Bullard

=== Ambassadors extraordinary and plenipotentiary (1944–1980) ===
- 1944–1946: Sir Reader Bullard
- 1946–1950: Sir John Le Rougetel
- 1950–1952: Sir Francis Shepherd
- 1952–1953: No representation due to the nationalisation of the Anglo-Persian Oil Company
- 1954–1958: Sir Roger Stevens
- 1958–1963: Sir Geoffrey Harrison
- 1963–1971: Sir Denis Wright
- 1971–1974: Hon. Sir Peter Ramsbotham
- 1974–1979: Sir Anthony Parsons
- 1979–1980: Sir John Graham

=== Heads of British Interests Section, Royal Swedish Embassy, Tehran (1980–1990) ===
In 1980 Britain closed its embassy in Tehran after a brief occupation of the compound in the wake of the Iran hostage crisis and the Iranian Embassy siege, and was subsequently represented in the country by Sweden as a protecting power. Nonetheless, a small detachment of British personnel maintained a presence at the Swedish Embassy.

- 1980–1981: Stephen Barrett
- 1981–1983: Nicholas Barrington C.V.O.
- 1983–1988: Michael Simpson-Orlebar followed by Christopher MacRae. In May 1986, Iran blocked the appointment of Hugh James Arbuthnott as head of the British Interests Section in the Swedish embassy in Tehran. This was in retaliation for Britain refusing to accept Hussein Malouk as Iranian chargé d'affaires in London, due to his participation in the 1979 student takeover of the U.S. embassy.
- 1988: Paul Andrew Ramsay, Senior Visa Officer British Interests Section, Tehran
- 1989–1990: No representation due to the fatwā issued against Salman Rushdie

=== Ambassadors extraordinary and plenipotentiary (1990–present) ===
- 1990–1993: David Reddaway, Chargé d'affaires
- 1993–1997: Jeffrey Russell James, Chargé d'affaires
- 1997–2002: Sir Nicholas Browne
- 2003–2006: Sir Richard Dalton
- 2006–2009: Sir Geoffrey Adams
- 2009–2011: Sir Simon Gass
- 2011–2011: Dominick Chilcott

The British Embassy in Tehran was closed following an attack on the Embassy on 29 November 2011. Sweden represented British interests in Iran through a British interests section at the Swedish Embassy in Tehran. On 11 November 2013 the UK government appointed a non-resident chargé d'affaires to Iran.

- 2013–2015: Ajay Sharma (non-resident Chargé d'affaires)

On 23 August 2015 the UK embassy in Tehran was reopened and the Chargé d'affaires moved to be resident there. The Chargé d'affaires was made Ambassador in September 2016.

- August–November 2015: Ajay Sharma (chargé d'affaires)
- December 2015 – March 2018: Nicholas Hopton (as Chargé d'affaires until September 2016; then as Ambassador Extraordinary and Plenipotentiary)
- April 2018 – August 2021: Robert Macaire
- August 2021–2024: Simon Shercliff
- 2024–present: Hugo Shorter

== See also ==
- List of ambassadors of Iran to the United Kingdom
- Robert Macaire
