= The Norton Knatchbull School =

The Norton Knatchbull School Academy Trust

Location
- Hythe Road; Ashford, Kent, TN24 0QJ; England; 51.1463°N 0.8906°E

Information
- Type: Grammar school; Academy
- Motto: Benefactorum Recordatio Jucundissima Est (Latin: "Things done well make the best memories")
- Established: c. 1630; 396 years ago
- Founder: Norton Knatchbull
- Department for Education URN: 138019 Tables
- Ofsted: Reports
- Co-Chairs of Governors: Andrew Judd and Jane Burnett (2022-present)
- Head teacher: James Maclean
- Gender: Mixed (sixth form)
- Age: 11 to 19
- Enrolment: 1,098 as of September 2016
- Houses: Apps, Barrett, Burra, Harper, Knatchbull, Lamprey, Woodworth (founded 2016)
- Former names: Ashford Grammar School; The Norton Knatchbull Grammar School for Boys
- Former Pupils: Old Ashfordians
- Website: www.nks.kent.sch.uk

The Norton Knatchbull School is a grammar school with academy status for boys located in Ashford, Kent, England. Girls are accepted into the Sixth Form. As of 2017, the school serves more than one thousand pupils aged 11 to 18.

== History ==
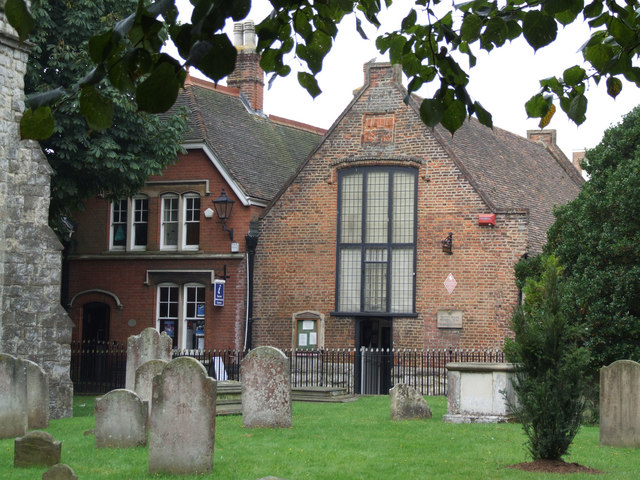
The former home of the school, now used by Ashford Museum

The school was founded in Ashford around 1630 as a free grammar school by its namesake who died in 1636, an uncle of Sir Norton Knatchbull. The school continued to be led and funded by Knatchbull's family due to a stipulation in his will in 1636. It was known simply as 'Ashford Grammar School' until the summer of 1973. The original school was based in the churchyard in the town centre, in the building known as Dr Wilks' Hall and which now houses the town's museum, but has moved several times. By the 20th century, it had moved to its present location on Hythe Road. The main building of the current school premises was built in the 1950s and has recently been renovated in 2015 as part of a major overhaul of the school's facilities. A number of additional buildings have been added to the site: the Brabourne Building in the early 1990s, the Mortimore Building in the early 2000s and the Fraser Building (Sports Hall) which was completed and opened in the mid-2000s. Alongside with these buildings we have the sixth form building and the DLC which has been recently created, a coupe of years back A new Digital Learning Centre is to be constructed on the site in order to facilitate an expected increase in the number of students attending the school as the surrounding area continues to grow. The Digital Learning Centre has since been completed in 2021.

It is one of two grammar schools in Ashford.

== Notable alumni ==
- Alex Brooker, journalist and presenter
- William Cole, classical scholar
- Sir Ronald Cooke, Vice-Chancellor of the University of York from 1993 to 2002, and President of the Royal Geographical Society from 2000 to 2003
- David Crawford CMG, Ambassador to Bahrain (briefly) in 1981, and Ambassador to Qatar from 1974 to 1978
- Roger Dean, artist
- Josh Doyle, lead singer of the Dum Dums
- Bob Holness, presenter
- Phil Hubbard, University of Kent
- Ian Field, British cyclo-cross star
- Gary Hume, artist
- Matthew King, composer
- Robert Kirby-Harris, Chief Executive of the Institute of Physics 2005-
- Prof Leonard Marsh OBE, Principal of Bishop Grosseteste College, Lincoln from 1974 to 1996, and Chairman of the National Association for Primary Education from 1981 to 1983
- Daniel Pearce, former bandmate of One True Voice
- Surgeon Vice-Admiral Anthony Revell CB, Surgeon General of the Ministry of Defence 1994

== See also ==
- Highworth Grammar School for Girls
- Spelthorne College (former Ashford County Grammar School in Middlesex)
