= Attempted assassination of Timothy Torlot =

2010 suicide bombing in Sanaa, Yemen

- Part of the al-Qaeda insurgency in Yemen
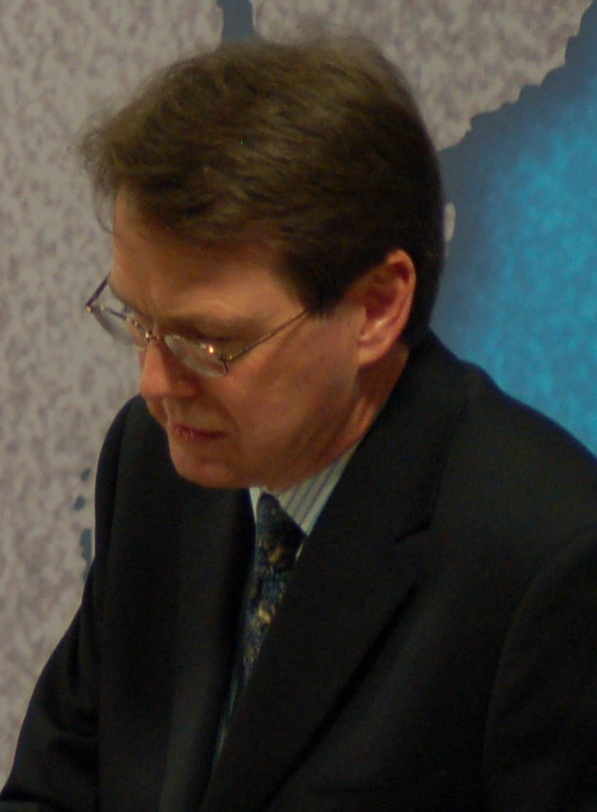
- Torlot at the Friends of Yemen conference in 2010
- Location: Sanaa, Yemen
- Date: 26 April 2010 c. 08:00 (UTC+03:00)
- Target: Timothy Torlot
- Attack type: Suicide bombing
- Weapon: Explosive belt
- Deaths: 1 (the perpetrator)
- Injuries: 3 bystanders
- Perpetrator: al-Qaeda in the Arabian Peninsula
- Assailant: Othman Ali Nouman al-Salawi †
- Accused: 4

On 26 April 2010, a suicide bomber attempted to assassinate Timothy Torlot, the ambassador of the United Kingdom to Yemen, as he was heading to the British embassy in the Yemeni capital of Sanaa. The bomber, identified as 22-year-old Othman Ali Nouman al-Salawi, disguised himself as a student and waited along a busy street which led to the embassy. As Torlot's two-vehicle convoy arrived and slowed down along the street, Salawi ran up to them and detonated a hidden explosive belt, killing himself but narrowly missing Torlot's car as he was too slow in reaching it. Torlot and his security escort escaped unharmed, while three bystanders suffered injuries.

The assassination attempt was claimed by al-Qaeda in the Arabian Peninsula (AQAP) as a response to the UK's growing support for the Yemeni government. Yemeni authorities arrested four militants in relation to the attack but none were charged with involvement. Foreign Secretary David Miliband condemned the bombing, and the British embassy was temporarily closed afterwards. Analysts noted it was AQAP's first attack in the capital in over a year, possibly serving to demonstrate its continued threat in the face of intensified local counterterrorism operations since the previous year.

== Background ==
At the end of 2009, al-Qaeda in the Arabian Peninsula (AQAP) came to international prominence after attempting a failed attack on an American passenger jet. Numerous Western nations began signalling increased support for the Yemeni government in response to the threat posed by the group, among them the United Kingdom. In January 2010, Prime Minister Gordon Brown hosted an international conference in London centred on Yemen which led to the establishment of Friends of Yemen, a British-led international contact group centred on financial support for the country.

The months preceding the assassination attempt saw little violence in Sanaa despite an AQAP statement earlier in the year which threatened a major attack in the capital. The group had previously attacked other diplomatic targets in Sanaa, most prominently an assault on the United States embassy in 2008 which left 16 people dead. The latest attack was in March 2009 against a South Korean government delegation. In December of that year, local security forces disrupted an AQAP cell which was planning an attack on the British embassy, which was later closed for a brief period in January 2010 because of threats to local Western interests. Yemen's Ministry of Interior announced on 16 April that foreign embassies would undergo heightened security protocols.

The Friends of Yemen meeting caught the attention of AQAP leader Nasir al-Wuhayshi. With high security at the US embassy he focused on local British targets to attack. The embassy itself may have been ruled out due to its own layers of protection. But the ambassador Timothy Torlot, unlike other local diplomats, lived away from the embassy compound and commuted to work every day via motorcade. Torlot had been the ambassador since July 2007 and, according to GlobalPost, "was known as a hands-on diplomat and one of the few in Yemen who still ventured outside protected compounds." As a security precaution he commonly differentiated the time at which he left his home for the British embassy and the route he took to it.

== Attack ==
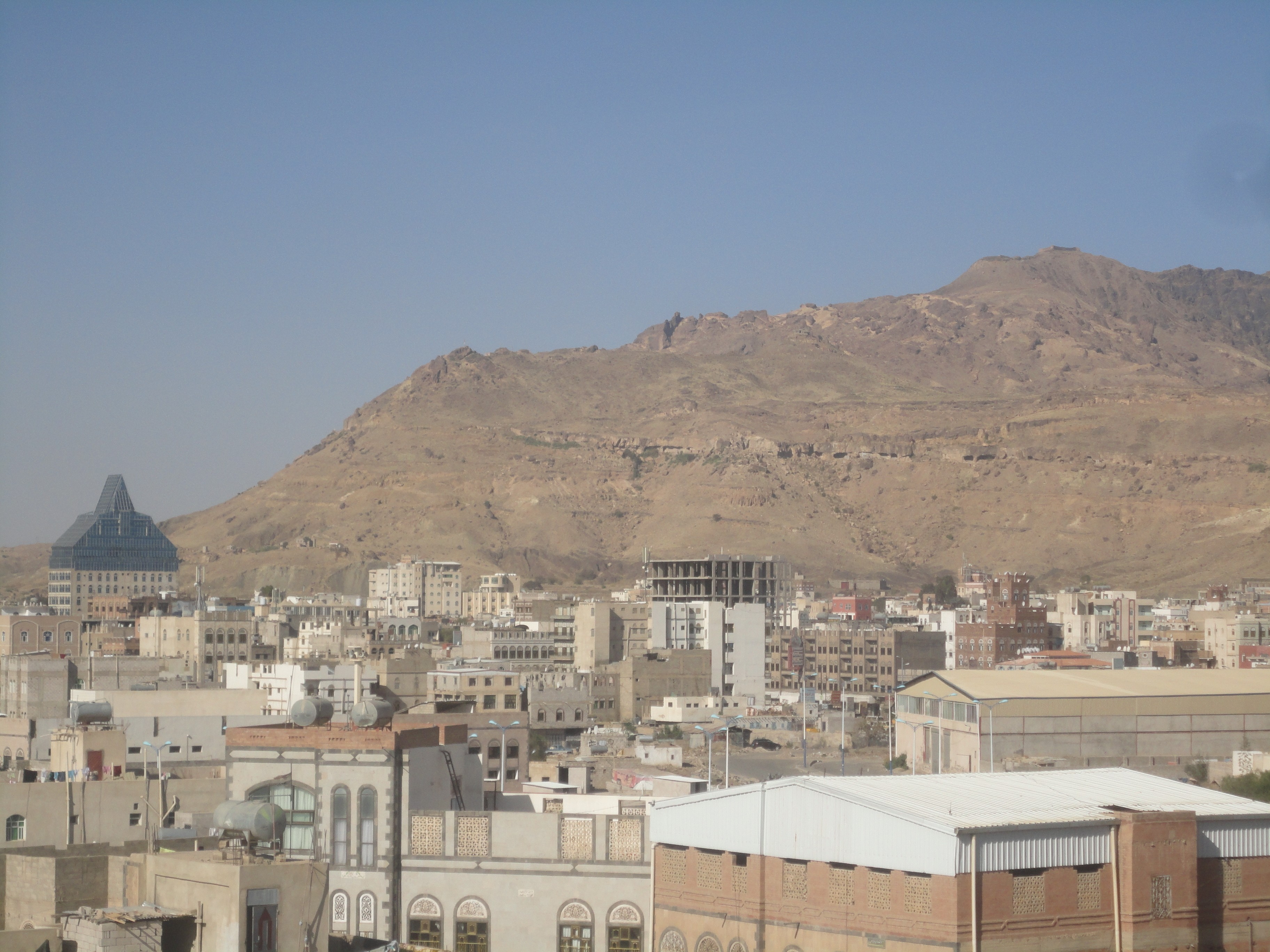
Naqm, the neighbourhood of Sanaa where the assassination attempt took place.

On the morning of 26 April 2010, a suicide bomber attempted to assassinate Torlot in Sanaa as he commuted to the British embassy. The attack occurred in Naqm, a neighbourhood in eastern Sanaa containing many governmental and diplomatic offices. Local officials said the neighbourhood was "known to be popular with militants."

The bomber reportedly exited a black vehicle with tinted windows five minutes prior, approximately 600 meters away from the embassy. Stratfor determined that as he waited for Torlot, he positioned himself "approximately 10 feet above on the opposite road of the two-way, one-lane Berlin Street", near the Berlin Garden and adjacent to an abandoned petrol station. He reportedly disguised himself as a student, wearing a school uniform with trainers and a rucksack. Underneath his brightly-coloured tracksuit was a suicide belt.

Torlot took the same route to the embassy where the bomber was positioned. At around 08:00 local time, Torlot's vehicle and a police car in front escorting him decelerated in an open part of Berlin Street as they neared a bend. Upon their approach, the bomber dropped down to the street, ran towards the convoy and detonated his explosives adjacent to a concrete half wall, possibly intending to use the surface to direct the blast towards the vehicles. It rocked the two vehicles and lightly damaged the police escort, while the windows of nearby buildings were shattered and concrete in a 10 ft-wide radius of the site was burnt. The bomber's remains were scattered around the vicinity.

The assassination attempt failed as the bomber was too slow in reaching Torlot's vehicle before the device detonated, damaging only the back portion of the convoy. Witnesses told The Guardian that "the explosion went off before the convoy passed and that an armoured vehicle with diplomatic plates and with its windscreen shattered was seen driving away against the traffic." Torlot was confirmed to have escaped unharmed and carried on with his duties for the rest of the day according to his partner. Three bystanders, including a woman, suffered non-serious injuries and were treated at a hospital.

== Responsibility ==
The assassination attempt initially went unclaimed, but Yemeni officials suspected the involvement of AQAP. SITE Intelligence Group reported on 11 May that AQAP had claimed responsibility for the attack in a statement posted on jihadist forums, confirming they had targeted Torlot, who they referred to as "the so-called British ambassador, who leads the war against Muslims in the Arabian Peninsula on behalf of his state." It proclaimed that "Britain is America's closest ally in its war on Islam, and it is the one which called the London conference, in which it plotted against the Arabian Peninsula," and also condemned the UK for its role in the establishment of Israel. It also confirmed the identity of the bomber and attributed him to the "Sheikh Abu Omar al-Baghdadi" brigade.

=== Perpetrator ===
The attacker was identified by authorities as Othman Ali Nouman al-Salawi, a 22-year-old Yemeni from Taiz. Salawi was the son of a construction contractor and had a happy upbringing according to his father. He studied at an Islamic institution in Sanaa where he was introduced to a returned fighter from Iraq, who influenced him in joining a group of students preparing to join the insurgency. They were arrested by authorities before they could do so. In prison, Salawi was indoctrinated by veteran militants such as Wuhayshi and Fawaz al-Rabeiee.

After spending two years in prison, Salawi was released to his parents on the conditions that he would attend school and check in with authorities daily. Reuters and Associated Press both report he was released in early 2010, but Yemen Times instead said he was released "more than a year ago." After being released, Salawi studied engineering at Al Saeed University and got engaged. A friend recalled that he did not exhibit his previous Salafi extremist views. But he disappeared in mid-March 2010, his location unbeknownst to his family who alerted authorities. He likely began to prepare for the attack on the directive of al-Qaeda during this time. Authorities claimed he attended a training camp in Marib Governorate.

== Investigation ==
Security forces cordoned off the scene of the attack and launched an investigation, with the Ministry of Interior sending in police units and investigators. Both Yemeni and British officials were seen at the location, with all authorities having left by noon. Salawi's intact head, found on a rooftop around 20 to 60 metres away from the site, was collected and a photograph of it was shown to his father during the day, who confirmed his identity. Investigators were looking into how Salawi had identified the convoy route and got so close to the vehicle. The British embassy said they were collaborating with Yemeni authorities in the investigation.

Dozens of suspects were detained the next day, including seven men previously arrested alongside Salawi. Interrogators questioned several former terrorism offenders but they were all released. A Yemeni official said police had raided several homes in Sanaa on 28 April and detained alleged militants. A day later, interior minister Mutaher al-Masri announced the arrest of those behind the attack. A Ministry of Defense statement issued on 24 June listed four individuals; two Yemenis along with a German and an Iraqi national, who were detained and being questioned in relation to the bombing. They were charged on 20 September for plotting terrorist attacks in Yemen, but not for the assassination attempt as the Yemeni government first claimed, although prosecutors said they had trained alongside Salawi.

== Aftermath ==
=== Response ===
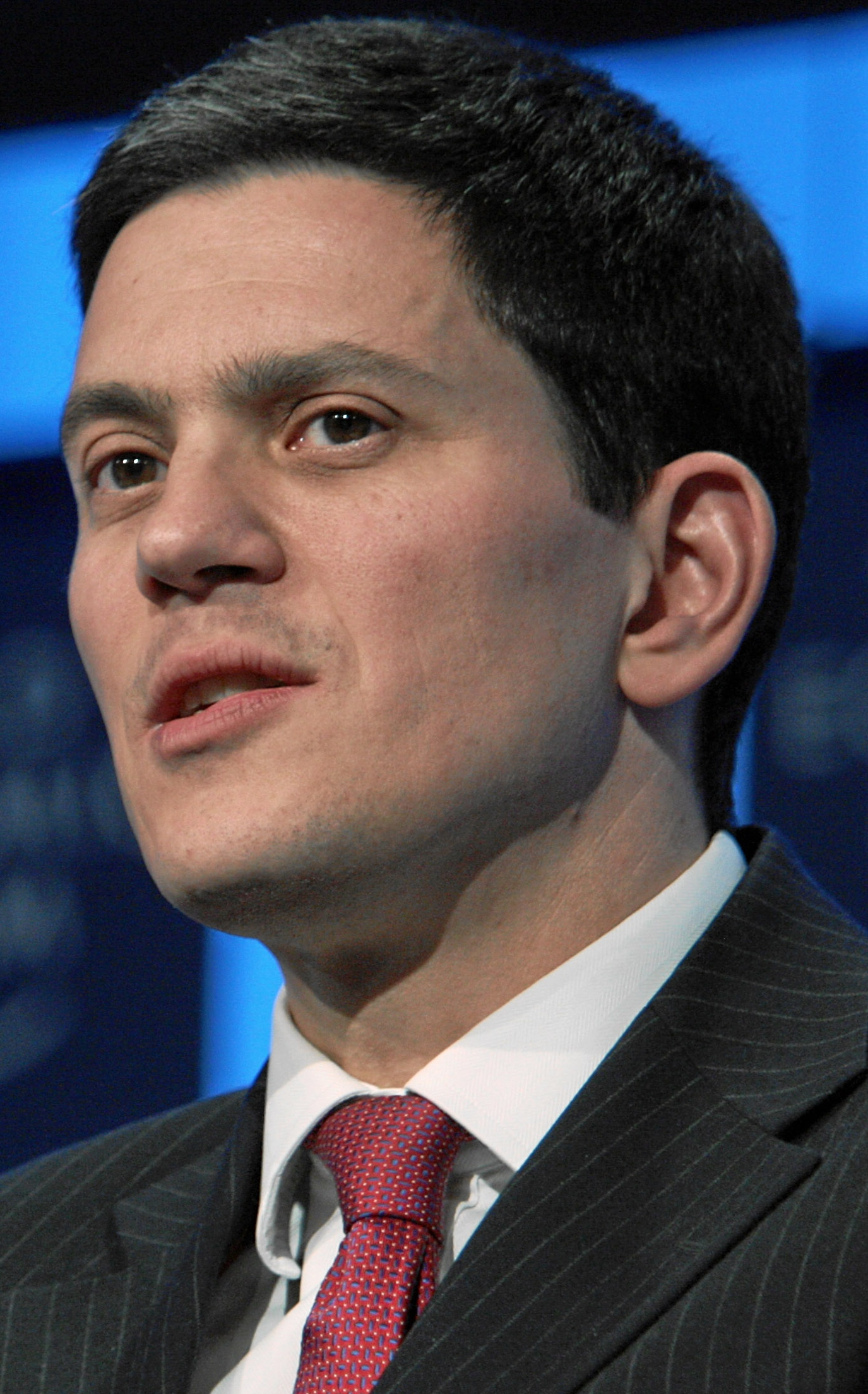
The attack was condemned by British foreign secretary David Miliband.

A statement from the British embassy in Sanaa confirmed an explosion near Torlot's vehicle and announced a temporary closure to the public. It suggested "all British nationals in Yemen to keep a low profile and remain vigilant." Torlot's wife said relatives of officials working at the embassy were evacuated from Yemen. The embassy said the attack would not affect the British government's goal of spending at least £100 million to bolster economic development in Yemen by the end of 2010. Spokeswoman Chantel Mortimer said that insecurity hindered economic progress and job opportunities in the country and that "young Yemenis are the ones who are hurt most by attacks like today's." Foreign Secretary David Miliband condemned the attack and reiterated the UK's support for the Yemeni government in fighting terrorism.

The Yemeni parliament issued a statement condemning the attack as against moral and Islamic values. It stated that relations between Yemen and the UK would not be hindered by it. Presidential advisor Abdul-Karim al-Iryani called it "one of the most serious acts of terrorism to have happened in Yemen" and reiterated the government's determination in fighting AQAP. 26 September, a government-affiliated newspaper, published a Ministry of Interior statement which claimed the attack reflected the desperation of the militants after counterterrorism operations by security forces. Mohammed al-Basha, spokesperson of the Yemeni embassy in Washington, D.C., suggested the bombing may have been in response to an operation in Hodeidah on 18 April which saw the killing of two militants and the capture of one.

Security procedures at the American and British embassies were "visibly tightened" after the attack. The US embassy issued a statement on 1 May advising staff to avoid the Mövenpick Hotel, a popular establishment among Westerners in Sanaa near where the attack occurred. The British embassy later reopened to the public on 9 May.

=== Analysis ===
Analysts and observers interpreted the attack, the first in the capital in over a year and against a high-profile Westerner, as a signal of AQAP's continued threat in Yemen. Bernard Haykel, professor of Near Eastern Studies at Princeton University, believed the assassination could have been a major victory for AQAP if successful, and that the group was "clearly looking for symbolically important targets to make a statement." Jonathan Rugman of Channel 4 News said AQAP may ward off inward investment, which could reduce the appeal of militancy locally. Foreign development workers lamented that the attack would likely lead to further security protocols placed on them regarding movement and interaction with locals, making their projects more difficult.

Theodore Karasik of the Institute for Near East and Gulf Military Analysis believed the attack would be the first in "a new campaign of targeted assassinations". Gregory D. Johnsen, a Yemen expert at Princeton, noted that AQAP had been weakened from months of counterterrorism operations prior, and said that whether the assassination attempt was an isolated incident or the beginning of a larger campaign would allow for a proper assessment of US-Yemeni operations against the group.

BBC Middle East editor Jeremy Bowen queried about "the degree of organisation behind the attempted assassination." Writing for the Combating Terrorism Center, analyst Christopher Boucek noted the similarity of the assassination attempt to the attack on the South Korean convoy in 2009. He wrote that "In both incidents, the attackers knew their targets' vehicles, routes and schedules, suggesting a level of prior knowledge. These attacks were especially concerning due to the heightened sense of vulnerability and exposure that comes with sitting in traffic in Sanaa." An assessment from Stratfor concluded that the failure of the attack "demonstrates the difficulty of effectively neutralizing a target in motion, particularly for a poorly trained or inexperienced operative."
