= Washington Report on Middle East Affairs =

U.S. foreign policy magazine

- October 2025 issue
- Executive Editor: Delinda C. Hanley
- Categories: Arab–Israeli conflict, Israeli–Palestinian conflict
- Frequency: 8 times a year
- Publisher: Andrew I. Killgore
- First issue: 1982
- Company: American Educational Trust
- Country: United States
- Based in: Washington, D.C.
- Language: English
- Website: http://www.wrmea.org/
- ISSN: 8755-4917

The Washington Report on Middle East Affairs (also known as The Washington Report and WRMEA) is an American foreign policy magazine that focuses on the Middle East and U.S. policy in the region.

It was characterized as "critical of United States policies in the Middle East" in 1998, and "a non-partisan publication that has been critical of Bush's policies" in 2005. Pro-Israel organizations accuse the magazine of being anti-Israel and conspiratorial in its criticism of Israel.

== History ==
The Washington Report is published by the American Educational Trust (AET), a non-profit founded in 1982 in Washington, D.C. by Edward Firth Henderson, former British Ambassador to Qatar, Andrew Killgore, who was U.S. Ambassador to Qatar when he retired from the United States Foreign Service in 1980, and Richard Curtiss, a former head of the Arabic Service of the Voice of America. Killgore is the publisher and Curtiss was the Executive Editor until his death in 2013. Delinda C. Hanley, Curtiss's daughter, is the current editor.

To counteract what the magazine's publishers viewed as a "pro-Zionist bias" in libraries, AET donated 3,200 free subscriptions and dozens of books "from its approved list" to libraries.

In 1989, Washington Report founders Andrew Killgore and Richard Curtiss joined other plaintiffs in complaining that the Federal Election Commission had improperly refused to label American Israel Public Affairs Committee (AIPAC), a pro-Israel lobbying group, a "political action committee" (PAC) and require AIPAC to disclose the sources and uses of money. The case went to the United States Supreme Court. The Supreme Court ruled in a majority decision that the plaintiffs had the right to raise issues regarding AIPAC, but referred the PAC matter back to the FEC because the FEC was drafting its membership threshold rules to directly address the unclear issue. The FEC decided that AIPAC did not spend an amount of time or money on political issues to make it a PAC, and in 2010 the last of WRMEA's appeals to have the FEC ruling reversed was dismissed.

In 2008, a number of publications reported that Mohammed Omer, the Gaza correspondent for the Washington Report, was hospitalized after Israeli soldiers cracked his ribs and inflicted other injuries at a crossing from Jordan into the occupied West Bank. The Israeli government disputed Omer's claims.

In 2004, AET's Andrew Killgore spearheaded a letter to President Bush signed by a number of former British and U.S. diplomats objecting to US policy towards Israel and the Palestinians, especially then Prime Minister Ariel Sharon's plan to leave Gaza without bothering to negotiate with Palestinian representatives.

AET sponsored a day-long seminar at the National Press Club in April 2015 entitled "The Israel Lobby: Is It Good for the U.S.? Is It Good for Israel?". According to the Baltimore Jewish Times, the seminar discussed "the so-called Jewish lobby’s power to influence politicians on Capitol Hill and the Obama administration," writing that "factual inaccuracies throughout the day were plenty".

== Editorial positions ==
The BBC said in 2004 that WRMEA's reporting is meant to counter what it considers the "too pro-Israeli stance of the U.S. media". The Baltimore Jewish Times described WRMEA in 2021 as an "anti-Israel, pro-Palestinian semimonthly publication."

In early 1990, WRMEA stated that criticism of Israel should not be equated with antisemitism.

WRMEA publishes listings of pro-Israel political action committee contributions to congressional candidates for each Congress, as well as elected representatives' voting records during each Congress. This resource has been quoted by a number of publications over the years.

== Criticism ==
Pro-Israel and Jewish activists have criticized the Washington Report as conspiratorial and polemical in its criticism of Israel. In the Middle East Quarterly in 1997, Michael Lewis of AIPAC claimed the Washington Report was the "most conspiratorially-minded of the anti-Israel forces" for promoting what it called conspiracy theories about Israel, including regarding the USS Liberty incident, and for accusing Israel and Zionists of being collectively responsible for many issues in the United States and the Middle East.

Pro-Israel critics quoted in Jewish Journal in 2006 said the Washington Report was guilty of frequent factual distortion, accusing the magazine as "an unrelenting polemic against Israel".

In 2000, Jonathan S. Tobin wrote in Jewish World Review that the publication was "the guidebook to the Arabist lobby in the United States," that it "specializes in defaming Israel", and that it is "a must-read for friends of Israel who want a reliable indicator of the thinking of the anti-Israel crowd."

Rafael Medoff of the David Wyman Institute for Holocaust Studies wrote in 2002 that "in addition to the standard denunciations of Israeli policies, the Washington Report published articles belittling the magnitude of the Holocaust, listing the names of Jewish publishers of leading U.S. newspapers to demonstrate 'Zionist' control of the media, and accusing Israel of 'Nazi-style' genocide against the Arabs. Each issue is filled with wild conspiracy theories about Israel and pro-Israel lobbying groups, accusing them of orchestrating everything from the Monica Lewinsky scandal to the assassination of John F. Kennedy."

During the George W. Bush administration, the Anti-Defamation League criticized the publication for hosting an essay by Paul Craig Roberts in which he writes the "fanatical neoconservatives and Israelis are using Bush to commit the United States to a catastrophic course." The pro-Israel media watchdog Committee for Accuracy in Middle East Reporting in America ("CAMERA") in 2006 described Washington Report as being "virulently anti-Israel".

In February 2010, Fox News wrote that the Washington Report had deleted from a 2007 article a comment by Rashad Hussain, the newly appointed U.S. envoy to the Organisation of Islamic Cooperation (OIC), calling the prosecution of Sami Al-Arian a "politically motivated persecution". Editor Delinda Hanley told Fox News she believed the change was made in February 2009, because the comments attributed to Hussain were actually made by Sami al-Arian's daughter, Laila, who also attended the event. But article's author, Shereen Kandil, told Fox News that she had not confused the two people. The White House also attributed the comments to Al-Arian's daughter. Hussain himself said he had made the remarks in response to a question from Laila Al-Arian, but had complained to the Washington Report shortly after they were published that they "lacked context", and the publication eventually removed the remarks.

== See also ==
- Council for the National Interest
- Israel lobby in the United States
- Palestine lobby in the United States
