= Robert Macaire =

Robert Macaire may refer to:

- Robert Macaire (character), a fictional character who appears in French plays, films, and other works of art
- Robert Macaire (diplomat) (born 1966), British diplomat
