= Jamie Bowden =

Jamie Bowden is the name of:

- Jamie Bowden (diplomat) (born 1960), British diplomat
- Jamie Bowden (footballer) (born 2001), English footballer
