= Stephen P. Day =

British diplomat (1938–2023)

Stephen Peter Day CMG (19 January 1938 – 14 March 2023) was a British diplomat who served as ambassador to Qatar and Tunisia. He became publicly known in 2011 for a letter criticising Prince Andrew, Duke of York, which preceded the Duke's resignation as the UK's special representative for international trade and investment.

== Early life and education ==
Day was born in Ilford, Essex. He was educated at Bancroft's School before studying at Corpus Christi College, Cambridge.

== Career ==
=== Diplomatic career ===
Day began his career in 1961 in the British Overseas Civil Service, with a posting to Aden during its violent struggle for independence. Following the dissolution of the Overseas Civil Service, he joined the Foreign Office. His subsequent assignments included postings in Singapore, New York (at the British mission to the United Nations), Beirut, and a term as consul-general in Edmonton, Canada.

In 1982, Day was appointed British ambassador to Qatar. He was later seconded to the household of the Prince and Princess of Wales, where he assisted Prince Charles with his developing interest in Islamic culture. During this period, Day and the Prince developed a project to aid the integration of Britain's Muslim community, which secured funding commitments but was ultimately cancelled following opposition from Prime Minister Margaret Thatcher. As ambassador to Tunisia, Day facilitated diplomatic engagement between Western governments and the Palestine Liberation Organisation (PLO), then based in Tunis. He later served as trade commissioner in Hong Kong, where he was involved in preparations for establishing a British consulate prior to the 1997 transfer of sovereignty to China. He retired in 1993.

=== Involvement in the Prince Andrew controversy ===
In 2011, Day authored a private letter to then-Foreign Secretary William Hague recommending Prince Andrew's removal from his trade envoy role. The letter cited concerns about the Duke's associations with controversial figures, including Sakher al-Materi, son-in-law of former Tunisian president Zine El Abidine Ben Ali, and Colonel Muammar Gaddafi of Libya. The letter was leaked and received media attention. Prince Andrew resigned from the position several months later.

=== Role in the Scott inquiry ===
Day appeared before the Scott Inquiry in the 1990s, which investigated arms exports to Iran and Iraq. He was questioned about a memorandum written in 1984 while he headed the Foreign Office’s Middle East department, which referred to a proposed change in arms export policy and the suggestion that it should be introduced without public announcement.

== Recognition ==
Following his retirement, Day worked as a consultant on Middle East issues and served as chairman of the British Tunisian Society for 15 years. He was appointed Companion of the Order of St Michael and St George (CMG) in 1989.
