= John Hawkins (diplomat) =

British diplomat

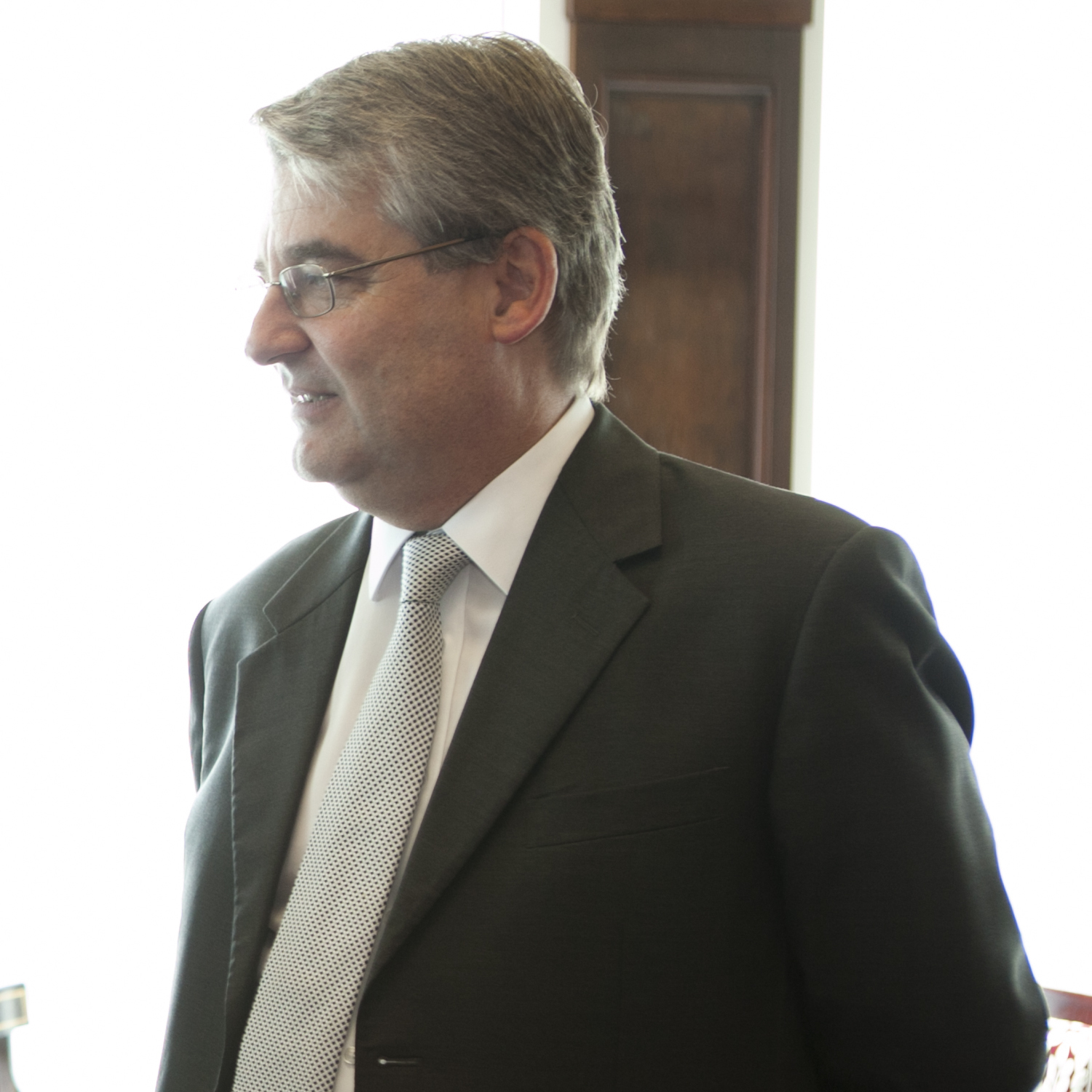
- Hawkins in 2011
- Born: 30 April 1960
- Occupation: British diplomat

John Mark Hawkins (born 30 April 1960) is a British diplomat.

Hawkins was educated at Bedford School and at New College, Oxford, where he read Modern History. He joined the British Diplomatic Service in 1982 and, following diplomatic postings in South Africa, India, Spain and Dubai, he served as British Ambassador to Qatar between 2008 and 2012.

Diplomatic posts
Preceded by Roderick Drummond	British Ambassador to Qatar; 2008-2012	Succeeded by Michael O'Neill
