= Swedish Red Cross =

Swedish humanitarian organization

- Svenska Röda Korset
- Logo of the Swedish Red Cross
- Formation: 1865
- Purpose: Humanitarian Aid
- Headquarters: Stockholm, Sweden
- Region served: Sweden
- President: Anna Hägg-Sjöquist
- Secretary General: Ulrika Modéer
- Parent organization: International Federation of Red Cross and Red Crescent Societies
- Staff: 626 (2013)
- Volunteers: 28,000 (2013)
- Website: www.rodakorset.se

The Swedish Red Cross (Swedish: Svenska Röda Korset) is a Swedish humanitarian organisation and a member of the International Red Cross and Red Crescent Movement. Founded in 1865, its purpose is to prevent and alleviate human suffering wherever and whenever it occurs, voluntarily and without discrimination. Within Sweden, it operates more than 1,000 local branches, which are run by local committees.

== History ==
=== Red Cross Hospital in the Korean War ===
From September 1950 to April 1957. Swedish Red Cross Hospital provided the medical service in South Korea during Korean War.

== See also ==
- Dolo hospital airstrike
- White Buses
