= Nicholas Hopton =

British diplomat

His Excellency Nicholas Hopton
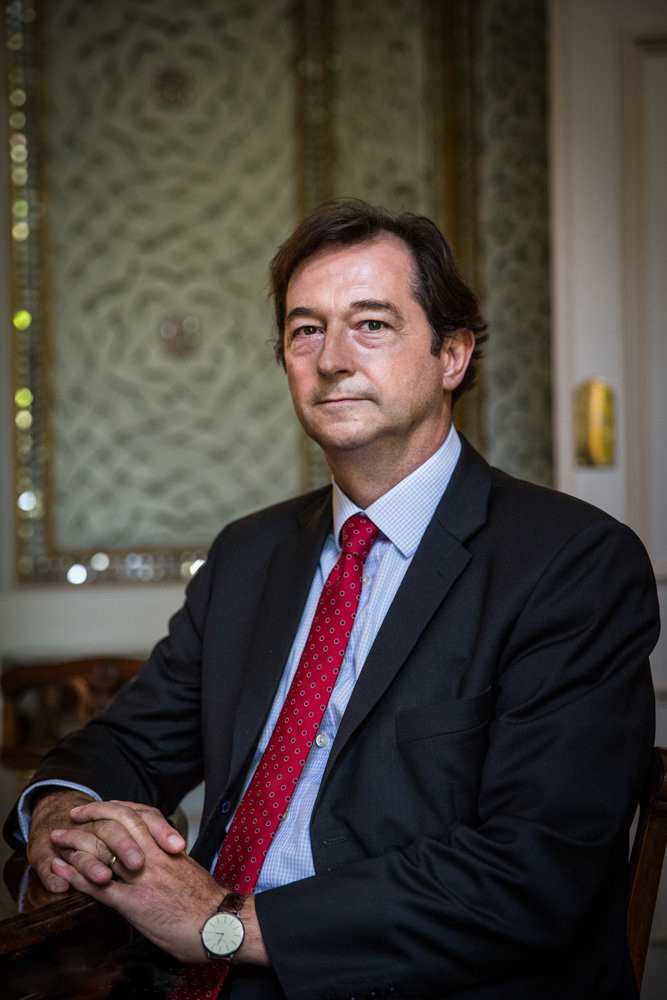

British Ambassador to Libya
- In office 9 September 2019 – 1 September 2021
- Monarch: Elizabeth II
- Prime Minister: Boris Johnson
- Preceded by: Martin Reynolds
- Succeeded by: Caroline Hurndall

British Ambassador to Iran
- In office September 2016 – March 2018
- Monarch: Elizabeth II
- Prime Minister: Theresa May
- Preceded by: Himself (as chargé d'affaires)
- Succeeded by: Robert Macaire

British Ambassador to Qatar
- In office 2013–2015
- Monarch: Elizabeth II
- Prime Minister: David Cameron
- Preceded by: Michael O'Neill
- Succeeded by: Ajay Sharma

British Ambassador to Yemen
- In office 2012–2013
- Monarch: Elizabeth II
- Prime Minister: David Cameron
- Preceded by: Jonathan Wilks
- Succeeded by: Jane Marriott

Personal details
- Born: 8 October 1965 (age 60)
- Education: St Peter's School, York
- Alma mater: Magdalene College, Cambridge

Nicholas Dunster Hopton (born 8 October 1965) is a British diplomat who was the head of the UK embassy in Libya.

Hopton was educated at St Peter's School, York and Magdalene College, Cambridge. He joined the Foreign and Commonwealth Office in 1989 and served in Paris, Rome and Rabat. He worked on the national security team at the Cabinet Office and was Private Secretary to the Minister of State for Europe.

He assumed his first ambassadorial position as Ambassador to Yemen from 2012 to 2013, before serving as Ambassador to Qatar between 2013 and 2015. In December 2015 he was appointed British chargé d'affaires in Iran. Following the improvement in relations between the United Kingdom and Iran, Hopton was made Ambassador to Iran in September 2016 – the first British ambassador to the country since 2011. He was appointed chargé d'affaires at the British embassy in Libya in September 2019. He was succeeded by Caroline Hurndall in September 2021.

From 2013 to 2014 Hopton was a visiting academic at St Antony's College, Oxford.

Diplomatic posts
Preceded by Jonathan Wilks	British Ambassador to Yemen; 2012–2013	Succeeded by Jane Marriott
Preceded by Michael O'Neill	British Ambassador to Qatar; 2013–2015	Succeeded by Ajay Sharma
Preceded by Himself as chargé d'affaires	British Ambassador to Iran; 2016–2018	Succeeded by Robert Macaire
Preceded by Martin Reynolds	British Ambassador to Libya; 2019–2021	Succeeded by Caroline Hurndall
