= David Crawford (diplomat) =

British diplomat (1928–1981)

David Gordon Crawford CMG (10 June 1928 – 6 September 1981) was a British diplomat who was ambassador to Qatar and to Bahrain.

== Career ==
Crawford was educated at Ashford Grammar School (The Norton Knatchbull School) and the London School of Economics. He served in the Royal Army Educational Corps 1947–55 and joined the Diplomatic Service in 1956. He studied at the Middle East Centre for Arabic Studies, then served at Taiz, Bahrain, New York, Amman and at the Foreign Office (later the Foreign and Commonwealth Office, FCO). He was Consul-General at Muscat 1969–71, head of Accommodation and Services at the FCO 1971–74, Ambassador to Qatar 1974–78, Consul-General at Atlanta 1978–81, and was appointed Ambassador to Bahrain in August 1981. However, he died of a stroke at Bahrain only a month after taking up the post.

Crawford was appointed CMG in the 1981 Birthday Honours.

Diplomatic posts
Preceded by Douglas Gordon	Ambassador Extraordinary and Plenipotentiary to the State of Qatar; 1974–78	Succeeded by Colin Brant
Preceded by Harold Walker	Ambassador at Bahrain; 1981	Succeeded by Roger Tomkys
