= Jeffrey James (diplomat) =

British diplomat

Sir Jeffrey Russell James KBE CMG

High Commissioner to Kenya
- In office 1997–2001
- Monarch: Elizabeth II
- Preceded by: Simon Hemans
- Succeeded by: Edward Clay

Chargé d'affaires to Iran
- In office 1993–1997
- Monarch: Elizabeth II
- Preceded by: David Reddaway
- Succeeded by: Nicholas Browne

Personal details
- Born: August 1944 (age 82)
- Education: Keele University

Sir Jeffrey Russell James KBE CMG (born August 1944) is a retired British diplomat who served as High Commissioner to Kenya from 1997 to 2001 and the chargé d'affaires to Iran from 1993 to 1997.

== Education ==
James attended Keele University in Staffordshire, England from 1963 to 1967, graduating with a first-class bachelor's degree in international relations. In 2005, he given an honorary Doctor of Letters degree by the university.

== Diplomatic service ==
James joined the Foreign and Commonwealth Office in 1967. From 1970 to 1973, he worked as a secretary in Kabul.

He served as High Commissioner to Kenya from 1997 to 2001 and the chargé d'affaires to Iran from 1993 to 1997.
