= Chris Whitty =

British physician and epidemiologist (born 1966)

Professor Sir Chris Whitty KCB FRS FRCP FFPH FMedSci HonFREng
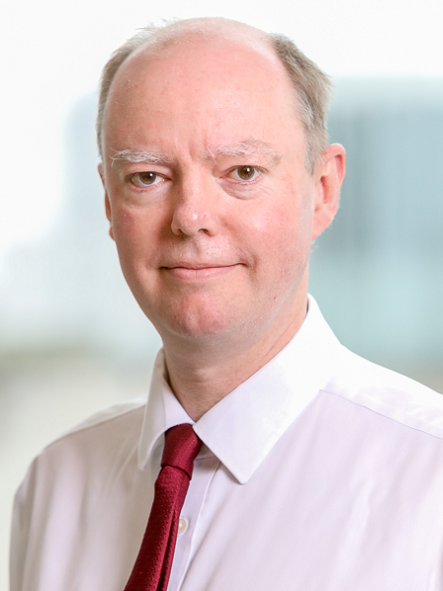
- Whitty in 2020

Chief Medical Officer for England
- Incumbent
- Assumed office 2 October 2019
- Deputy: Sir Jonathan Van-Tam (until 2022); Jenny Harries (2019–2021); Aidan Fowler (since 2020); Jeanelle de Gruchy (since 2021); Thomas Waite (Interim: 2021–2022; since 2022)
- Preceded by: Sally Davies

Government Chief Scientific Adviser
- Interim
- In office 18 September 2017 – 4 April 2018
- Preceded by: Sir Mark Walport
- Succeeded by: Patrick Vallance

Personal details
- Born: Christopher John MacRae Whitty; 21 April 1966 (age 60) Gloucester, England
- Education: Pembroke College, Oxford (BA, DSc); Wolfson College, Oxford (BM BCh); London School of Hygiene and Tropical Medicine (DTM&H, MSc); Northumbria University (LLM); Heriot-Watt University (MBA); The Open University (GrDip)

Sir Christopher John MacRae Whitty KCB FRS (born 21 April 1966) is a British epidemiologist, serving as Chief Medical Officer for England and Chief Medical Adviser to the UK Government since 2019.

Whitty was Chief Scientific Adviser to the Department of Health and Social Care and Head of the National Institute for Health and Care Research from 2016 to 2021. He was also the Acting Government Chief Scientific Adviser from 2017 to 2018. He is emeritus Gresham Professor of Physic.

From March 2020, Whitty played a key role in the response to the COVID-19 pandemic in the UK, alongside Government Chief Scientific Adviser Sir Patrick Vallance. Whitty was appointed Knight Commander of the Order of the Bath (KCB) in the 2022 New Year Honours for services to public health.

== Early life ==
Whitty was born in Gloucester on 21 April 1966, the first of four sons born to Kenneth and Susannah Whitty. His father was a British Council officer, who was posted to various countries including Nigeria, where the family lived in Kaduna, and Malawi (formerly Nyasaland). While Deputy Director of the British Council in Athens, Kenneth Whitty was murdered by militants from the Abu Nidal Organisation, in 1984, when Whitty was 17. His mother was a teacher. His maternal uncle Sir Christopher MacRae was also a diplomat, and his grandmother Grace Summerhayes was a pioneering obstetrician in Africa, who helped set up the first maternity hospital in Ghana in 1928. His paternal grandfather John Whitty DSO MC was killed in World War II and his step grandfather was Sir George Coldstream.

Whitty was sent back to the UK for his schooling, where he attended Windlesham House School in Pulborough, West Sussex, and Malvern College, Worcestershire. He then studied at Pembroke College, Oxford for a BA degree in physiology (1988) and a DSc degree in medical science (2011); Wolfson College, Oxford for BM BCh degrees in medicine (1991), where he was also the founding chair of the National Postgraduate Committee; the London School of Hygiene and Tropical Medicine for a DTM&H (1996) and an MSc degree in epidemiology (1996); Northumbria University for an LLM degree in medical law (2005); Heriot-Watt University for an MBA degree (2010); and The Open University for a GrDip in economics.

== Career ==
Whitty is a practising National Health Service (NHS) consultant physician at University College London Hospitals (UCLH) and the Hospital for Tropical Diseases, and was Gresham Professor of Physic at Gresham College, a post dating back to 1597. Until becoming CMO, he was Professor of Public and International Health at the London School of Hygiene & Tropical Medicine (LSHTM) where he was also Director of the Malaria Centre and he remains a visiting professor there. He worked as a physician and researcher into preventing or treating infectious diseases in the UK, Africa and Asia, especially malaria and other parasitic diseases but also other infections of resource-poor settings. In 2008, the Bill & Melinda Gates Foundation awarded the LSHTM £31 million for malaria research in Africa. At the time, Whitty was the principal investigator for the ACT Consortium, which conducted the research programme.

=== Government roles ===
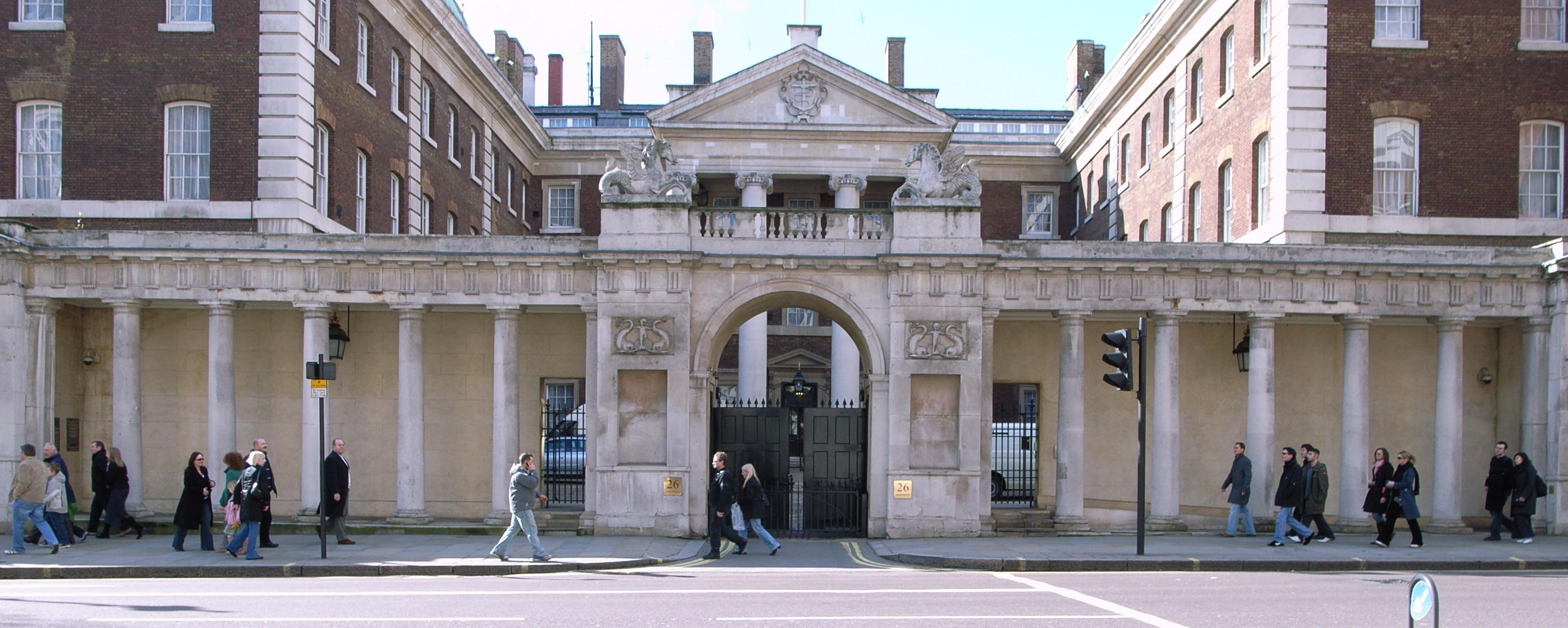
The former Department for International Development (London office) (far right)

From 2009 to 2015, Whitty was Chief Scientific Adviser and director of research for the Department for International Development (DFID). He led the Research and Evidence Division, which worked on health, agriculture, climate change, energy, infrastructure, economic and governance research. During this time, with co-authors Neil Ferguson and Jeremy Farrar, he wrote an article in Nature titled "Infectious disease: Tough choices to reduce Ebola transmission", explaining the UK government's response to Ebola in support of the government of Sierra Leone, which he took a leading role in designing, including the proposal to build and support centres where people could self-isolate voluntarily if they suspected that they could have the disease.

From January 2016 to August 2021, Whitty was Chief Scientific Adviser to the Department of Health and Social Care, responsible for the department's research and development work, including being Head of the National Institute for Health and Care Research (NIHR).

From 2017 to 2018, Whitty was also interim Government Chief Scientific Adviser and head of the science and engineering profession in government. During this period Novichok, the military nerve agent, was responsible for the 2018 Salisbury poisonings, and Whitty chaired the government SAGE (Scientific Advisory Group in Emergencies) and advised COBR for the crisis.

Whitty was appointed Chief Medical Officer (CMO) for England in 2019.

==== COVID-19 pandemic ====
Whitty and two of his deputies, Jenny Harries and Jonathan Van-Tam, took high-profile roles during the COVID-19 pandemic. This included appearing – often with prime minister Boris Johnson and Chief Scientific Adviser Sir Patrick Vallance – in televised news conferences, and giving evidence to parliamentary bodies. From 19 March 2020, Whitty appeared in public information adverts on national television, explaining the government's social-distancing strategy to reduce the spread of the virus during the pandemic.

On 27 March, Whitty was reported to be self-isolating owing to symptoms consistent with COVID-19 after Boris Johnson and Health Secretary Matt Hancock had tested positive for the virus. On 6 April, he had reportedly returned to work having recovered from the symptoms of the virus. In July, he told the Lords Science and Technology Committee that elimination of the disease in the UK would be very difficult, a view that was contested by other scientists including members of the Independent SAGE group.

At a televised briefing on 12 October in which the Prime Minister introduced three tiers of localised restrictions, Whitty said he was "not confident" that the measures in the highest tier would be "enough to get on top of it". Whitty and Vallance presented updated data and forecasts at a televised briefing on 31 October, where the Prime Minister announced stricter measures for the whole of England.

During the outbreak, BBC health editor Hugh Pym called him "the official who will probably have the greatest impact on our everyday lives of any individual policymaker in modern times". The Guardian's sketch writer, John Crace, described him as "the Geek-in-Chief, whom everyone now regards as the country's de facto prime minister". At the same time, he was compared to James Niven, the Scottish physician known for reducing the death rate of influenza during the 1918 flu pandemic in Manchester.

During the Christmas weekend of 2020, Whitty was spotted treating coronavirus patients in London. It was said he "worked the shifts in his capacity as a practising doctor [as] a consultant physician at University College London Hospitals Trust... on the north London hospital's COVID-19 ward over the weekend and bank holiday Monday".

On 26 June 2021, a group of COVID-19 protesters demonstrated outside what appeared to be Whitty's flat in central London. Whitty was subject to other harassment. The Health Secretary, Sajid Javid, said that those responsible "should be ashamed". The Vaccines Minister, Nadhim Zahawi, said they were "thugs" and should face charges.

== Awards and honours ==
Whitty was appointed Companion of the Order of the Bath (CB) in the 2015 New Year Honours for public and voluntary service to Tropical Medicine in the UK and Africa. He is a fellow of the Academy of Medical Sciences and honorary fellow of the Royal Academy of Engineering .

Whitty gave the 2014 Milroy Lecture at the Royal College of Physicians, and the 2017 Harveian Oration at the same institution.

In September 2021, Whitty was awarded an honorary doctorate from the University of Plymouth in recognition of his support for the university's medical science research community. He also holds honorary degrees from the University of York, University of London, University of Manchester and University of Glasgow.

Whitty was appointed Knight Commander of the Order of the Bath (KCB) in the 2022 New Year Honours for services to public health. He was elected a Fellow of the Royal Society in 2023. In 2023, he was awarded the Royal Medal of the Royal Society.

Whitty was appointed Honorary Colonel 144 Medical Squadron Army Reserve on 1 December 2024.

== Selected publications ==
- Whitty, Christopher J. M.; Farrar, Jeremy; Ferguson, Neil; Edmunds, W. John; Piot, Peter; Leach, Melissa; Davies, Sally C. (2014). "Infectious disease: Tough choices to reduce Ebola transmission" (PDF). Nature. 515 (7526): 192–194. Bibcode:2014Natur.515..192W. doi:10.1038/515192a. PMID 25391946. S2CID 4470451.
- Whitty, C. J. (2017). "Harveian Oration 2017: Triumphs and challenges in a world shaped by medicine". Clinical Medicine. 17 (6): 537–544. doi:10.7861/clinmedicine.17-6-537. PMC 6297683. PMID 29196355.
- Lewis, A. C.; Jenkins, D.; Whitty CJM (2023). "Hidden harms of indoor air pollution - five steps to expose them". Nature. 614 (7947): 220–223. Bibcode:2023Natur.614..220L. doi:10.1038/d41586-023-00287-8. PMID 36755167. S2CID 256667056.

Government offices
Preceded by Sir Mark Walport	Government Chief Scientific Adviser; Acting; 2017–2018	Succeeded by Sir Patrick Vallance
Preceded by Dame Sally Davies	Chief Medical Officer for England; 2019–present	Incumbent
