= Ulrika Modéer =

Swedish civil servant and diplomat

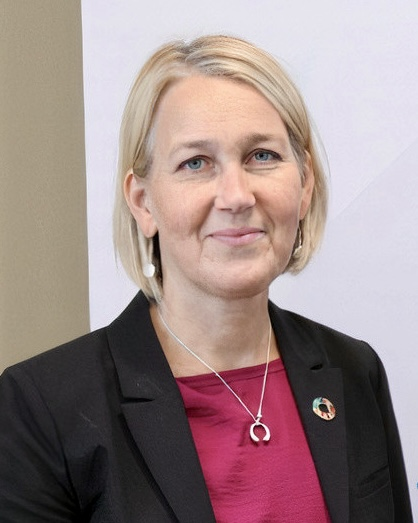
- Modéer in 2019

United Nations Assistant Secretary-General
- Incumbent
- Assumed office 20 August 2018
- Appointed by: António Guterres
- Preceded by: Michael O’Neill; Robert Piper

Personal details
- Born: Eva Maria Ulrika Modéer; 2 October 1969 (age 57) Härryda, Västergötland, Sweden
- Party: Green Party
- Education: University of Gothenburg (BA; PhD)
- Occupation: Civil servant and diplomat

Eva Maria Ulrika Modéer (born 2 October 1969) is a Swedish civil servant who was United Nations Development Programme (UNDP)'s Director of the External Relations and Advocacy Bureau at the assistant secretary-general level from 2018 until 2024. She was a senior official in the system of the United Nations (UN), along with Åsa Regnér.

== Education ==
Modéer graduated from the University of Gothenburg, Sweden, with a B.A. in international relations. She was awarded an honorary doctorate by the University of Göteborg's Faculty of Social Sciences in 2019.

== Diplomatic career ==
Modeer served as a United Nations Volunteer in Guatemala in the late 1990s, when the country had just emerged from Guatemalan Civil War and the signing of the Agreement on Firm and Lasting Peace. Later, she mostly worked with Caritas Sverige, Diakonia, and Sida on international development concerns between 1994 and 2014. She led a team in the Green Party's parliamentary organisation from 2011 to 2014, and from 2014 to 2018, she served as Isabella Lövin's state secretary in the Foreign Ministry under the Löfven administration. Prior to her appointment as Sweden's State Secretary for Climate Change and International Development Cooperation, she played a key role in transforming the nation's approach to international development cooperation in order to facilitate the implementation of the 2030 Agenda.

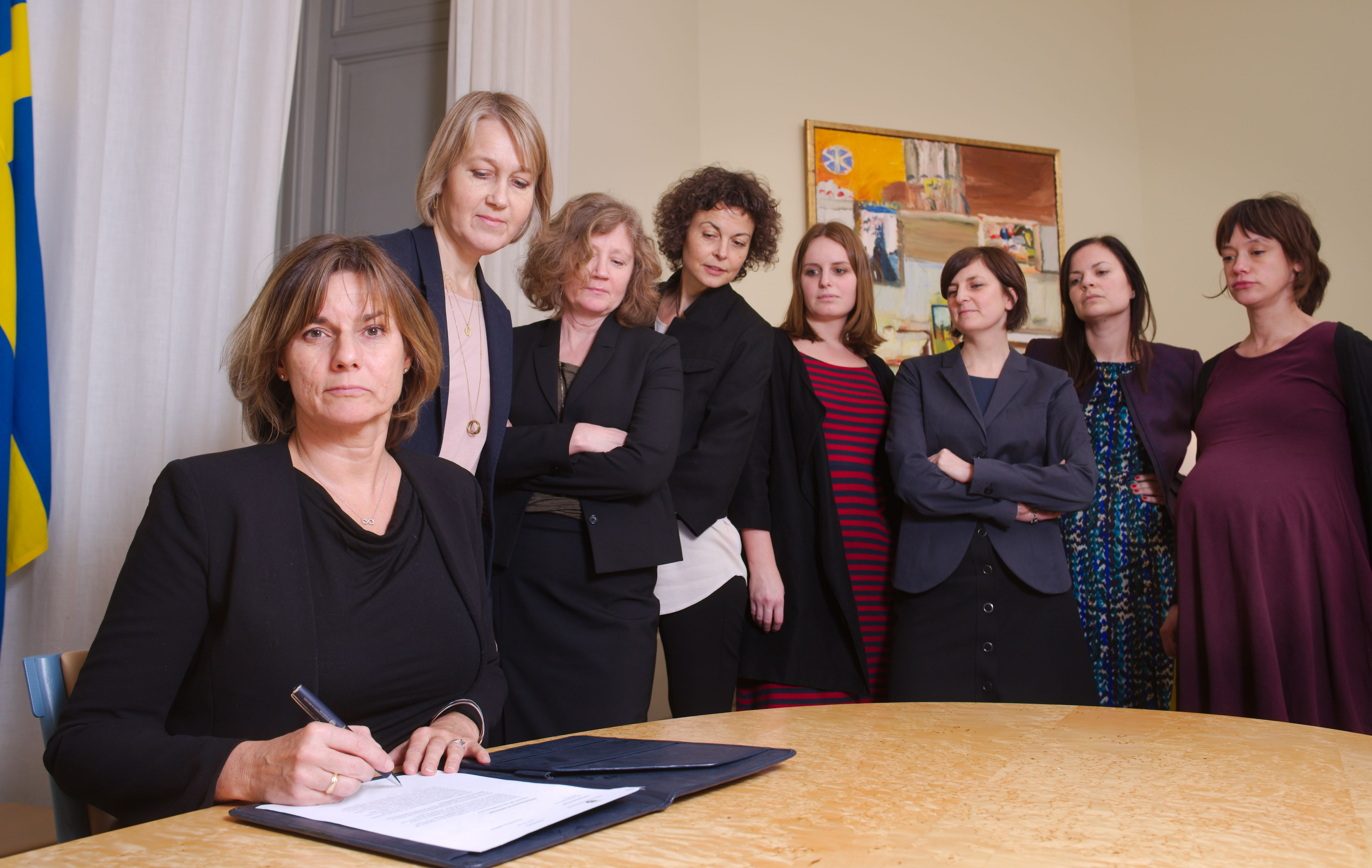
Modéer (2nd, left) together with Isabella Lövin in 2017

Ann-Sofie Nilsson and Frode Mauring signed a US$3.6 million deal on May 18, 2015, in Modéer's presence, to promote the resilience of Palestinians living in Area C and East Jerusalem. The third phase of the Community Resilience and Development Programme (CRDP), which was being carried out by UNDP with funding from the governments of Sweden, Austria, Norway, and the United Kingdom, officially began with the signing ceremony.

On 20 August 2018, Modéer took up her position as the Assistant Administrator of the UNDP and Director of the Bureau of External Relations and Advocacy. As the UNDP works to realise the vision of the Sustainable Development Goals (SDGs), she would lead the organisation in fostering and expanding partnerships with Member States and new and emerging partners. She would also oversee UNDP's lobbying and communications efforts. Michael O'Neill and Robert Piper, who oversaw the bureau during the temporary transition period, are succeeded by her.

Members of the APPG for the UN Global Goals met with Modéer on 13 June 2023, in Parliament. She was traveling to London to attend talks with the FCDO and other organisations. Topics discussed included how the United Kingdom may incorporate the SDGs into its programming, the UNDP's position as a "lead implementer" of programs, and the necessity for nations to maintain their commitment to Voluntary National Review (VNR) procedures.

On 22 August 2023, the Ministry of Development of North Eastern Region and UNDP signed an MoU on technical support for SDG implementation, monitoring and evaluation, capacity building, and governance technologies.

== Personal life ==
Modéer was born on 2 October 1969, is married, and has three kids.
