= Bournemouth Rowing Club =

British rowing club

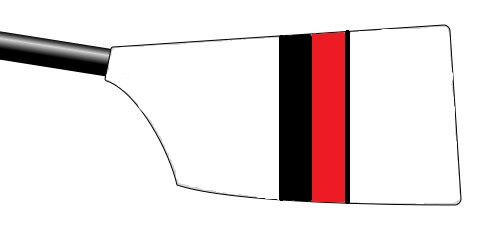
- View of the Bournemouth Regatta 2001 from the pier
- Location: Iford Lane, Bournemouth, Dorset, England
- Founded: 1865
- Affiliations: Hants and Dorset ARA

Bournemouth Rowing Club, formerly known as Westover and Bournemouth Rowing Club, was founded in 1865 and is the oldest club in Bournemouth. It competes in coastal rowing regattas organised by the Hants and Dorset Amateur Rowing Association on the South Coast of England. The club now operates out of a shared boathouse on the river Stour at Iford and is affiliated to British Rowing.

== History ==
In 1865 the first lease was secured, a piece of Foreshore 20 feet square was given by the Clerk to the Bournemouth Improvement Commissioners in 1865. A boathouse was erected and rented at £1 per year, mainly for the storage of pleasure boats. There were fewer than 4000 residents in Bournemouth so a competitive rowing club within the real meaning of the word had not yet started.

At the Annual Dinner of 1870 Cutler, the Captain of the Club referred to having two heavy Punts of unequal size and that racing was hardly practical even with a handicap. Sir Henry Drummond Wolff who was then the Parliamentary candidate for Christchurch and Bournemouth presented the club with a four oared racing galley called the Lothair, which was the title of a novel by the Earl of Beaconsfield. This gift set an example, followed for many years by the Parliamentary candidate, to present a racing galley to the local club. These boats were usually built by Picket or some other expert at Southampton, and though quite light, were designed for sea rowing and so much stouter than 'fine' boats used at river Regattas such as the Henley Royal Regatta.

In 1871 with only one racing galley available, a public subscription was raised to purchase a second, called the Adelaide. Cutler boasted that he had six men in the club that he would not be ashamed to put into a six-oared galley against any club in England. The first recorded season of races took place on 1 May 1871 between the Lothair (crewed by Single men) and the Adelaide (crewed by Married men); the Singles won.

The Premier Rowing Club was formed in 1871 and were owners of the galley Alice. Bournemouth had purchased the Test so the challenge was out - a £20 stake placed for a four-mile race to be rowed before the end of June. Bournemouth placed their faith on their own muscles and their new galley the Alice against the impudent youngsters in the Test. The old Club's colours were Dark Blue and the Premier Club sported Blue and Magenta. The great day was 22 June and it was raining hard with a chop, so the race was postponed by the umpire until the 29th. The race was a walkover for Bournemouth who won in 6 minutes.

In 2010, the club was forced out of its boathouse located next to the Central Pier on the West Beach, after being evicted by Bournemouth Borough Council to make way for redevelopment of the neighbouring Oceanarium.
