= Iain Lindsay =

British diplomat (born 1959)

Iain Lindsay OBE
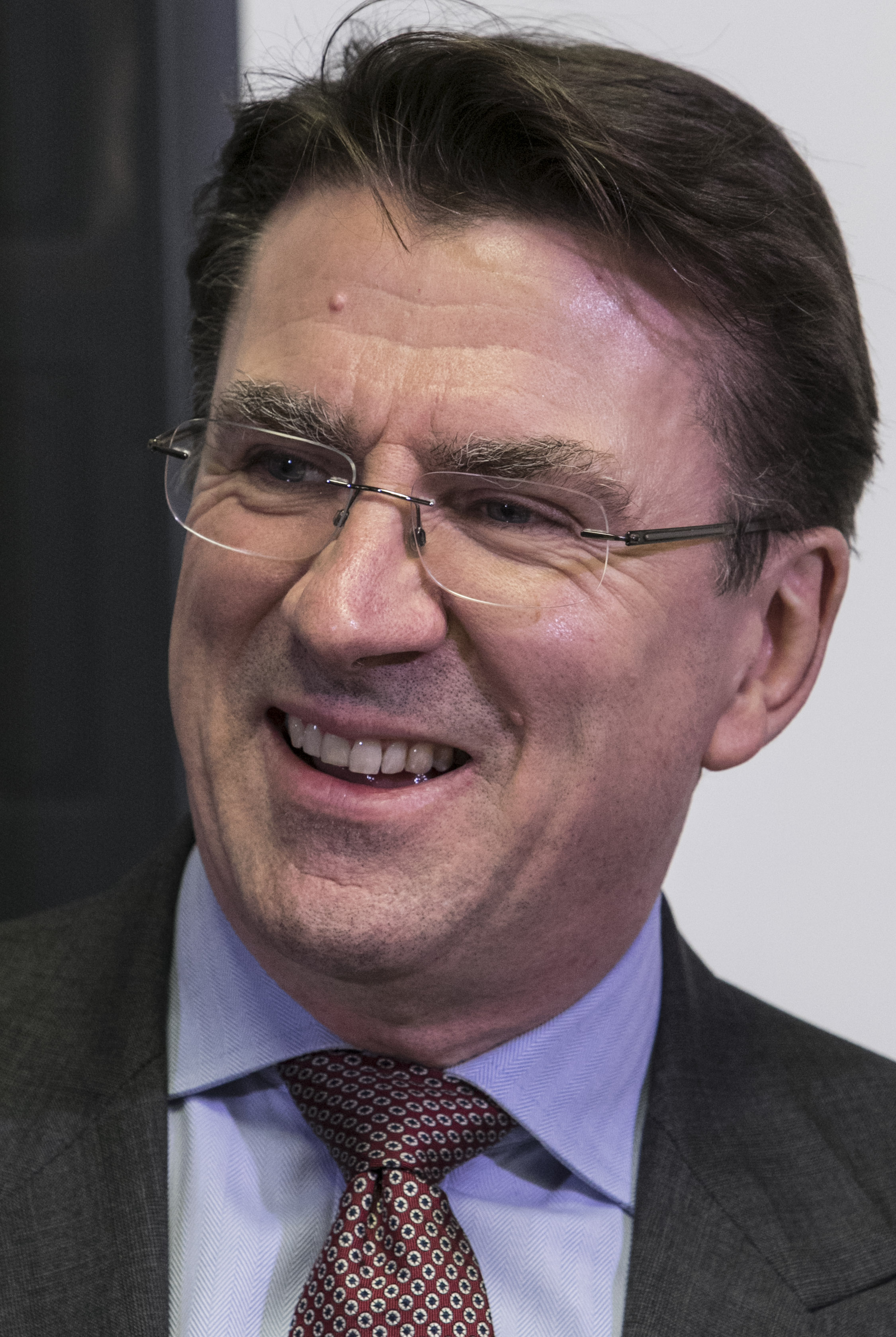

British Ambassador to Hungary
- In office March 2016 – September 2020
- Preceded by: Theresa Bubbear
- Succeeded by: Paul Fox

British Ambassador to Bahrain
- In office 2011–2015
- Preceded by: Jamie Bowden
- Succeeded by: Simon Martin

Personal details
- Born: 9 March 1959 (age 67) Falkirk, Scotland
- Spouse: Bridget Lindsay
- Education: University of Glasgow
- Website: Instagram LinkedIn

Iain Ferrier Lindsay OBE (born 9 March 1959) is a former British diplomat who served as Ambassador of the United Kingdom to Hungary and Ambassador of the United Kingdom to Bahrain. Lindsay now serves as advisor to the Economic Development Board of Bahrain (EDB).

== Career ==
Lindsay joined the Foreign and Commonwealth Office in 1980, spending much of his early career in the Asia-Pacific region. Lindsay served as the British ambassador to Bahrain between 2011 and 2015. He was then British ambassador to Hungary from 2016 to 2020. Lindsay left Hungary in September 2020, and retired from the diplomatic service.

== Honours and awards ==
Ribbon	Name	Year	Notes
	Distinguished Certificate of the Hungarian Defence Forces with Laurel Wreath	2020	Awarded for his efforts done in the interest in developing the cooperation between Hungary and the United Kingdom and support of the Hungarian-British military relations as well as his exemplary activities carried out in the interest of accomplishing common goals.
	Commander's Cross of The Hungarian Order of Merit	2020	Awarded for the development of Hungarian-British relations and his commitment to the Hungarian language and culture, and his role in promoting Scottish cultural heritage in Hungary.
	The Order of Bahrain (Wisam al-Bahrein) 1st Class	2015	Awarded in recognition of his efforts to develop relations between the Kingdom of Bahrain and the United Kingdom.
	Officer of The Most Excellent Order of the British Empire	2002	Awarded for services to operations in Afghanistan.
