= Roger Tomkys =

British diplomat

Sir (William) Roger Tomkys KCMG DL, (born 15 March 1937) is a retired British diplomat, and former Master of Pembroke College, at the University of Cambridge.

He was educated at Bradford Grammar School and graduated from Balliol College, Oxford in 1960.

Tomkys learned Arabic at the Middle East Centre for Arabic Studies in Lebanon, and immediately began his diplomatic career with a posting in Amman, Jordan, where he served from 1962 to 1964. He served as British Ambassador to Bahrain (1981–1984), and Syria (1984–1986), and as High Commissioner in Nairobi from 1990 to 1992.

Tomkys served as Master of Pembroke College from 1992 to 2004; at Cambridge he also served as Chairman of the Centre of International Studies, as well as the Centre for Middle East and Islamic Studies. He also chaired the Arab British Chamber of Commerce (ABCC) from 2004 to 2010.

Tomkys was appointed a Companion of the Order of St Michael and St George (CMG) in the 1984 Birthday Honours and promoted to Knight Commander of the Order (KCMG) in the 1991 New Year Honours.

Tomkys was appointed a Deputy Lieutenant of Cambridgeshire in 1996.

Diplomatic posts
Preceded by David Crawford	Ambassador at Bahrain; 1981-1984	Succeeded by Francis Trew
Preceded by Ivor Lucas	Ambassador to Syria; 1984-1986	Succeeded by Diplomatic relations broken off
Preceded by John Rodney Johnson	High Commissioner to Kenya; 1990-1992	Succeeded by Kieran Prendergast
Academic offices
Preceded by Richard Adrian	Master of Pembroke College, Cambridge; 1992-2004	Succeeded by Richard Dearlove
