= Timothy Torlot =

British diplomat (born 1957)

Tim Torlot
- Tim Torlot in 2023

British Ambassador to Uzbekistan
- In office August 2019 – August 2023
- Monarchs: Elizabeth II; Charles III
- Prime Minister: Boris Johnson; Liz Truss; Rishi Sunak
- Preceded by: Christopher Allan
- Succeeded by: Timothy Smart

British Ambassador to Yemen
- In office July 2007 – 2010
- Monarch: Elizabeth II
- Prime Minister: Gordon Brown; David Cameron
- Preceded by: Michael Gifford
- Succeeded by: Jonathan Wilks

Personal details
- Spouse(s): Bridie Morton; Jennifer Florence Steil
- Children: 2

Timothy Achille Torlot (born 17 September 1957) is a British diplomat who served as British ambassador to Uzbekistan from August 2019 to August 2023.

== Education and career ==
He attended Worcester College, Oxford and gained a BA (Hons) degree in modern languages.

Tim Torlot joined the Foreign and Commonwealth Office in 1981. Following Arabic language training at the School of Oriental and African Studies in London, he was posted as Third Secretary to Muscat in 1984 and to Wellington as Second Secretary in 1987. Returning to the FCO in 1992, he served in Personnel Management Department until 1995 and in South East Asian Department until 1997. He was posted to Santiago from 1997 to 2001. He spent a year in the FCO's Counter Terrorism Department before being appointed Director, Advanced Technologies, UK Trade & Investment. From 2005 to 2006, he was Deputy Head of Mission in Baghdad. Two short assignments at the FCO followed before he was appointed ambassador to the Republic of Yemen in July 2007. On 26 April 2010, Timothy Torlot survived a suicide bomber's attack, responsibility for which was claimed by Al-Qaeda's Yemen wing. He was appointed head of the European External Action Service delegation to Bolivia in 2012. He was appointed British ambassador to Uzbekistan in 2019, and he retired from the Diplomatic Service in 2023.

== Family ==
Timothy Torlot married Bridie Morton in 1986. They have one daughter (Eleanor, born 1990). Their marriage was dissolved in 2011. Tim is now married to author and journalist Jennifer Steil (they married in 2012). They have one daughter (Theadora Celeste Steil Torlot, born 2009).

Diplomatic posts
Preceded by Michael Gifford	British Ambassador to the Republic of Yemen; 2007–2010	Succeeded by Jonathan Wilks
Preceded by Christopher Allan	British Ambassador to the Republic of Uzbekistan; 2019–2023	Succeeded by Timothy Smart
