= Edward Clay =

British diplomat

Sir Edward Clay KCMG (born 21 July 1945) is a retired British diplomat, formerly a High Commissioner and ambassador.

During his time as British High Commissioner in Kenya, Sir Edward earned a reputation for his willingness to speak out against corruption at high levels of the Kenyan government. In a speech made in July 2004 to the British Business Association of Kenya, he famously remarked that the "gluttony" of senior figures in the government of President Mwai Kibaki was causing them to "vomit all over our shoes". His outspoken views earned him widespread popularity among Kenyan citizens but he became persona non grata with the Kenyan government. More surprisingly, his own (British) government also came to see him as problematic, undermining the distribution of British aid funding to Kenya.

He won a scholarship to study at Magdalen College, Oxford.

== Career summary ==
- 1968: joined Foreign Office, London
- 1970: posted to British High Commission, Nairobi
- 1973: appointed Second (later First) Secretary, British Embassy in Sofia
- 1975-1979: Foreign and Commonwealth Office, London
- 1979-1982: First Secretary, British Embassy in Budapest
- 1982-1985: Foreign and Commonwealth Office, London
- 1993-1997: British High Commissioner to Uganda
- 1994-1995: Non-resident British ambassador to Rwanda
- 1994-1996: Non-resident British ambassador to Burundi
- 1997-1999: Director, Public Diplomacy and Public Services, FCO, London
- 1999-2001: British High Commissioner to Cyprus
- 2001-2005: British High Commissioner to Kenya

== Honours ==
- 1994, CMG
- 2005, Honorary Doctorate of Laws from University of Sunderland

== Retirement ==
Sir Edward has been a Trustee of Leonard Cheshire Disability, a disability organisation, and International Alert, a peacebuilding NGO.

== Family ==
Clay married Anne Stroud in 1969, and they had three daughters.

Diplomatic posts
| Preceded by David Madden | British High Commissioners to Cyprus; 1999 to 2001 | Succeeded by Lyn Parker |
| Preceded by Sir Jeffrey James | British High Commissioners to Kenya; 2001 to 2005 | Succeeded by Adam Wood |
