= Christopher MacRae =

British diplomat (born 1937)

Sir Alastair Christopher Donald Summerhayes MacRae KCMG (born 3 May 1937) is a former diplomat for the United Kingdom.

== Early life ==
MacRae was born in May 1937 to Alexander Murray MacRae and Grace Summerhayes. Both parents were doctors, and his mother was a leading obstetrician in the Gold Coast (now mainly Ghana). He has one sister, Susannah, the mother of the current Chief Medical Officer for England, Sir Chris Whitty.

MacRae was educated at Rugby School, before graduating from Lincoln College, Oxford, with a bachelor's degree in English. He then received a Henry Fellowship to study International Relations at Harvard University.

== Career ==
MacRae served in the Royal Navy from 1956 until 1958, joining the Commonwealth Relations Office (CRO) in 1962. From 1963, he served as 3rd Secretary in Dar es Salaam and left in 1965 as 2nd Sectretary. He began studying at the Middle East Centre for Arab Studies (MECAS) in Lebanon in 1965, before serving as 2nd Secretary in Beirut from 1967 until 1968.

He served in the Foreign & Commonwealth Office (FCO) from 1968 until 1970. He then became 1st Secretary and Head of Chancery in Baghdad for a year, and held the same position in Brussels until 1976. While in Brussels, he became attached to the Directorate-General for External Relations in the European Commission on loan from the FCO. He stayed in this position until 1978, when he began taking ambassadorial positions.

MacRae served as British ambassador to Gabon from 1978 until 1980, while also serving for a year as non-resident ambassador to São Tomé and Príncipe. He was then appointed Head of the West Africa Department for the FCO until 1983, while serving as non-resident ambassador to Chad from 1982 for 2 years. After leaving these positions, he served as Political Counsellor and Head of Chancery in Paris for four years, and was then appointed Minister and Head of British Interests Section in Tehran during 1987. While in Tehran, diplomatic relations between Iran and the United Kingdom fell apart, and he was responsible for overseeing the evacuation of British diplomats from the Embassy in Tehran. He returned to London by the end of June that year.

In 1987, MacRae took up a visiting fellow position at the International Institute for Strategic Studies for a year. After leaving the think tank, he was appointed Under Secretary for the Cabinet Office until 1991. He served as High Commissioner for Nigeria and non-resident ambassador to Benin from 1991 until 1994, and then served as High Commissioner for Pakistan for three years with responsibility also for Afghanistan.

MacRae served as Secretary General of the Order of Saint John from 1997 until 2000. He later taught at the American Graduate School in Paris from 2005 until 2008 as an assistant professor in International Relations and Diplomacy. He has remained close with the school, delivering the graduation address in 2014.

== Personal life ==
In 1963, MacRae married Mette Willert, a Danish freelance writer on politics and development issues. They have two daughters, and reside in Provence. His interests include mountain-climbing and long-distance walks.

== Publications ==
- "Forced Marriage as a Foreign Policy Issue in the United Kingdom" in Crimes Against Women (Women's Issues), ed. David Wingeate Pike. Nova Science Publishers. 2011.
- "The Dar Mutiny of 1964", co-authored with Tony Laurence. 2007.

== Honours ==
- Companion of St Michael and St George (1987)
- Knight Commander of St Michael and St George (1993)

Diplomatic posts
Preceded by	Ambassador of the United Kingdom to Gabon; 1978 – 1980	Succeeded by
Preceded by	Ambassador of the United Kingdom to São Tomé and Príncipe; 1979 – 1980	Succeeded by
Preceded by	Ambassador of the United Kingdom to Chad; 1982 – 1983	Succeeded by Michael Francis Daly
Preceded by Brian Barder	Ambassador of the United Kingdom to Benin; 1991 – 1994	Succeeded by Thorold Masefield
Other offices
Preceded by	Secretary General of the Order of Saint John; 1997 – 2000	Succeeded by Anthony Goodenough
