= Nicholas Browne =

British diplomat (1947–2014)

Sir Nicholas Browne KBE CMG

British Ambassador to Denmark
- In office 2003–2006
- Monarch: Elizabeth II
- Preceded by: Philip Astley
- Succeeded by: David Frost

British Ambassador to Iran
- In office 1999–2002
- Monarch: Elizabeth II
- Preceded by: Jeffrey Russell James
- Succeeded by: Richard Dalton

Personal details
- Born: Nicholas Walker Browne; 17 December 1947 West Malling, Kent
- Died: 14 January 2014 (aged 66) Somerset
- Spouse: Diana Aldwinckle (1969–2014; his death)
- Children: 4
- Education: University College, Oxford
- Occupation: Diplomat
- Known for: Ambassador to Iran (1999–2002); Ambassador to Denmark (2003–2006)
- Awards: Companion of the Order of St Michael and St George (1999); Knight Commander of the Order of the British Empire (2002)

Sir Nicholas Walker Browne, KBE, CMG (17 December 1947 – 14 January 2014) was a British diplomat. He served as Ambassador to Iran from 1999 to 2002 and Ambassador to Denmark from 2003 to 2006.

== Early life ==
Browne was born on 17 December 1947 in West Malling, Kent, England. He was the third of four sons born to Gordon Browne, a World War II British Army officer and later a member of the intelligence services. He was educated at Cheltenham College, a public school (i.e. an independent boarding school) in Cheltenham, Gloucestershire. He won an open scholarship to study history at University College, Oxford. He captained the college rugby team, playing as hooker.

== Diplomatic career ==
In 1969, after his graduation from university, Browne joined the Foreign and Commonwealth Office. His first posting to Iran was as Third Secretary in Tehran from 1971 to 1974. From 1976 to 1980, he was on loan to the Cabinet Office.

Following the Iranian Revolution in 1979, he was asked by then foreign secretary David Owen to head an inquiry into why the Foreign and Commonwealth Office had failed to predict the fall of the Shah. In early 1980, he was posted to Southern Rhodesia as First Secretary and Head of Chancery. He attended the festivities that saw the transition of the country from Southern Rhodesia to Zimbabwe on 17/18 April 1980. Between 1981 and 1984, he was Desk Officer at the Maritime, Aviation and Environment Department of the Foreign and Commonwealth Office.

From 1984 to 1989, he served as First Secretary at the British embassy to the European Economic Community. His specialism was the environment. In 1989, he was appointed chargé d'affaires to Iran in Tehran. However, three weeks after he took up the post diplomatic relations were broken off between Britain and Iran due to the Rushdie Affair. He served in London as a Foreign and Commonwealth Office counsellor. From 1990 to 1994, he was posted to the United States; first to Washington, D.C. as press and public affairs counselor and then to New York City as British information head.

Between 1994 and 1997, he was Head of Middle Eastern Department, Foreign and Commonwealth Office, in London. In 1997, he was posted to Iran as chargé d'affaires. In the 1999 Queen's Birthday Honours, he was appointed Companion of the Order of St Michael and St George (CMG) in recognition of his work in Iran.

He was promoted to His Majesty's Ambassador to the Islamic Republic of Iran in 1999. He oversaw the visit to Tehran in late September 2001 by then foreign minister Jack Straw, the first visit to the country by a senior British government minister since the 1979 Revolution. He left Iran in 2002 and was appointed Knight Commander of the Order of the British Empire (KBE) in that year's Queen's Birthday Honours in recognition of his work as ambassador. He served as His Majesty's Ambassador to the Kingdom of Denmark from 2003 to 2006.

== Later life ==
Browne was diagnosed with Parkinson's disease in 2003. He retired in 2006 due to the illness. He died on 13 January 2014 in Somerset, aged 66.

== Personal life ==
Browne married Diana Aldwinckle in 1969. They had met while fellow undergraduates at the University of Oxford. Together they had two sons, Jeremy and Arthur, and two daughters, Jasmine and Abigail. He was an avid rock fan with a large collection of vinyls. In 1980, he had attended one of the last concerts by Bob Marley at the Rufaro Stadium, Salisbury, Zimbabwe.

Diplomatic posts
Preceded by Jeffrey Russell James	British Ambassador to Iran; 1999–2002	Succeeded by Richard Dalton
Preceded by Philip Astley	British Ambassador to Denmark; 2003–2006	Succeeded by David Frost
