= Victor Henderson =

British diplomat

Victor Joseph Henderson CMG (born 10 January 1941) is a former British diplomat.

He was educated at King's College London (BA Spanish, 1961) and served as British Ambassador to Yemen from 1997 to 2001.

== Honours ==
- Companion of the Order of St Michael and St George (CMG) - 2000

Diplomatic posts
Preceded by Douglas Scrafton	British Ambassador to Yemen; 1997–2001	Succeeded by Frances Guy
