= Henry Drummond Wolff =

English diplomat and politician (1830–1908)

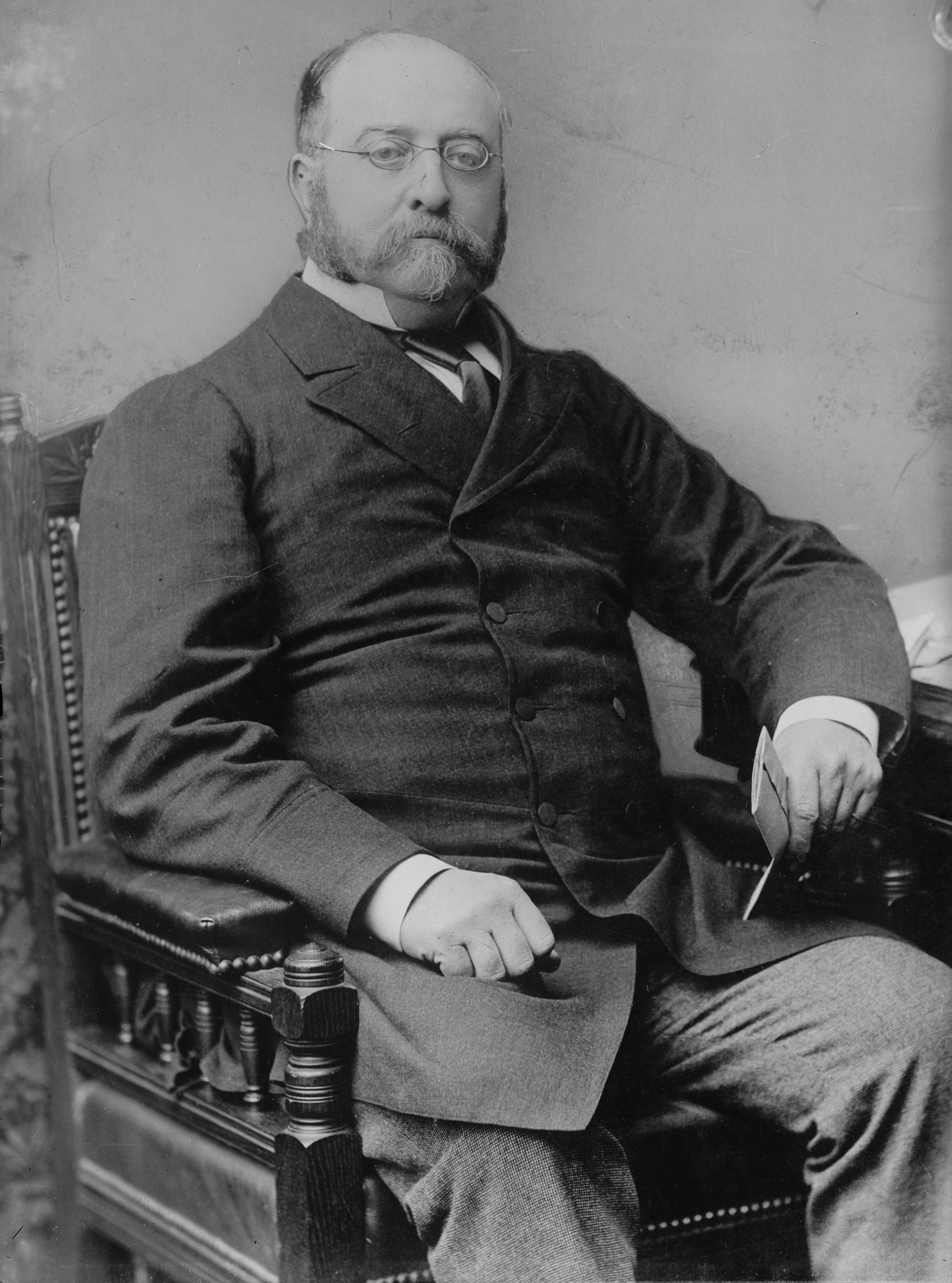
Sir Henry Drummond Wolff

Sir Henry Drummond Charles Wolff, GCB, GCMG (12 October 1830 – 11 October 1908), known as Henry Drummond Wolff, was an English diplomat and Conservative Party politician, who started as a clerk in the Foreign Office.

== Background ==
Wolff was born in Malta, the son of Joseph Wolff and Lady Georgiana Mary Walpole, daughter of Horatio Walpole, 2nd Earl of Orford. His father was a missionary who had converted from Judaism to Catholicism and then Anglicanism, and his mother was the niece of Prime Minister Robert Walpole.

Wolff was educated at Rugby School.

== Political and diplomatic career ==
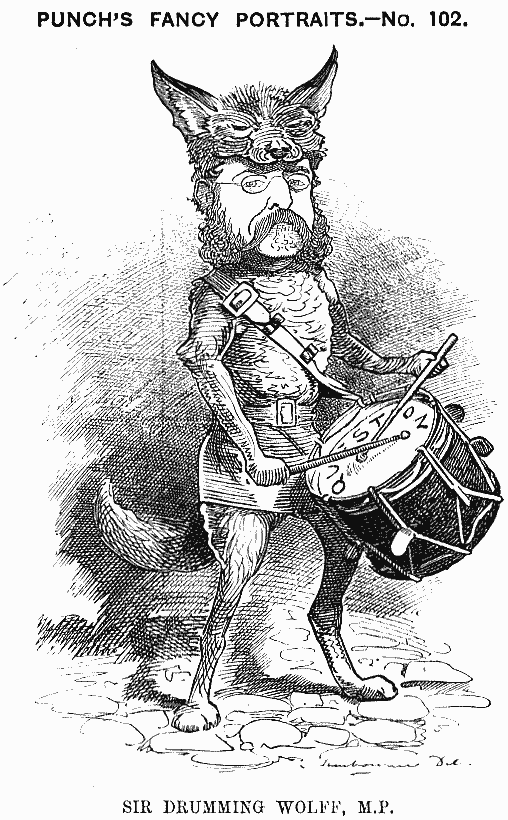
Caricature from Punch, 1882

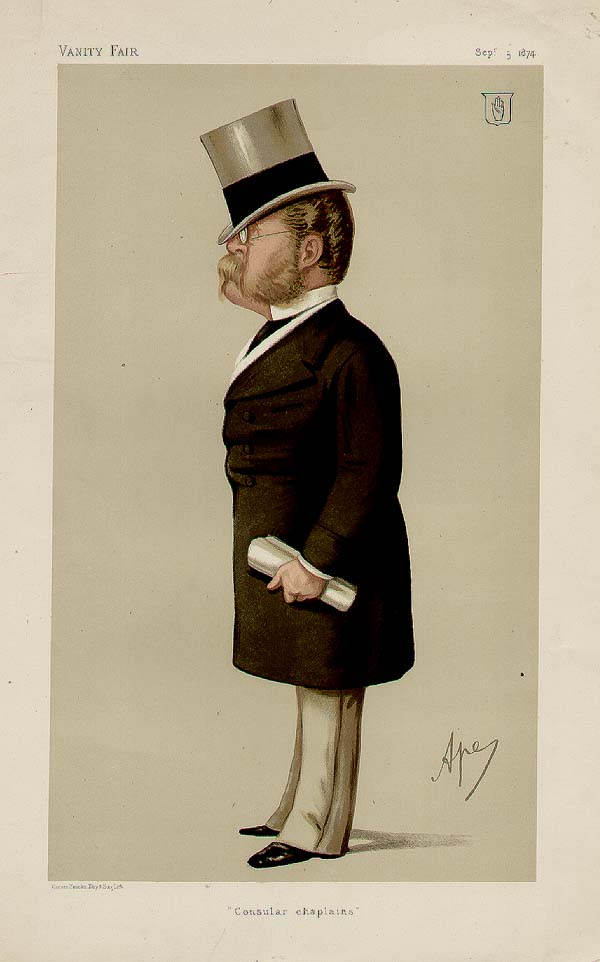
Caricature by Ape published in Vanity Fair in 1874.

Wolff sat in parliament for Christchurch from 1874 to 1880 and for Portsmouth from 1880 to 1885. While MP for Christchurch he lived in Boscombe, where he developed the Boscombe Spa estate, and he played an active role in the public life of Bournemouth. In 1870 he presented Bournemouth Rowing Club with a four-oared racing boat. He was one of the group known as the Fourth Party.

In 1885 he went on a special mission to Constantinople and Egypt in connection with the Eastern Question, and as a result various awkward difficulties, hinging on the Sultan's suzerainty, were addressed. Wolff negotiated a settlement whereby Britain and Turkey would each appoint a commissioner to Egypt to help the khedive's government conduct reforms of the army and the government. Wolff then assumed the role of British high commissioner in Egypt from 1885 to 1887. He was appointed Envoy Extraordinary and Minister Plenipotentiary to Teheran in 1888, a post he held until 1891, and was then Ambassador to Madrid from 1892 to 1900. While serving in Spain, he would assist Ambassador Taylor, of the United States, in out maneuvering Foreign Minister O'Donnell.

Wolff was a notable raconteur and aided the Conservative Party by helping to found the Primrose League. He was appointed a Knight Commander of the Order of St Michael and St George (KCMG) in 1862 for various services abroad. He was advanced to Knight Grand Cross of the Order of St Michael and St George (GCMG) in 1878 and made a Knight Grand Cross of the Order of the Bath (GCB) in 1889.

As the British Minister of Iran, he assisted Antoine Kitabgi Khan, the Director General of Persian Customs, in the negotiations that led Nasir al-Din Shah to grant a concession of full monopoly over Iran's tobacco industry to Major G. F. Talbot (20 March 1890). This concession resulted in the Tobacco Protest of 1891 and is generally considered to mark the beginning of social unrest and clear Islamic clerical influence leading up to the Persian Constitutional Revolution in 1905.

In 1901, as Kitabgi Khan was looking in Europe for capitalists who might be interested in investing in oil prospection in Iran, Wolff introduced him to Englishman William Knox D'Arcy, who had made a fortune in gold mines in Australia. On 28 May 1901, Mozaffar ad-Din Shah granted D'Arcy the first oil concession in Iran that later gave birth to British Petroleum. The deed of concession stipulated that Wolff would have 10% of the profits resulting from the venture.

== Personal life ==
Wolff's only daughter, Lucas Cleeve, was a novelist. Her son Algernon Kingscote was a notable tennis player. Wolff's grandson Henry Maxence Cavendish Drummond Wolff was briefly the Conservative Member of Parliament for Basingstoke.

He died at Brighton, one day before his 78th birthday.

== In popular culture ==
Wolff was portrayed by Charles Lloyd-Pack in the 1974 Thames TV mini-series Jennie: Lady Randolph Churchill.

== Notes ==
Parliament of the United Kingdom
Preceded by Edmund Haviland-Burke	Member of Parliament for Christchurch; 1874–1880	Succeeded by Horace Davey
Preceded by Thomas Charles Bruce; Sir James Dalrymple-Horn-Elphinstone, Bt	Member of Parliament for Portsmouth; 1880–1885; With: Thomas Charles Bruce	Succeeded by Sir William Crossman; Philip Vanderbyl
Diplomatic posts
Preceded by –	High Commissioner to Egypt; 1885–1887	Succeeded by –
Preceded by Ronald Ferguson Thomson	Envoy Extraordinary and Minister Plenipotentiary; 1888–1891	Succeeded by Sir Frank Lascelles
Preceded by Sir Clare Ford	Ambassador to Spain; 1892–1900	Succeeded by Sir Mortimer Durand
