= List of high commissioners of the United Kingdom to Kenya =

The high commissioner of the United Kingdom to Kenya is the United Kingdom's foremost diplomatic representative in the Republic of Kenya, and in charge of the UK's diplomatic mission in Kenya.

As fellow members of the Commonwealth of Nations, the United Kingdom and Kenya conduct their diplomatic relations at governmental level, rather than between heads of state. Therefore, the countries exchange high commissioners rather than ambassadors.

- 1963–1964: Sir Geoffrey de Freitas
- 1964–1965: Malcolm MacDonald
- 1966–1968: Sir Edward Peck
- 1968–1972: Sir Eric Norris
- 1972–1975: Sir Antony Duff
- 1975–1979: Sir Stanley Fingland
- 1979–1982: Sir John Williams
- 1982–1986: Sir Leonard Allinson
- 1986–1990: Sir John Johnson
- 1990–1992: Sir Roger Tomkys
- 1992–1995: Sir Kieran Prendergast
- 1995–1997: Simon Hemans
- 1997–2001: Sir Jeffrey James
- 2001–2005: Sir Edward Clay
- 2005–2008: Adam Wood
- 2008–2011: Robert Macaire
- 2011–2012: Peter Tibber (interim)
- 2012–2015: Christian Turner
- 2015–2019: Nic Hailey
- 2019–2023: Jane Marriott
- 2023–2025: Neil Wigan
- 2026-present: Matt Baugh
