= Edmund Fitton-Brown =

British diplomat

Edmund Walter Fitton-Brown (born 5 October 1962) is a former British diplomat who is a senior fellow at Foundation for Defense of Democracies focused on Arabian peninsula issues, global terrorism, and extremist groups like ISIS, al-Qaeda, and the Muslim Brotherhood.

He is a frequent commentator for major outlets like BBC News and writes broadly, appearing in specialist and mainstream publications, including the Washington Examiner, The Telegraph, the New York Post, The Jerusalem Post, and The National Interest.

Edmund joined the UK foreign service in 1984 and served in Finland, Egypt, Kuwait, Saudi Arabia, Italy, and the United Arab Emirates. From February 2015 to February 2017, he served as the British Ambassador of the United Kingdom to Yemen. In 2018, he joined the United Nations for five years, serving as Coordinator of the United Nations Analytical Support and Sanctions Monitoring Team concerning the Islamic State in Iraq and the Levant (Da’esh), Al-Qaida, the Taliban, and associated individuals, groups, undertakings, and entities.

Fitton-Brown read history at Corpus Christi College, Cambridge; after graduating, he joined Her Majesty's Diplomatic Service in 1984. Between 1991 and 2003, he served as First Secretary before becoming Counsellor in Cairo, Rome and others.

In March 2026 Fitton-Brown made strong criticisms of the British Government's foreign policy: he spoke of what he said was the growing problem of "Islamist entryism not just in the Foreign Office but also throughout the Civil Service and a range of other professions... Allies [are] portrayed as the problem, adversaries become misunderstood actors with legitimate grievances."

Diplomatic posts
Preceded by Jane Marriott	British Ambassador to Yemen; 2015–2017	Succeeded by Simon Shercliff
