= William Cole (scholar) =

English classical scholar

William Cole (8 December 1753 – 25 September 1806) was an English classical scholar.

== Life ==
Cole was born on 8 December 1753 at Mersham in Kent, and received in early life great assistance from a friend of his mother, John Chapman, archdeacon of Sudbury (1704–1784). Chapman sent him first to Ashford Grammar School (now The Norton Knatchbull School), and afterwards to a private seminary at Bierton, near Aylesbury, Buckinghamshire. In 1766 he was admitted at Eton College on the foundation, and in 1773 was made scholar of King's College, Cambridge, and fellow in 1776, proceeding B.A. in 1778, and M.A. in 1781.

In 1777 he returned to Eton as a master, but, having ruptured a blood-vessel while an undergraduate, found himself not strong enough for the post, and resigned it in 1780 on being appointed tutor to George, Marquess of Blandford, and Lord Henry Spencer, the sons of the Duke of Marlborough, to whom he became chaplain.

In 1781 he was inducted to the first portion of the rectory of Waddesdon, Buckinghamshire, on the presentation of the Duke of Marlborough, but resigned it in 1788, on being collated to the rectory of Mersham, Kent, by the Archbishop of Canterbury. In 1792 he was installed prebendary of Westminster, and in 1795 received the degree of D.D. by the archbishop's diploma at the archiepiscopal visitation at Canterbury. In 1796 he was presented to the vicarage of Shoreham, Kent, by the dean and chapter of Westminster. In 1795 he married Mary, the second daughter of Sir William Blackstone, but left no issue.

He died on 24 September 1806, and was buried in the north aisle of Westminster Abbey.

== Works ==
To the Marquis of Blandford he dedicated his Oratio de Ridiculo, to which the first of Sir William Browne's medals was awarded; he printed it along with some Latin verse 1780. He was also the author of a Latin explanation prefixed to the second volume of the Marlborough Gems privately printed under the auspices of George, duke of Marlborough, and of several sermons.
