= Ronald Ferguson Thomson =

British diplomat

Sir Ronald Thomson GCMG CB FRGS

British Ambassador to Persia|British Ambassador to Iran|British Ambassador to Persia
- In office 1908–1912
- Preceded by: William Taylour Thomson
- Succeeded by: Sir Henry Drummond Wolff

Personal details
- Born: 26 June 1830
- Died: 15 November 1888 (aged 58)
- Occupation: Diplomat

Sir Ronald Ferguson Thomson GCMG CB FRGS (26 June 1830 – 15 November 1888) was a British diplomat.

Thomson spent his entire professional life working for the British Foreign Office in Tehran. He was appointed Secretary of Legation (third class) on 7 September 1848 and was promoted on 5 January 1852 to attaché. In 1879 he succeeded his elder brother William Taylour Thomson in the office of Envoy Extraordinary and Ministers Plenipotentiary to Persia. During his tenure, the Sheikh Ubeydullah uprising took place. In June 1879 he was invested as a Knight Commander of the Order of St Michael and St George, later being promoted to Knight Grand Cross. Ronald Thomson retired in 1887. He was a Fellow of the Royal Geographical Society and was buried in the Crystal Palace District Cemetery.
