= Simon Shercliff =

British diplomat

Simon Shercliff CMG OBE
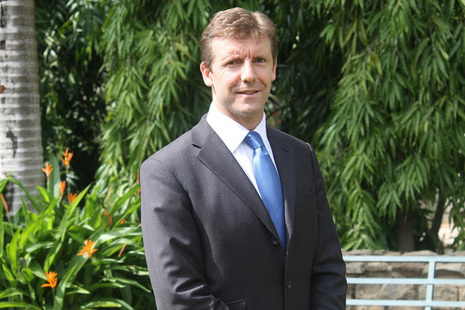

British Ambassador to Iran
- In office August 2021 – October 2024
- Monarchs: Elizabeth II; Charles III
- Prime Minister: Boris Johnson; Liz Truss; Rishi Sunak; Keir Starmer
- Preceded by: Robert Macaire
- Succeeded by: Hugo Shorter

Personal details
- Education: University of Cambridge
- Occupation: Diplomat

Simon Shercliff (born 23 December 1972) is a British diplomat, and was ambassador to Iran from 2021 to 2024

== Education and career ==
Shercliff was educated at Wells Cathedral School. He graduated from St Catharine's College, Cambridge in 1995, with a degree in Earth Sciences.

Shercliff took up his first posting with the (then) Foreign and Commonwealth Office in 2000, as a political officer in the embassy in Tehran, Iran, in 2000. He was subsequently deployed to Baghdad, Iraq as Private Secretary to Jeremy Greenstock, who was the UK's special representative to Iraq. Later postings took him to Washington, D.C., Kabul, Abuja and then to Yemen, as British ambassador. He returned to London as Director of National Security for the Foreign, Commonwealth and Development Office in February 2018.

In August 2021, he became the British ambassador to Iran. Shercliff served until 2024, when he was replaced by Hugo Shorter.

== Honours ==
In December 2004, Shercliff was awarded an OBE in the Civilian Honours list "in recognition of services to the reconstruction of Iraq and towards its transition to democracy".

In the 2021 New Year Honours Shercliff was made a Companion of the Order of St Michael and St George (CMG) "for services to British foreign policy and National Security."

== Family ==
He is married to Emma Louise Shercliff, and they have two children.

Diplomatic posts
Preceded by Edmund Fitton-Brown	British Ambassador to Yemen; 2017–2018	Succeeded by Michael Aron
Preceded by Robert Macaire	British Ambassador to Iran; 2021–2024	Succeeded by Hugo Shorter
