= Edward F. Henderson =

British diplomat (1917–1995)

Edward Firth Henderson CMG (12 December 1917 – 13 April 1995) was a British diplomat who was a prominent figure in the Persian Gulf region, where he spent most of his life furthering Britain's relations with the United Arab Emirates, Qatar, Oman and Bahrain.

Henderson was educated at Clifton College and Brasenose College, Oxford. After serving in the Middle East during World War II, "a switch from the petroleum industry to the diplomatic service in 1956 took him as British consul to Jerusalem"; he was subsequently UK Political Officer in Abu Dhabi and (1971–1973) British Ambassador to Qatar. In 1982 he co-founded the American Educational Trust, best known for publishing the Washington Report on Middle East Affairs.

He was a friend of the explorer Wilfred Thesiger, whom he first met during his service in Syria.

== Books ==
- This Strange Eventful History (1988) (memoirs)

Diplomatic posts
New title	British Ambassador to Qatar; 1971–1973	Succeeded by Douglas Gordon
