= Frances Guy =

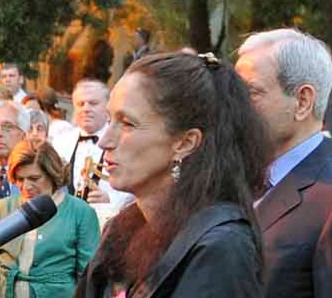
- speaking at the Queen's Birthday party in Beirut, 10 June 2008
- Born: Frances Mary Guy; 1 February 1959 (age 67)
- Education: George Watson's College, Aberdeen University, Johns Hopkins University and Carleton University
- Occupations: ambassador and CEO
- Employer(s): Foreign and Commonwealth Office, Scotland's International Development Alliance

Frances Mary Guy (born 1 February 1959) is a British former ambassador and UN Women's representative who became the chief executive of Scotland's International Development Alliance.

== Early life ==
Guy was born on 1 February 1959 to David Guy and Elizabeth Guy (née Hendry). She was educated at George Watson's College, Edinburgh. She studied international relations at Aberdeen University, graduating with an undergraduate Master of Arts (MA Hons) degree. She then studied at the Bologna Center of Johns Hopkins University, graduating with a diploma, and Carleton University, Ottawa, graduating with a postgraduate Master of Arts degree in international relations.

== Career ==
Guy joined the Foreign and Commonwealth Office (FCO) in 1985 and served at Khartoum, Bangkok and Addis Ababa as well as at the FCO. She was Ambassador to Yemen 2001–04, head of the FCO's Engaging the Islamic World group 2004–06, and Ambassador to Lebanon 2006–11. She was adviser on the Middle East to the Foreign Secretary 2011–12, including a role as the Foreign Secretary's envoy to the Syrian opposition. From May 2012 to December 2014 she was the representative of UN Women in Iraq. She then worked as head of Middle East region at Christian Aid, based in London. Her current role is chief executive of Scotland's International Development Alliance.

Guy is a Visiting Senior Research Fellow in the Middle East & Mediterranean Studies Programme at King's College London. She is a former president of the British Society of Middle East Studies (BRISMES) and a trustee of the Alexandria Trust for education in the Arab region.

Diplomatic posts
Preceded by Victor Henderson	Ambassador to the Republic of Yemen; 2001–2004	Succeeded by Michael Gifford
Preceded by James Watt	Ambassador to the Republic of Lebanon; 2006–2011	Succeeded by Thomas Fletcher
