= Jane Marriott =

British diplomat

Her Excellency Jane Marriott CMG OBE
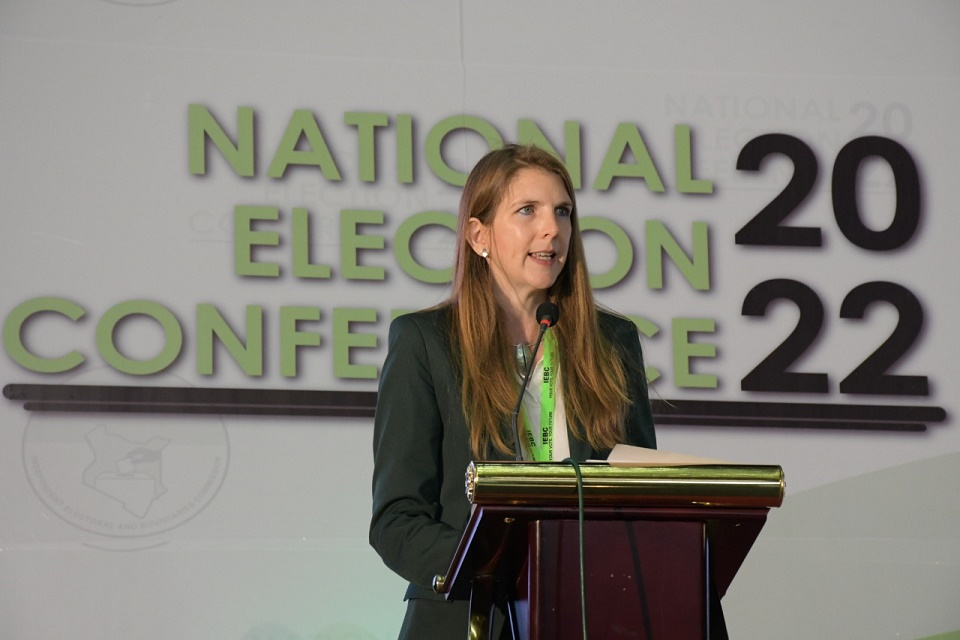
- Jane Marriott speaking at the Kenya National Elections Conference in 2022

British High Commissioner to Pakistan
- Incumbent
- Assumed office July 2023

British High Commissioner to Kenya
- In office 2019–2023
- Preceded by: Nic Hailey

British Ambassador to Yemen
- In office 2013–2015
- Preceded by: Nicholas Hopton
- Succeeded by: Edmund Fitton-Brown

Personal details
- Born: 1976 (age 49–50) Doncaster, England
- Education: Durham University; Darwin College, Cambridge
- Profession: Diplomat
- Awards: Officer of the Order of the British Empire (OBE), 2004; Companion of the Order of St Michael and St George (CMG), 2023

Jane Marriott CMG OBE (born 1976) is a British diplomat currently serving as the British High Commissioner to Pakistan, a position she assumed in 2023. She previously served as the British High Commissioner to Kenya from 2019 to 2023.

Marriott graduated from Durham University in 1997 with a first-class degree in History and later earned an MPhil in International Relations from Darwin College, Cambridge.

== Career ==
From 2013 to 2015, Marriott served as the British Ambassador to Yemen. She previously worked as an adviser to Richard Holbrooke, the United States Special Envoy for Afghanistan and Pakistan.

On 13 June 2019, Marriott was appointed British High Commissioner to Kenya, succeeding Nic Hailey, becoming the first woman to hold the position. She assumed office in the summer of 2019. In 2023, she was appointed as the British High Commissioner to Pakistan.

== Honours ==
Marriott was appointed Officer of the Order of the British Empire (OBE) in 2004 and was made a Companion of the Order of St Michael and St George (CMG) in the 2023 Birthday Honours for services to British foreign policy.

== Controversies ==
In 2024, during the Asma Jahangir Conference, Marriott raised concerns about Pakistan’s electoral process, stating that not all parties were allowed to contest freely and that legal measures were used to restrict certain political leaders and party symbols. Her remarks prompted a strong response from the Supreme Court of Pakistan, which defended its actions, asserting that election laws requiring intra-party elections were not followed by a specific party, leading to the removal of its electoral symbol. The court also emphasized that general elections were conducted within the legally mandated timeframe. The Supreme Court’s registrar addressed Marriott’s comments in a formal letter, clarifying the legal proceedings and affirming that elections were held throughout Pakistan on 8 February 2024.

Diplomatic posts
Preceded by Nicholas Hopton	British Ambassador to Yemen; 2013–2015	Succeeded by Edmund Fitton-Brown
Preceded by Nic Hailey	British High Commissioner to Kenya; 2019–2023	Succeeded by
Preceded by	British High Commissioner to Pakistan; 2023–present	Succeeded by
