= Andrew Killgore =

American diplomat

Andrew Ivy Killgore (November 7, 1919 – December 20, 2016) was an American diplomat and a U.S. Foreign Service Officer. He was ambassador of the United States to Qatar from 1977 until his retirement from the U.S. Foreign Service in 1980.

== Early life ==
Killgore was born November 7, 1919, in Greensboro, Alabama. He received a B.S. from Livingston College in 1943 and an LL.B. from the University of Alabama in 1949. He served in the U.S. Navy from 1943 to 1946.

== Diplomatic career ==
Killgore served as a selector-analyst for the U.S. Displaced Persons Commission in 1949 and 1950 and as a displaced populations officer in Frankfort in 1950 and 1951. From 1951 to 1953, he was visa officer in London.

From 1953 to 1955, he was an evaluator at the State Department. In 1955–56, Killgore took Arab language training at the Foreign Service Institute, and in 1956 and 1957, he served as political officer in Beirut. From 1957 to 1959, he was political officer in Jerusalem, and from 1959 to 1961, he was political officer in Amman. In 1961 and 1962, Killgore was an international relations officer at the State Department. From 1962 to 1965, he was officer-in-charge of Iraq-Jordan affairs. From 1965 to 1967, he was detailed as a public affairs officer to USIA in Baghdad. Killgore was political officer in Dacca from 1967 to 1970 and political-economic officer for the Arab North Directorate, Jordan Affairs, at the State Department from 1970 to 1972. From 1972 to 1974, he was counselor for political affairs in Tehran. In 1974 he was principal officer in Manama, and from 1974 to 1976, he was deputy chief of mission in Wellington. He died in December 2016 at the age of 97 in a Washington, D.C., hospice.
