= Jamie Bowden (diplomat) =

British diplomat

Jamie Bowden CMG OBE MVO

HM Ambassador to Chile
- In office 2018–2020

Deputy Private Secretary to the Prince of Wales and Duchess of Cornwall
- In office 2014–2017

HM Ambassador to Oman
- In office 2011–2014

HM Ambassador to Bahrain
- In office 2006–2011

Personal details
- Born: James Nicholas Geoffrey Bowden; 27 May 1960 (age 65)

James Nicholas Geoffrey Bowden (born 27 May 1960) is a retired British diplomat who was ambassador to Chile from 2018 to 2020.

== Career ==
Bowden was educated at Eton, then served in the Royal Green Jackets 1980–86. He then joined the diplomatic service and served at Aden, Khartoum, Washington, Riyadh and at the Foreign and Commonwealth Office. He was deputy head of mission in Kabul in 2002, Kuwait 2003–04, Baghdad 2004–05, and Kuwait again 2005–06. He was ambassador to the Kingdom of Bahrain 2006–11 and to the Sultanate of Oman 2011–14. He was seconded as deputy private secretary to the Prince of Wales 2014–17. He took up his post as ambassador to the Republic of Chile in June 2018.

== Honours ==
Bowden was appointed OBE in 2002 "in recognition of services in support of operations in Afghanistan", CMG in the 2012 New Year Honours, and MVO in the 2017 New Year Honours.

== Archive Material ==
Transcript of interview for the British Diplomatic Oral History Programme.

Diplomatic posts
Preceded by Robin Lamb	British Ambassador to Bahrain; 2006–2011	Succeeded by Iain Lindsay
Preceded by Noel Guckian	British Ambassador to Oman; 2011–2014	Succeeded by Jonathan Wilks
Preceded by Fiona Clouder	British Ambassador to Chile; 2018–2020	Succeeded by Louise De Sousa
