= Al Saeed University =

Private university in Yemen

Al Saeed University is a private university located in Taiz, Yemen. It was established in 2012 with the approval of the Ministry of Higher Education and Scientific Research. The university is a member of the Union of Arab Universities and maintains partnership agreements with several institutions across the Arab world.

The university includes integrated engineering and medical facilities and consists of five colleges and sixteen academic programs accredited according to national academic standards. It also operates a Quality Assurance Center, a Center for Research and Strategic Studies, and a Community Service Center.

Al Saeed University is affiliated with the Ha'il Saeed An'am Group. The university publishes two scientific journals that have obtained an Arab Impact Factor and reference citations. Dr. Iqbal Duqan, head of the Medical Laboratory Sciences Department, is noted for her work in biological chemistry.
