= List of diplomats of the United Kingdom to Qatar =

The ambassador of the United Kingdom to Qatar is the United Kingdom's foremost diplomatic representative in the State of Qatar, and head of the UK's diplomatic mission in Doha.

== Heads of mission ==
Ambassadors extraordinary and plenipotentiary

- 1971–1973: Edward Henderson
- 1973–1974: Douglas Gordon
- 1974–1978: David Crawford
- 1978–1981: Colin Brant
- 1981–1984: Stephen Day
- 1984–1987: Julian Walker
- 1987–1990: Patrick Nixon
- 1990–1993: Sir Graham Boyce
- 1993–1997: Patrick Wogan
- 1997–2002: David Wright
- 2002–2005: David MacLennan
- 2005–2007: Simon Collis

Chargé d'affaires

- 2007–2008: Roderick Drummond

Ambassadors

- 2008–2012: John Hawkins
- 2012–2013: Michael O'Neill
- 2013–2015: Nicholas Hopton
- 2015–2020: Ajay Sharma
- 2020–2024: Jonathan Wilks
- 2024–present: Neerav Patel
