= William Taylour Thomson =

19th-century British military officer and diplomat (1813–1883)

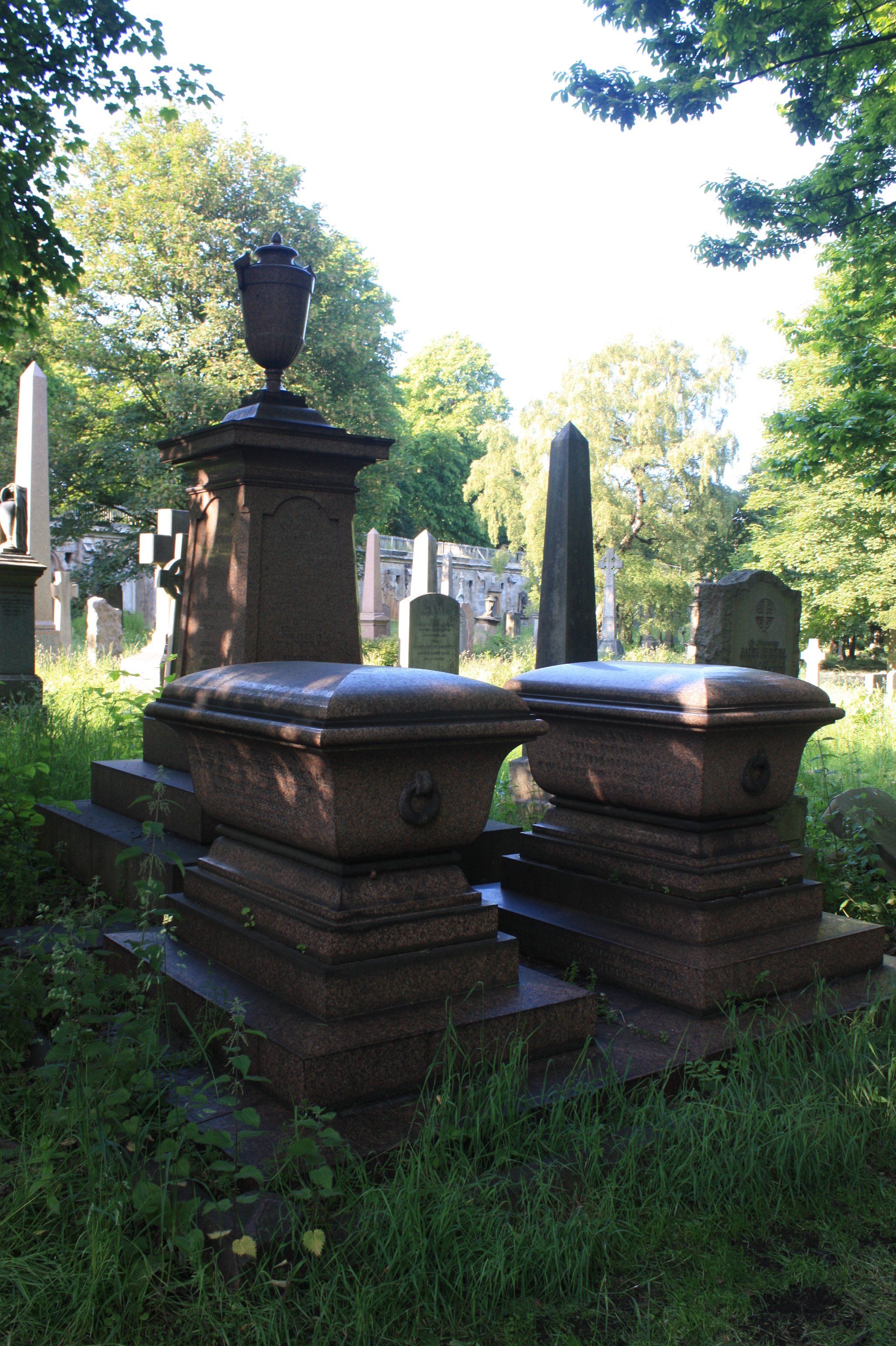
The unusual twin grave of William Taylour Thomson and his wife, Warriston Cemetery, Edinburgh

Sir William Taylour Thomson KCMG CB (1813–1883) was a British military officer and diplomat.

== Military career ==
He was a gifted military officer. When the British ship Tigris sank in the Euphrates river he was one of the survivors. In 1839 he participated in taking of Herat. He served in Iran in 1849 and 1853 to 1855.

== Diplomatic career ==
He was the British chargé d'affaires to Persia between 1849 and 1855 and envoy extraordinary and minister plenipotentiary between 1872 and 1879. He was succeeded by his younger brother Ronald Ferguson Thomson.

He retired to Edinburgh living at 27 Royal Terrace, an impressive Georgian townhouse on Calton Hill.

He died on 15 September 1883 and is buried in Warriston Cemetery in an unusual double sarcophagus next to his wife. The grave lies on the north side of a main diagonal path just south of the vaults.
