= Robert Macaire (diplomat) =

British diplomat

His Excellency Robert Macaire CMG
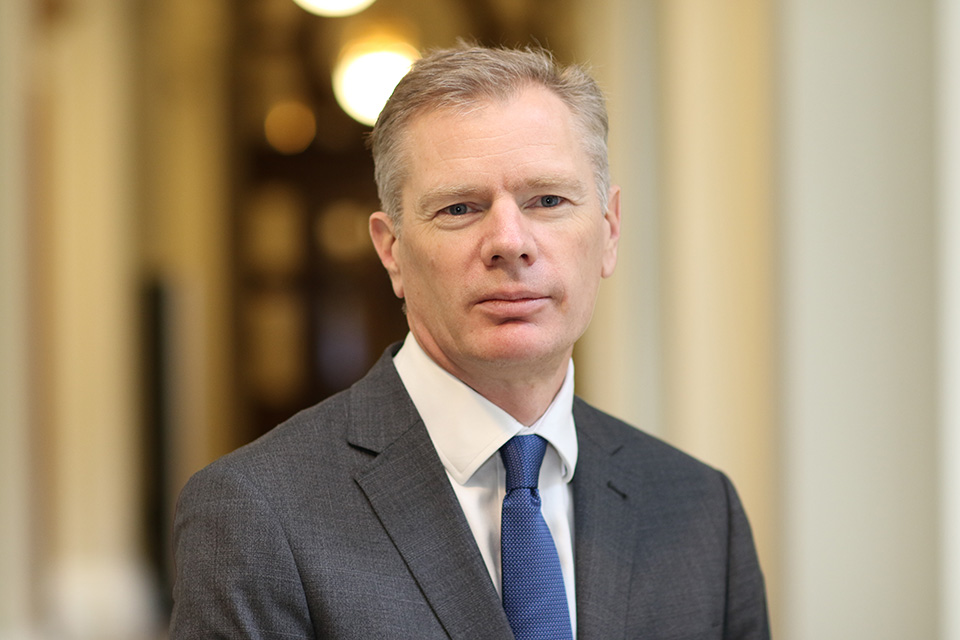
- Macaire in 2018

British Ambassador to Iran
- In office 14 March 2018 – August 2021
- Monarch: Elizabeth II
- Prime Minister: Theresa May; Boris Johnson
- Preceded by: Nicholas Hopton
- Succeeded by: Simon Shercliff

Personal details
- Born: 19 February 1966 (age 60)
- Spouse: Alice (née Mackenzie)
- Children: 2
- Education: St Edmund Hall, Oxford (MA)

Robert Nigel Paul Macaire CMG (born 19 February 1966) is a British diplomat who served as the UK's Ambassador to Iran from 2018 to 2021.

Macaire has held a number of senior posts in the Foreign and Commonwealth Office (FCO), and prior to his Iran posting he was the Director of Political Risk in BG Group plc.

== Career ==
Rob Macaire joined the Ministry of Defence in 1987, and worked on a number of issues including procurement policy and supporting Special Forces, before transferring to the Foreign and Commonwealth Office (FCO) in 1990. His first diplomatic posting was in Bucharest, Romania from 1991 to 1995. He returned to the UK to work on the Middle East, following which he was posted to Washington, as First Secretary Middle East and Counter Terrorism, from 1998 to 2002. This included dealing with the aftermath of the 9/11 terrorist attacks.

In 2002 Macaire returned to London to head the Counter Terrorism Policy Department in the Foreign Office in the immediate post 9/11 period. He served as Political Counsellor in New Delhi, India from 2004 to 2006, during which time he led a team responding to the 2004 Indian Ocean earthquake and tsunami in Phuket, Thailand. He returned to London as Director of Consular Services, responsible for all support to UK nationals abroad, including crisis response. In 2008 he was appointed British High Commissioner to Nairobi, Kenya, where he served until 2011. In Nairobi, he was involved among other things with Kenyans' efforts to fight corruption in their country, support for Kenya's new constitution in 2010, and was responsible for UK dealings with Somalia, including kidnap and hijack cases.

Macaire then worked for five years as Director of Political Risk in BG Group plc, after which he returned to the British Foreign and Commonwealth Office and in March 2018 was announced as the new envoy to Tehran. He served as Ambassador to Iran from April 2018 to July 2021. That period was dominated by nuclear diplomacy, as the United States applied a 'maximum pressure' campaign, and by negotiations to release British detainees held in Iran.

After returning from Tehran, Macaire took up the job as Chief Adviser, UK and International Affairs at the mining company Rio Tinto in January 2022. In 2023 he was elected onto the Council of Chatham House, and sits on a number of other boards including the Thunderbird Project.

=== Arrest in Iran ===
Macaire was arrested on 11 January 2020 during protests in Tehran about the shooting down of Flight 752 to Ukraine, but released shortly afterwards. In reaction, the FCO described his arrest as "a flagrant violation of international law", and Foreign Secretary Dominic Raab suggested that Iran was engaged in a "march to pariah status". Macaire maintained he did not attend a protest, but a vigil for victims of the plane crash and noted that "arresting diplomats is of course illegal".

Iranian judges called on the government to expel Macaire by declaring him persona non grata as placards and cutouts of him were burnt, and protesters chanting 'Death to the UK' outside the British Embassy in the capital Tehran. This is not thought to be a formal declaration and so does not have any legal standing with regard to his diplomatic status.

== Personal life ==
Macaire was educated at Cranleigh School and won an Exhibition to St Edmund Hall, Oxford (MA Modern History). In 1996, he married Alice (née Mackenzie). While they were stationed in Kenya, Alice founded and chaired the initiative which resulted in the transformation of the Karura Forest. They have two daughters.

Diplomatic posts
Preceded by Adam Wood	British High Commissioner to Kenya; 2008–2011	Succeeded by Peter Harris Tibber
Preceded by Nicholas Hopton	British Ambassador to Iran; 2018–2021	Succeeded by Simon Shercliff
