= Simon Hemans =

British diplomat (1940–2021)

Sir Simon Nicholas Peter Hemans CMG (1992), CVO (1983) (19 September 1940 – 17 December 2021) is a former British diplomat.

From 1966 to 1967, he was second secretary at the British Embassy in Moscow. He returned to the Foreign and Commonwealth Office (FCO) in 1968. In 1969, he served as the deputy to the High Commissioner in Anguilla, and in 1982 that in Nairobi, Kenya. From 1989 to 1992, he led the Soviet Union desk at the FCO. At the end of his career, he served as Ambassador in Kyiv, Ukraine from 1992 to 1995, and from 1995 bis 1997 as High Commissioner in Nairobi, Kenya.
