= Harold Berners Walker =

British diplomat (born 1932)

Sir Harold "Hooky" Berners Walker, KCMG (born 19 October 1932) is a British former diplomat. He served as British Ambassador to Bahrain (1979–81), the United Arab Emirates (1981–86), Ethiopia (1986-1990) and finally Iraq (1990–91).

== Early life ==
The son of Admiral Sir Harold Walker and grandson of Lieutenant-General Sir Harold Walker, Sir Harold Walker was born in 1932, and attended Winchester College and later Worcester College, Oxford.

== Career ==
From 1956 to 1992 he was a career diplomat. From 1958 to 1962 he lived in Dubai, and subsequently served as British ambassador to Bahrain (1979–81), the United Arab Emirates (1981–86), Ethiopia (1986-1990) and finally Iraq (1990–91).

During the First Gulf War, he served to Iraq on his last duty from 1990 to 1991, and was awarded a KCMG in that year.

== Retirement ==
Since retirement from the diplomatic service in 1992, Walker has continued his interest in the Arab world. He is a member of Council for Arab-British Understanding (CABU), and a trustee of the Next Century Foundation. In 2004, he re-entered the public eye as one of the signatories of the letter to Tony Blair from former British diplomats criticising his approach to foreign policy in the Middle East. He was formerly Chairman of the Royal Society for Asian Affairs, and currently serves as one of its honorary vice-presidents.
