= List of ambassadors of the United Kingdom to Yemen =

The ambassador of the United Kingdom to the Republic of Yemen is the United Kingdom's foremost diplomatic representative in Yemen, and head of the UK's diplomatic mission in Sana'a.

Operations at the British Embassy in Sana'a were temporarily suspended on 11 February 2015 due to the deteriorating security situation which preceded the Yemeni Civil War. The ambassador and his team are currently based in Saudi Arabia and Jordan.

== Ambassadors ==
=== People's Democratic Republic of Yemen (South Yemen) ===
- 1970–1972: Arthur Kellas
- 1972–1975: Granville Ramage
- 1975–1983: No ambassador various Chargé d'Affaires.
- 1983–1985: Peter Keegan Williams
- 1986–1989: Arthur Marshall
- 1989–1990: Douglas Gordon

=== Yemen Arab Republic (North Yemen) ===
- 1971–1973: Michael Edes
- 1973–1976: Derrick Carden
- 1977–1978: Benjamin Strachan
- 1979–1984: Julian Walker
- 1984–1987: David Tatham
- 1987–1990: Mark Marshall

=== Republic of Yemen ===
- 1990–1993: Mark Marshall
- 1993–1995: Douglas Gordon
- 1995–1997: Douglas Scrafton
- 1997–2001: Victor Henderson
- 2001–2004: Frances Guy
- 2004–2007: Michael Gifford
- 2007–2010: Timothy Torlot
- 2010–2011: Jonathan Wilks
- 2012–2013: Nicholas Hopton
- 2013–2015: Jane Marriott
- 2015–2017: Edmund Fitton-Brown
- 2017–2018: Simon Shercliff
- 2018–2021: Michael Aron
- 2021–2023: Richard Oppenheim
- 2023-present: Abda Sharif
