= Grace Summerhayes =

Grace Maria Linton Summerhayes MacRae (1894–1993) was a British obstetrician who worked in Africa.

== Biography ==
Summerhayes had her first experience of medicine as an orderly at the Scottish Women's Hospital at Royaumont in 1917 during the First World War. This hospital, with entirely female doctors and other staff, worked close to the front line and was at one point overrun by fighting. Summerhayes subsequently trained in medicine, tropical medicine and obstetrics.

Summerhayes set up the first colonial run maternity hospital in the Gold Coast (modern-day Ghana), at Korle-Bu Teaching Hospital (KBTH), Accra, in 1928. This was one of the first to provide European midwife and later obstetric training in Africa and was very influential in the development of European style midwife and obstetric services in the Gold Coast and wider West Africa. At Korle-Bu she trained the country's first European trained midwives, who subsequently went on to develop the colonial style of the profession in the Gold Coast with Isabella Eyo, Adelaide Mallet, Comfort Addo, Grace Koi and Sarah Okine, then trained as nurses. She also undertook research into causes of anaemia in pregnancy.

Summerhayes subsequently married the lead surgeon in Korle-Bu, Alexander MacRae, and, due to the colonial regulations at the time as a married woman, had to resign her post. She and MacRae returned to England, and she resumed medical practice. Summerhayes was a public health advocate and active in local politics until her 90s.

Her grandson, Sir Chris Whitty, became Chief Medical Officer for England.
