= List of ambassadors of the United Kingdom to Bahrain =

The ambassador of the United Kingdom to Bahrain is the United Kingdom's foremost diplomatic representative in the Kingdom of Bahrain and is head of the UK's diplomatic mission in Manama. The official title is His Britannic Majesty's Ambassador to the Kingdom of Bahrain.

== List of heads of mission ==
=== Ambassador to Bahrain ===
- 1971–1972: Alexander Stirling
- 1972–1975: Robert Tesh
- 1975–1979: Edward Given
- 1979–1981: Harold Walker
- 1981: David Crawford
- 1981–1984: Roger Tomkys
- 1984–1988: Francis Trew
- 1988–1992: John Shepherd
- 1992–1996: Hugh Tunnell
- 1996–1999: Ian Lewty
- 1999–2003: Peter Ford
- 2003–2006: Robin Lamb
- 2006–2011: Jamie Bowden
- 2011–2015: Iain Lindsay
- 2015–2019:Simon Martin
- 2019–2023: Roderick Drummond
- 2023–2026: Alastair Long
- 2027–present: Thomas Allan
