= Jonathan Wilks =

British diplomat

Jonathan Wilks CMG
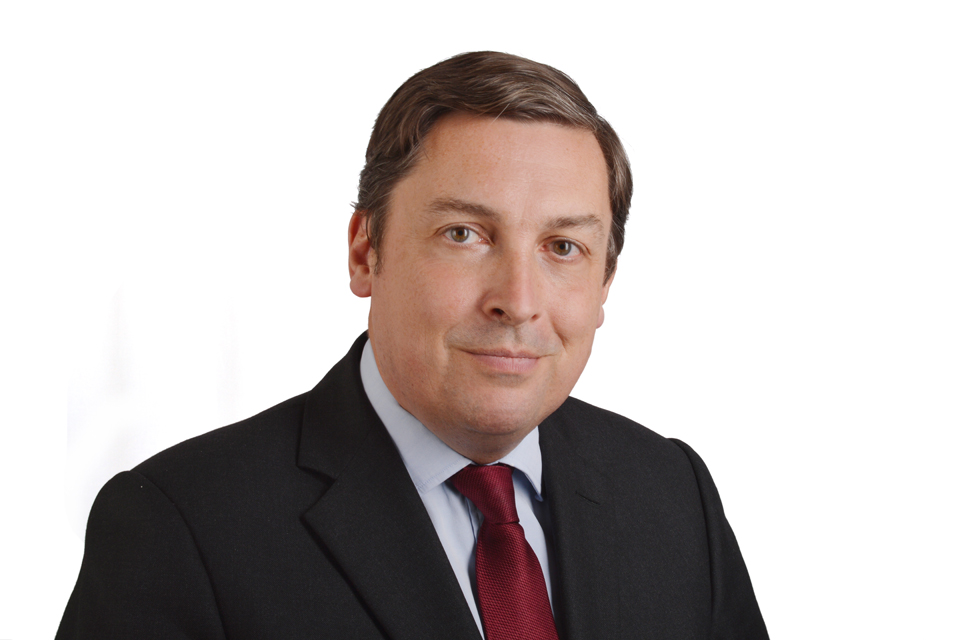

British Ambassador to Iraq
- In office 2017 – September 2019
- Monarch: Elizabeth II
- Prime Minister: Theresa May; Boris Johnson
- Preceded by: Frank Baker
- Succeeded by: Stephen Hickey

British Ambassador to Oman
- In office 2014–2017
- Monarch: Elizabeth II
- Prime Minister: David Cameron; Theresa May
- Preceded by: Jamie Bowden
- Succeeded by: Hamish Cowell

British Ambassador to Yemen
- In office 2010–2011
- Monarch: Elizabeth II
- Prime Minister: David Cameron
- Preceded by: Timothy Torlot
- Succeeded by: Nicholas Hopton

Personal details
- Born: 30 September 1967 (age 58) Callow End, Worcestershire, England
- Education: The Chase School
- Alma mater: Durham University (BSc)

Jonathan Paul Wilks CMG (born 30 September 1967) is a British diplomat who was the Ambassador to Iraq from 2017 to 2019, Ambassador to Oman from 2014 to 2017 and Ambassador to Yemen from 2010 to 2011.

== Career ==
Wilks was born at Callow End, Worcestershire, and educated at The Chase School, Malvern, and Durham University where he graduated in 1989 with a BSc degree in natural sciences. He was also President of the Durham Union.

After graduation he joined the Foreign and Commonwealth Office (FCO). After Arabic language training in London and Cairo 1991–1993 he was posted to Khartoum 1993–1996 and Riyadh 1996–1999. He then returned to Durham University for a MA in Middle East Politics (2000), then went to St Antony's College, Oxford for a MPhil in International Relations (2002). After six months' secondment at the Cabinet Office, he was deputy head of the team that reopened the British mission in Baghdad after the Iraq War, from April to November 2003. He was deputy head of the Iraq policy unit at the FCO 2004–2005 and of the security policy group 2005–2007. In 2007 he was appointed the British government's first regional Arabic spokesman, based in Dubai. He was deputy head of mission in Baghdad 2009–2010, then Ambassador to Yemen 2010–2011. In 2012 he did the Higher Command and Staff Course at the Military Staff College, Shrivenham, then was UK Special Representative to the Syrian Opposition 2012–2013, UK Special Representative for Syria 2013–2014 and Ambassador to Oman 2014–2017.

Wilks was appointed CMG in the 2012 Birthday Honours.

He retired from the diplomatic service in 2023 after his role as the British ambassador to Qatar. He was succeeded by Neerav Patel.

Diplomatic posts
Preceded by Timothy Torlot	British Ambassador to Yemen; 2010–2011	Succeeded by Nicholas Hopton
Preceded by Jamie Bowden	British Ambassador to Oman; 2014–2017	Succeeded by Hamish Cowell
Preceded by Frank Baker	British Ambassador to Iraq; 2017–2019	Succeeded by Stephen Hickey
