= Michael O'Neill (diplomat) =

British diplomat

Michael Angus O'Neill CMG (born 1965) was a British diplomat. From 2014 until 2018, he was a United Nations Assistant Secretary-General and the Director of External Relations and Advocacy in the United Nations Development Programme (UNDP), appointed by United Nations Secretary-General Ban Ki-moon on 4 February 2014, replacing Sigrid Kaag.

Prior to this, he served as Head of Mission at the Helmand Provincial Reconstruction Team in Afghanistan and as the United Kingdom's Special Representative for Sudan. He has also held appointments at the UK Embassy in Washington and at the UK missions to the United Nations in New York and the European Union in Brussels, as well as in the Foreign and Commonwealth Office in London and the United Kingdom Delegation to the North Atlantic Treaty Organization (NATO) in Brussels.

O'Neill holds a master's degree in Classics and Modern History from Brasenose College, Oxford University, and a master's degree in West European Politics from the London School of Economics. He is married and has four children.
