= 2019 New Year Honours =

British royal recognitions

The 2019 New Year Honours are appointments by some of the 16 Commonwealth realms to various orders and honours to recognise and reward good works by citizens of those countries. The New Year Honours are awarded as part of the New Year celebrations at the start of January and were officially announced in The London Gazette at 22:30 on 28 December 2018. Australia, an independent Realm, has a separate honours system and its first honours of the year, the 2019 Australia Day Honours, coincide with Australia Day on 26 January.

The recipients of honours are displayed as they were styled before their new honour and arranged by the country whose ministers advised the Queen on the appointments, then by the honour and by the honour's grade (e.g. Knight/Dame Grand Cross, Knight/Dame Commander etc.), and then by divisions (i.e. Civil, Diplomatic, and Military), as appropriate.

== United Kingdom ==
Below are the individuals appointed by Elizabeth II in her right as Queen of the United Kingdom with honours within her own gift and with the advice of the Government for other honours.

=== The Order of the Companions of Honour ===
==== Member of the Order of the Companions of Honour (CH) ====
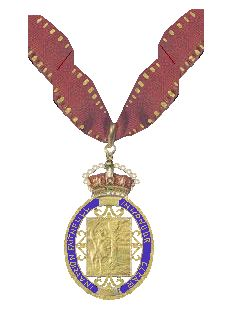
The riband and badge of a Member of the Order of the Companions of Honour

- Margaret Atwood, CC, OOnt, FRSC – Author. For services to literature.

=== Privy Counsellor ===
- Sir Edward Leigh — MP for Gainsborough.
- Philip Dunne – MP for Ludlow.
- Sir Roger Gale – MP for North Thanet.

=== Knight Bachelor ===
- Richard John William Alston, CBE, Dancer and Choreographer. For services to Dance.
- William Blackledge Beaumont, CBE, DL, Chairman, World Rugby. For services to Rugby Union Football.
- Ian Craig Blatchford, Director, Science Museum Group. For services to Cultural Education.
- Donald Hood Brydon, CBE, Chairman, London Stock Exchange, Sage Group plc, and Medical Research Council. For services to Business and to charity.
- The Rt. Hon. Alan Campbell, CBE, MP. For political service.
- Alastair Nathan Cook, CBE. For services to Cricket.
- Professor Jeremy James Farrar, OBE, Director, The Wellcome Trust. For services to Global Health.
- Professor Michael Anthony John Ferguson, CBE, FRS, Regius Professor of Life Sciences and Academic Lead for Research Strategy, University of Dundee. For services to Science.
- Professor Melvyn Francis Greaves, Director, Centre for Evolution and Cancer, The Institute of Cancer Research. For services to Childhood Leukaemia Research.
- Professor Alexander Norman Halliday, FRS, Lately Professor of Geochemistry, University of Oxford. For services to Science and Innovation.
- Professor David Klenerman, FRS, Professor of Biophysical Chemistry, University of Cambridge. For services to Science and to the Development of High Speed DNA Sequencing Technology.
- James Henry Leigh-Pemberton, CVO, Chairman, UK Financial Investments. For services to Financial Services, to British Industry and to Government
- John Henry James Lewis, OBE. For services to the Arts and to Philanthropy.
- James Mackey, Chief Executive, Northumbria Healthcare NHS Foundation Trust. For services to Health in England and to the community in North Tyneside and Northumberland
- Professor Jonathan Robert Montgomery, Chair, Health Research Authority and Professor of Healthcare Law, University College London. For services to Bioethics and to Healthcare Law.
- Philip Nicholas Outram Pullman, CBE, Author. For services to Literature.
- The Rt. Hon. John Alan Redwood, MP, Member of Parliament for Wokingham. For political and public service.
- Roy Alexander Stone, CBE, Principal Private Secretary, Government Chief Whip's Office. For parliamentary and public service.
- Gary Nicholas Streeter, MP, Member of Parliament for South West Devon. For political and public service.
- Dr. Patrick John Thompson Vallance, Government Chief Scientific Adviser. For services to Open Clinical Science.

=== The Most Honourable Order of the Bath ===
==== Knight / Dame Commander of the Order of the Bath (KCB / DCB) ====
Military Division

- General Mark Alexander Popham Carleton-Smith, CBE, ADC

Civil Division

- Richard Heaton, CB – Permanent Secretary, Ministry of Justice. For public service.
- Jonathan Michael Thompson – Chief Executive, HM Revenue and Customs. For public service.

==== Companion of the Order of the Bath (CB) ====
Military Division

- Rear Admiral Paul Methven
- Rear Admiral John Stuart Weale, OBE
- Acting Lieutenant General Martin Charles Marshall Bricknell, QHP
- Major General Susan Kerstin Ridge
- Air Marshal Sean Keith Paul Reynolds, CBE, DFC
- Air Vice-Marshal Andrew Mark Turner, CBE

Civil Division

- Gillian Elizabeth Aitken – Director General, General Counsel and Solicitor, HM Revenue and Customs. For services to Taxpayers and to Social Mobility.
- Myfanwy Barrett – For parliamentary service.
- Julie Gillis – Programme Director, Department for Work and Pensions. For public service.
- Patricia Jane Hayes – Director General for Roads, Devolution and Motoring, Department for Transport. For services to Transport.
- Dr. James Colin Richardson – Chief Economist, National Infrastructure Commission. For public service.
- Neil Thompson – Ministry of Defence. For services to Defence.
- Peter Derek Watkins, CBE – Director General, Strategy and International, Ministry of Defence. For services to Defence.
- Richard Ian West – Disability Services and Dispute Resolution Director, Department for Work and Pensions. For public service.

=== The Most Distinguished Order of Saint Michael and Saint George ===
==== Knight / Dame Commander of the Order of St Michael and St George (KCMG / DCMG) ====
- Laurence Stanley Charles Bristow, CMG – H.M. Ambassador, Moscow, Russia. For services to British foreign policy.
- Michael Edward Palin, CBE – Actor, writer, television presenter. For services to travel, culture and geography.

==== Companion of the Order of St Michael and St George (CMG) ====
- Michael Matthew Keating – For services to international diplomacy, conflict prevention and human rights.
- Alistair William James Morgan – For services to British foreign policy.
- Stuart Godfrey Popham – For services to strengthening Britain's contribution to international and economic relations.
- Colin Martin Reynolds – For services to the Foreign and Commonwealth Office.
- Lindsay Samantha Skoll – For services to British foreign policy.
- Mervyn Lloyd Samuel Thomas – For services to human rights and to the freedom of religion or belief.
- Seamus James Philip Tucker – For services to national security.

=== The Royal Victorian Order ===
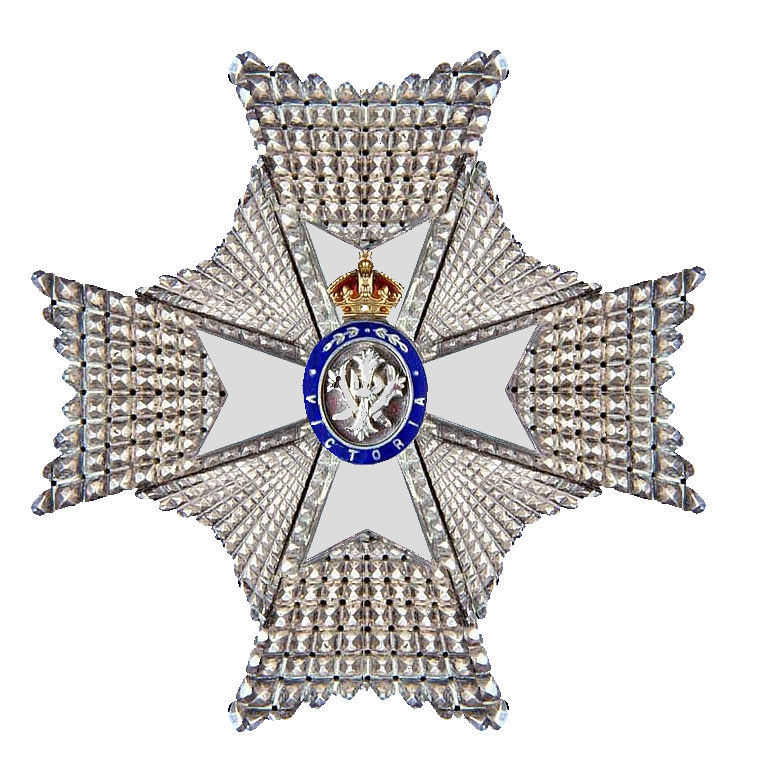
Insignia of a Knight / Dame Commander of the Royal Victorian Order

==== Knight / Dame Commander of the Royal Victorian Order (KCVO / DCVO) ====
- The Hon. Elizabeth Susan Cunliffe-Lister – Lord-Lieutenant of the East Riding of Yorkshire
- Susan Louise Wigley, CVO – Lady in Waiting to The Duchess of Gloucester
- The Rt. Hon. The Lord Bridges, CVO – Personal Solicitor to The Queen
- Richard Wilson Jewson, JP – Lord-Lieutenant of Norfolk

==== Commander of the Royal Victorian Order (CVO) ====
- Mark Wentworth Foster-Brown – Formerly Chairman, The Wessex Youth Trust
- Colonel William Toby Browne, LVO – Crown Equerry, Royal Household
- Annabel Frances Dunkels, LVO – Director of Communications and Business Development, Royal Collection.
- Mark Thomas Fraser, LVO, OAM – Formerly Official Secretary to the Governor-General of Australia
- Celia Jane Innes, LVO – Lady in Waiting to The Princess Royal
- David Byron Lewis – Lord-Lieutenant of West Glamorgan
- Captain Ian McNaught – Deputy Master, Trinity House

==== Lieutenant of the Royal Victorian Order (LVO) ====
- Ricki Brian Ashbee, LVO – Formerly National Executive Director, The Duke of Edinburgh's International Award in Canada.
- Carol Buckley, MVO, OAM – Official Secretary to the Governor of Western Australia.
- Air Commodore Mark Alexander Robert Gower, AM – Official Secretary to the Governor of Queensland.
- Lindsay Jane Harris – Lady in Waiting to Princess Michael of Kent.
- Helen Suzanne Lofthouse-Jackson – Assistant Private Secretary to The Earl and Countess of Wessex.
- Nicholas Marden – Formerly Private Secretary to The Duke of Kent.
- Charles Alexander MacDermot-Roe – Head of HR (Operations), Royal Household.
- Dr. Jeremy Johnston Russell – Apothecary to The Queen at Sandringham.

==== Member of the Royal Victorian Order (MVO) ====
- Natasha Archer – Personal Assistant to The Duke and Duchess of Cambridge.
- Patricia Anne Barton – Garden Party Office Manager, Royal Household.
- Jacqueline Bowden – Retail Operations Administrator, Royal Collection.
- Alexandra Buck – Senior Collections Information Assistant (Paintings), Royal Collection.
- Tania Marie Carnegie – Formerly Lady in Waiting to The Countess of Wessex in Canada.
- Janet Mary Cole – Visitor Services Manager, Royal Collection, Windsor Castle.
- Sonia Alison Davies – Lieutenancy Clerk for Dyfed.
- Patricia Joyce Eearl, RVM – Housekeeper, Sandringham House.
- Alexandra Sarah Gavin – Executive Assistant and Programme Co-ordinator to The Private Secretary to The Queen.
- Constable Simon Nicholas Hart – For services to Royalty and Specialist Protection, Metropolitan Police.
- Steven Bruce Kingstone – Formerly The Queen's Media Secretary.
- Nicholas Andre Oram, RVM – Senior Dining Room Assistant, Royal Household.
- William Edward Scott – Head of Fire and Security, Palace of Holyroodhouse.
- Sheena Ann Stuart – Housekeeper, Balmoral Castle.
- Jennifer Vine – Deputy Correspondence Co-ordinator, Private Secretary's Office, Royal Household.
- Tony Scott Wheeler – Mechanical and Electrical Supervisor, London Palaces, Royal Household.
- Patricia Deirdre Windsor – Programme Co-ordinator, Household of The Prince of Wales and The Duchess of Cornwall.

=== Royal Victorian Medal (RVM) ===
Silver – Bar

- James Priestley Hoyle, RVM – Warehouse Stock Supervisor, Royal Collection.

Silver

- David Mark Albon – Fencer/Landscaper, Windsor Great Park, Crown Estate.
- Constable Joanne Marie Breen – For services to Royalty and Specialist Protection, Metropolitan Police.
- Karen Jayne Buckle – Cook, Highgrove House.
- Austin David Clarke – Former Head Groom, Household of The Duke of Cambridge and The Duke of Sussex.
- Marlene Jones – Housekeeping Assistant, Highgrove House.
- Robert Charles Simpson-Last – Palace Attendant, Royal Household.
- Stephen Leatherby – Postman, Buckingham Palace.
- Michael Joseph McGuire – Gentleman of the Choir, Her Majesty's Chapels Royal, St James's Palace.
- Gordon Raymond John Robinson – Warden, Windsor Great Park, Crown Estate.
- Kevin Paul Strong – Palace Attendant, Buckingham Palace.
- Meera Parikh Torchy – Chef, Household of The Prince of Wales and The Duchess of Cornwall, Clarence House.
- Andrew John Wightman – Valet to The Duke of Edinburgh.
- Robert John Wilson – Master of the Household's Department, Royal Household.

=== The Most Excellent Order of the British Empire ===
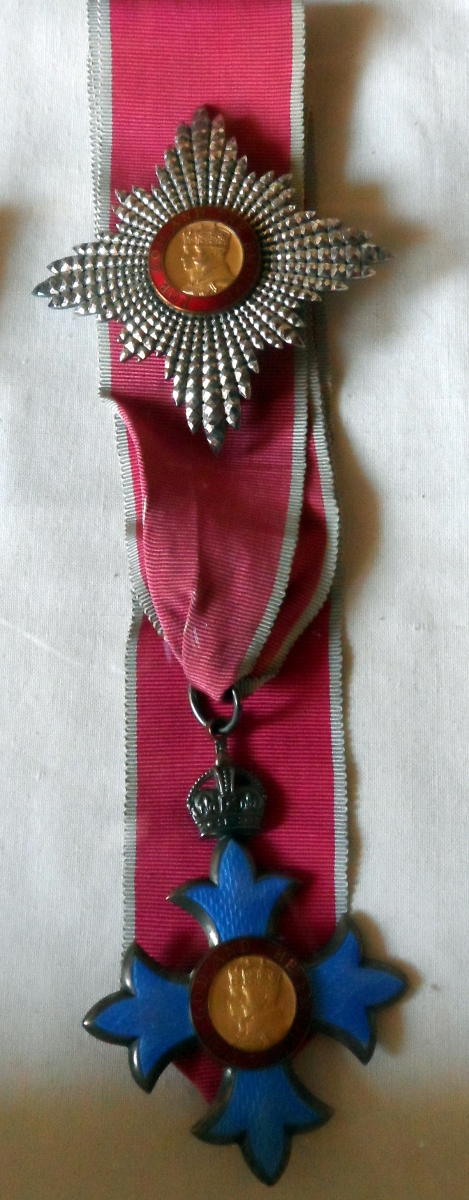
Insignia of a Knight Commander of the Order of the British Empire

==== Knight / Dame Grand Cross of the Order of the British Empire (GBE) ====
Civil division

- The Rt. Hon. The Lady Higgins, DBE, QC – former President of the International Court of Justice. For services to international law and justice

==== Knight / Dame Commander of the Order of the British Empire (KBE / DBE) ====
Military Division
Royal Navy

- Vice Admiral Clive Charles Carruthers Johnstone, CB, CBE, ADC

Civil Division

- Professor Madeleine Julia Atkins, CBE – Lately Chief Executive, Higher Education Funding Council for England. For services to Higher Education.
- Glenda Adrienne Bailey, OBE – Publisher. For services to journalism and the GREAT Britain campaign.
- Jayne-Anne Gadhia, CBE – Lately Chief Executive Officer, Virgin Money. For services to Financial Services and Women in the Financial Industry.
- Ann Heron Gloag, OBE – For services to Business and Philanthropy.
- Marianne Griffiths – Chief Executive, Western Sussex Hospitals NHS Foundation Trust and Brighton and Sussex University Hospitals NHS Trust. For services to the NHS.
- Lesley "Twiggy" Lawson – For services to Fashion, Arts and charity.
- Louise Livingstone Martin, CBE – For services to Sport.
- Mary Thérèse Ney – For services to Local Government.
- Alison Nimmo, CBE – Chief Executive, The Crown Estate. For public service and services to the Exchequer.
- Professor Ann Louise Robinson – Director, Newcastle University Institute for Ageing and Professor of Primary Care and Ageing, Newcastle University. For services to Primary Care.

==== Commander of the Order of the British Empire (CBE) ====
Military Division
Royal Navy

- Rear Admiral Paul Austin Chivers, OBE
- Brigadier Rory Sandham Copinger-Symes – Royal Marines
- Commodore Michael John Delane Walliker, OBE

Army

- Brigadier James Drew Daniel, MBE
- Brigadier Peter Dennis
- Brigadier Andrew Timothy Jackson
- Colonel James Graham Robinson
- Brigadier David William Southall, OBE

Royal Air Force

- Group Captain Mark Robert Flewin
- Air Vice-Marshal Michael Patrick Hart
- Group Captain Timothy Telfer Jones

Civil Division

- Tera Pauliina Allas – Senior Fellow, McKinsey Center for Government and lately Deputy Head, Government Economic Service. For services to Economic Policy.
- Kenneth James Allison – Director, Environment Agency. For services to the Environment
- Councillor Sean Brian Anstee – Lately Leader, Trafford Council. For services to Local Government.
- Christopher Bailey-Woods, MBE – President and lately Chief Creative Officer, Burberry. For services to Fashion
- Alison Jill Baptiste – Flood and Coastal Risk Management Director, Environment Agency. For services to the Environment.
- Professor Robert Bartlett, FBA FRSE – Emeritus Professor of Medieval History, University of St Andrews. For services to History.
- Dr. Clair Elizabeth Baynton – Deputy Director for Emergency Preparedness, Resilience and Response, Department for Health and Social Care. For services to Emergency Planning and Response in Health.
- Nicola Benedetti, MBE – Violinist. For services to music.
- Katherine Bennett, OBE – Senior Vice President, Airbus in the UK. For services to the Aerospace and Aviation Sectors.
- Professor Ewan Birney, FRS – Joint Director, European Bioinformatics Institute. For services to Computational Genomics and Leadership across the Life Sciences.
- Colonel John Nicholas Blashford-Snell, OBE – For services to Scientific Research Abroad and to Young People in the UK.
- Michelle Ann Bolger – Chief Nursing Officer, Birmingham Women's and Children's NHS Foundation Trust. For services to Paediatric Nursing and Patient Safety.
- Edwin John Booth, DL – For services to Business and charity.
- Alison Jane Brittain – Chief Executive, Whitbread plc. For services to Business.
- Barry Thomas Burton – Director, Corporate Operations, Defence Equipment and Support, Ministry of Defence. For services to Defence.
- Catherine (Kate) Thomson Caithness, OBE – President, World Curling Federation. For services to Sport.
- Nicholas David George Coburn – Group Managing Director and Deputy Chairman, Ulster Carpet Mills (Holdings) Limited. For services to the Economy in Northern Ireland.
- Professor Jane Frances Cummings – Chief Nursing Officer for England and Regional Director, London NHS England. For services to Nursing and the NHS.
- Timothy Mark Dannatt – Head of Acquisition, Queen Elizabeth Class, Ministry of Defence. For services to Defence Acquisition.
- Katherine Ann Davies, OBE – Director of Health and Justice, Armed Forces and Sexual Assault Services, NHS England. For services to Diversity and Equality in Healthcare.
- Tacita Charlotte Dean, OBE – Visual artist. For services to art.
- Elizabeth Denham – For services to Protecting Information.
- Professor Fiona Devine, OBE – Head, Alliance Manchester Business School and Professor of Sociology, University of Manchester. For services to the Social Sciences
- Julia Catherine Donaldson, MBE – Author. For services to literature.
- Susan Douglas-Scott – Chair, Independent Living Fund Scotland. For services to Human Rights, Disability and LGBT Issues.
- Thomas Patrick Dowdall – Deputy Director, National Crime Agency. For services to Tackling Organised Crime.
- Stephen Phillip Dunn – Chief Executive, West Suffolk NHS Foundation Trust. For services to Health and Patient Safety.
- The Reverend Joel Nigel Patrick Edwards – For services to Tackling Poverty and Injustice.
- Andrew Henryk Fender – For political service.
- Kevin Fitzpatrick – Senior Vice-President, Manufacturing, Purchase, Supply Chain Management, Nissan Europe. For services to Manufacturing and Engineering in the North East.
- Brigadier Paul Andrew Flanagan – Secretary General, UKspace Trade Association. For services to the UK Space Sector.
- Councillor Nicholas Iain Forbes – Leader, Newcastle City Council. For services to Local Government.
- Christine Ann Gaskell, MBE DL – Chair, National Local Enterprise Partnership Network Management Board. For services to the community in Cheshire.
- Dr. Andrew Keith Goodall – Chief Executive, NHS Wales. For services to Health, Social Care and public service in Wales.
- David Victor Gothard – Lately Director Riverside Studios. For services to Cinema and Drama.
- Professor Huon Hamilton Gray – National Clinical Director for Heart Disease, NHS England and Consultant Cardiologist, University Hospital Southampton NHS Foundation Trust. For services to Cardiology.
- Professor David Mino Allen Green – Vice Chancellor and Chief Executive, The University of Worcester. For services to Higher Education.
- Paul Anthony Grimwood – For services to the food and drinks industry in the UK and overseas.
- Professor William Trevor Hamilton – Professor of Primary Care Diagnostics, University of Exeter. For services to Improving Early Cancer Diagnosis.
- Lindsay Margaret Hayward Smith – Trustee, Education and Training Foundation. For services to Further Education.
- Susan Jane Hemming, OBE – Head of Special Crime and Counter Terrorism Division, Crown Prosecution Service. For services to Law and Order, particularly in Counter Terrorism.
- Robert Alan Heslett – Chair, Personal Support Unit. For services to Access to Justice for Litigants in Person.
- Professor Frederick David Richard Hobbs – Director, National Institute for Health Research School, for Primary Care Research, Oxford. For services to Medical Research.
- Duncan Wade Jacques – Chief Executive Officer, Exceed Academies Trust. For services to Education.
- Gurinder Singh Josan – For political service.
- Dr. Sridevi Kalidindi – Consultant Psychiatrist in Rehabilitation and Recovery, South London and Maudsley NHS Foundation Trust. For services to Rehabilitation Psychiatry.
- Dr. Bryan Keating, OBE – For services to Economic Development in Northern Ireland.
- Professor Veronica Lewis, MBE – Lately Joint Principal, The Conservatoire for Dance and Drama. For services to Higher Education in Dance, Drama and Circus Arts in the UK and Abroad.
- Professor David Noel Livingstone, OBE FBA – Professor of Geography and Intellectual History, Queen's University Belfast. For services to Scholarship in Geography, History of Science and Intellectual History.
- William David Macfarlane – Deputy Principal Private Secretary to the Prime Minister, No10 Downing Street. For public service.
- Juergen Wolfgang Maier. For services to UK/German relations.
- Professor Geoffrey Colin Maitland, FREng – Professor of Energy Engineering, Imperial College London. For services to Chemical Engineering.
- Lynda Marginson – Director, National Probation Service, North East Division. For services to Probation and Criminal Justice.
- Nicholas Berkeley Mason – Drummer. For services to music.
- Cecilia Mathieson – Ministry of Defence. For services to Defence.
- Dr. William James McBride, MBE – For services to Rugby Union.
- Ian Alexander McCafferty – External Member, Bank of England Monetary Policy Committee. For services to the Economy.
- Steven Scott McCarthy – Minister of Defence Materiel, British Defence Staff Washington. For services to Defence.
- Professor John Christopher McCrudden, FBA – Professor of Human Rights and Equality Law, Queen's University Belfast. For services to Human Rights Law.
- Edward Mark McGuckin – Senior Officer, Public Legal Service Division, Northern Ireland Executive. For services to the Criminal Justice System in Northern Ireland.
- Professor Iain McInnes – Muirhead Professor of Medicine and Director, Institute of Infection, Immunity and Inflammation, University of Glasgow. For services to Medicine.
- Simon Patrick McKinnon – Digital Director for Children, Health and Pensions Services, Department for Work and Pensions. For public service.
- Geva Kate Mentor. For services to netball.
- Ruth Miskin, OBE – For services to Education and Reading.
- Sheila Mitchell – Director of Marketing, Public Health England. For services to Public Health.
- Claire Louise Murdoch – National Director for Mental Health, National Health Service England and, Chief Executive, Central and North West London NHS Foundation Trust. For services to the NHS.
- Diana Mary Murray – Chair, Arts and Business Scotland. For services to the Cultural and Historic Environment in Scotland.
- Professor Ian Gordon Murray – For services to Motoring.
- Professor David Richard Newell – Emeritus Professor of Cancer Therapeutics, Northern Institute for Cancer Research. For services to Medical Research and Drug Development.
- Christopher Edward Nolan – Director. For services to drama.
- Rodney Hugh Norman – Lately Finance Director, National Savings and Investments, and lately Treasury Accountant, HM Treasury. For services to Taxpayers.
- Sophie Okonedo, OBE – Actress. For services to drama.
- Christopher Gary Packham – Naturalist, television presenter. For services to nature conservation.
- Dr. Helen Pankhurst – Senior Adviser, CARE International. For services to Gender Equality.
- Professor Alison Macdonald Park – Professor of Social Research and Director, CLOSER, University College London Institute of Education. For services to the Social Sciences.
- John Ward Pawson – Architectural Designer. For services to Design and Architecture.
- James David Alexander Ramsbotham – Chief Executive, North East England Chamber of Commerce. For services to Business and the Economy in the North East.
- Meurig David Raymond, MBE – Lately President, National Farmer's Union. For services to Farming.
- Royston Rickhuss – General Secretary, Community Union. For services to the Steel Industry.
- Bridget Clare Rosewell, OBE – Economist and Commissioner, National Infrastructure Commission. For services to the Economy.
- Nitin Sawhney – Musician and Composer. For services to Music.
- Richard Craig Scudamore – Former executive chairman, Premier League. For services to football.
- Yinka Shonibare, MBE – Visual artist. For services to art.
- Dr. Claire Lamorna Stevens – Consultant in Paediatric Dentistry, Manchester University NHS Foundation Trust and President, British Society of Paediatric Dentistry. For services to Children.
- Mustafa Suleyman – For services to the UK Technology Industry.
- John Martin Taylor – Vice Chairman of the Board, RTL Group and Member, Financial Policy Committee. For services to the Economy.
- Ian Cornelius Thomas – For services to Local Government and Children's Services.
- Anthony Van Laast, MBE – Choreographer. For services to Dance and Choreography.
- Brigadier Geoffrey Charles Van Orden, MBE MEP – For political service.
- The Reverend Paula Anne Vennells – Chief Executive, Post Office Ltd. For services to the Post Office and to charity.
- Mark Waddington – Chief Executive Officer, Hope and Homes for Children. For services to Global Child Protection.
- Gillian Claire Wearing, OBE – Conceptual Artist. For services to art.
- Andrea Jane Wilson – Senior Manager, National Crime Agency. For services to Law and Order and Diversity in the Workplace.
- Dr. Margaret Melrose Wilson, DL – Headteacher, The King John School, Essex. For services to Education.
- John Gibbon Wood – Chairman, Tolent Construction Ltd. For services to the Building and Civil Engineering Industry.

==== Officer of the Order of the British Empire (OBE) ====
Military Division
Royal Navy

- Commodore David Stephen George Bartlett
- Captain (now Commodore) Timothy Michael Henry
- Commander Neil John Lamont
- Captain Jason Lee Poole
- Lieutenant Colonel (now Colonel) Philip Mark Totten, MBE – Royal Marines
- Captain Kenneth David Whitfield

Army

- Colonel Paul Julian Armstrong
- Lieutenant Colonel Nicholas Marshall Wight-Boycott – The Royal Regiment of Scotland
- Lieutenant Colonel Neil James Mark Budd, MBE – Royal Regiment of Artillery
- Lieutenant Colonel James Robert Hing, QGM – The Parachute Regiment
- Acting Colonel Kim James Knutton – Army Cadet Force
- Lieutenant Colonel David Mark Stoter – Royal Corps of Signals
- Lieutenant Colonel Samuel Roy Stuthridge – Corps of Royal Engineers
- Colonel Ross David Thurlow
- Colonel Stuart Charles Williams

Royal Air Force

- Wing Commander Mark Donald Abtahams, MBE
- Wing Commander Paul John Crook
- Group Captain Ian James Fancourt
- Wing Commander Kevin Lee Gatland
- Wing Commander Christopher Robert Melville, MBE
- Squadron Leader David Alan Montenegro
- Group Captain Nicola Suzanne Thomas

Civil Division

- Abolade Akinwale Abisogun, Chief Executive Officer, Urbanis Ltd. For services to Diversity and Young People in the Construction Industry.
- Kevin James Adams, Lately First Secretary, Home Affairs, British Embassy, Washington. For services to National Security.
- Joan Nicol Aitken, Traffic Commissioner for Scotland. For services to the Scottish Transport System and Road Safety.
- Mark Allen, Chief Executive, Dairy Crest. For services to the Dairy Sector.
- Paul James Anderson, lately Deputy Head of Mission, British Embassy Tehran, Iran. For services to British foreign policy.
- Professor Jane Margaret Armitage, Professor of Clinical Trials and Epidemiology, MRC Population Health Research Unit, University of Oxford. For services to Medical Research.
- Professor William John Armitage, Emeritus Professor, University of Bristol and Director, Bristol Tissue Bank. For services to Corneal Transplantation.
- Catherine Elizabeth Jane Arnold, lately H.M. Ambassador, Ulaanbaatar, Mongolia. For services to British foreign policy.
- Shirley Anne Atkinson, Lately Vice-Chancellor, The University of Sunderland. For services to Widening Participation in Higher Education.
- Michael Paul Bacon, Deputy Head, Relationships Team, Foreign and Commonwealth Office. For services to national security
- Malcolm Howard Beatty, Lately Chief Executive, Forest Service, Department of Agriculture, Environment and Rural Affairs, Northern Ireland Executive. For services to the Natural Environment.
- John Patrick Beavis, Trauma and Orthopaedic Surgeon and Founder and Chair, IDEALS. For services to Victims of War and Disaster.
- Graham Bell. For services to Education, Residential Child Care and Social Enterprise.
- Peter Bennett, Managing Director, Prefabricated Access Suppliers' and Manufacturers' Association and Chairman, Access Industry Forum. For services to Business.
- Dr. Neil Bentley-Gockmann, Chief Executive Officer, WorldSkills UK. For services to Equality in Business.
- Heba Bevan, Managing Director, UtterBerry Ltd. For services to Innovation, Technology and STEM Education.
- Ruby Khalid Bhatti. For services to Young People and Housing.
- Helen Bingley. For voluntary service in the UK and Abroad.
- Thomas Benjamin Blomfield, Co-Founder and Chief Executive, Monzo. For services to Improving Competition and Financial Inclusion in the Banking Sector.
- Richard Boggis-Rolfe, Chairman, National Employers Advisory Board. For voluntary service to the Armed Forces Reserves.
- Peter Nigel Boorman, Regional Lead for Emergency Preparedness, Resilience and Response, NHS England (London). For services to Emergency Response.
- Dr. Henrietta Bowden-Jones, Founder and Director, National Problem Gambling Clinic. For services to Addiction Treatment and Research.
- Professor Sonia Boyce, MBE, Artist. For services to Art.
- David Charles Bragg, Founder, Send a Cow. For services to Tackling Poverty in Africa.
- Carol Ann Brooks, Lately Chief Examiner, CACHE. For services to Early Years Education.
- Mark James Brooks, Chair of Trustees, Mankind Initiative Charity. For services to Male Victims of Domestic Abuse.
- Philippa Ann Broom. For public and political service.
- Christopher John Brown, DL, Chair of Council, University of Huddersfield. For services to Higher Education.
- Annette Bruton, Lately Principal, Edinburgh College. For services to Education.
- William Bryden, Head of Scenes of Crime, British Transport Police. For services to Policing.
- Owen Everton Burke, Chair of Governors, Burton and South Derbyshire College. For services to Further Education.
- Jane Elizabeth Burrows, Assistant Head, Resilience and Sustainability, HM Naval Base Devonport. For services to the Royal Navy.
- Stephen Butt, Deputy Director, Foreign and Commonwealth Office. For services to national security.
- Elizabeth Ashley Cadman, Deputy Head, Department for International Development, Jordan. For services to International Development.
- Donald Alexander Cameron, Managing Director, Cameron Optometry. For services to Eyecare in Scotland.
- Maureen Campbell, Lately Chair, Scottish Swimming. For services to Swimming.
- Professor Anne Carlisle, Vice-Chancellor, Falmouth University. For services to Higher Education in Cornwall.
- James Edward Carter, Actor. For services to drama.
- Grenville James Chamberlain. For services to the Caravan Club and to charity.
- Farooq Ur Rehman Chaudhry, Producer. For services to Dance and Dance Production.
- Pauline Chelmsford, Deputy Director Large Business, HM Revenue and Customs. For services to Improving UK Customs Capability.
- Bunny (Karen Anne) Christie, Production Designer. For services to Theatre.
- Stephen Alan Coleman, Chief Executive Officer, CodeBase. For services to Technology Entrepreneurship.
- Caroline Ingrid Collier, Director of Partnerships and Programmes, Tate. For services to Galleries, Museums and the Arts in the UK.
- Ann Colette Connor, Lately Education Adviser, Department for Education. For services to Education.
- James Sidney William Cooper. For voluntary political service in the West Midlands.
- Andrew Richard Cotter, Ministry of Defence. For services to Defence.
- David John Cowley, Chairman and Trustee, The Not Forgotten Association. For services to Service Personnel.
- Hilary Susan Craft, BEM, Founder and Chair, Action Against Cancer. For services to Fundraising and Research into Cancer Diagnostics and Treatments.
- Martin Knox Crawford, Chairman, Barewa Rugby Club, Nigeria. For services to rugby and the community in Nigeria.
- Professor Thomas David Lewis Crosby, Consultant Clinical Oncologist, Velindre Cancer Centre. For services to Cancer Services in Wales.
- Professor David Cunningham, Consultant Oncologist, The Royal Marsden NHS Foundation Trust and Professor of Cancer Medicine, The Institute of Cancer Research. For services to Cancer Treatment and Research.
- Eran Cutliffe, Specialist Prosecutor, Special Crime Division, Crown Prosecution Service. For services to Law and Order.
- Leon Alistair Daniels, Managing Director, Surface Transport. For services to Transport for London.
- Catherine Anne De Marco, Deputy Director for Infrastructure Skills and Efficiency, Department for Transport. For services to Transport Skills.
- Professor Ian John Deary, FBA FRSE, Professor, Differential Psychology and Director, Centre for Cognitive Ageing and Cognitive Epidemiology, University of Edinburgh. For services to the Social Sciences.
- Dr. Malcolm McKinnon Dick, Director, Centre for West Midlands History, University of Birmingham. For services to History in the West Midlands.
- Karen Grace Dobson, Principal, Newcastle and Stafford College Group. For services to Further Education in Staffordshire.
- Patrick Joseph Doherty, Chairman, Harcourt Developments. For services to the Transformation of the Titanic Quarter Site, Belfast.
- Professor Brian William Dolan, Visiting Professor of Nursing, Oxford Institute for Nursing, Midwifery and Allied Health Research. For services to Nursing and Emergency Care.
- Nigel John Duncan, Principal, Fareham College. For services to Further Education.
- Professor Joanna Dunkley, Professor, Princeton University, United States of America. For services to science.
- Barry Eccleston, lately President and Chief Executive Officer, Airbus Americas. For services to the United Kingdom aerospace and aviation industry.
- Michael John Edwards, Vice President, Save the Children. For services to Philanthropy and Children in Sierra Leone.
- David Fairclough, Assistant Director, Immigration Enforcement, Home Office. For services to Law Enforcement and Tackling Organised Crime in the UK and Overseas.
- Robert John Fairweather, lately Chief of Cabinet, Organisation for the Prohibition of Chemical Weapons, The Hague, the Netherlands. For services to international relations.
- Alison Denise Fendley, Executive Director, Forensic Archive Limited. For services to Forensic Science.
- Stephen John Fidler, Deputy Director, Road Investment Strategy Client, Department for Transport. For services to Transport.
- Mustafa Field, MBE. For services to Faith Communities and Social Cohesion.
- The Rt. Hon. The Baroness Ford. For services to Sport and Business.
- Anthony Frank Ford-Shubrook, Youth Ambassador, Able Child Africa and Trustee, Alliance for Inclusive Education. For services to Children with Disabilities in Africa.
- Dr. Charles Edward MacDonald Foster, Reader in Physical Activity and Public Health, Bristol University. For services to the Promotion of Physical Activity.
- Dr David William Foster, Trustee, The Queen's Nursing Institute. For services to Nursing and Midwifery.
- Vivien Foster, Co-Founder, Merchant Navy Association. For services to the Merchant Navy Association.
- Julian Henry Francis, Consultant, Bangladesh. For services to development in Bangladesh.
- Lucy Kathleen, Lady French. For services to the Arts and Young People.
- Anne-Marie Fry, Head of Chemical, Biological, Radiological and Explosive (Protect), Home Office. For services to Countering Terrorism.
- Rodney William Gardner, Head of Network Operations, Northern Powergrid. For services to Energy Resilience.
- William James Gardner, For services to Child Internet Safety in the UK.
- Charles Edmund Garrett, lately H.M. Ambassador, Skopje, Macedonia. For services to British foreign policy.
- Dr. Edmund Graham Gibbons, former Minister of Cabinet, MP and Leader of the Opposition. For services to Bermuda.
- Clare Denise Gibbs, Strategic Partnering Manager, Cabinet Office. For public service.
- Robert Glick. For services to People with HIV.
- Dr. William James Glover. For voluntary service.
- Professor Daniel Grelan Gorman. For voluntary service to the Promotion of Science and Engineering and STEM Education in Kilmarnock and Ayrshire.
- Mark Anthony Gower, Detective Superintendent, Metropolitan Police Service. For services to Policing.
- Carol Ann Graham, Head of State Pathology Branch, Northern Ireland Executive. For services to Justice in Northern Ireland.
- Henry Gregg, MBE. For services to Football.
- Norman Griffin, Senior Manager, Long Term and High Security Estate Directorate, Ministry of Justice. For services to Public Sector Prisons.
- Professor Hugh Duncan Griffiths, Thales/Royal Academy of Engineering Chair of RF Sensors, University College London and Volunteer, Institution of Engineering and Technology. For services to Engineering.
- Michael Raymond Grist, Area Business Manager, Cymru-Wales, Crown Prosecution Service. For services to Law and Order
- Professor Sarah Victoria Hainsworth, Pro-Vice-Chancellor and Executive Dean, School of Engineering and Applied Science, Aston University. For services to Engineering and Forensic Science.
- Michael James Hamilton, Founder and Chief Executive Officer, Commando Joe's. For services to Young People.
- Professor Ian Francis Hancock, University of Texas at Austin. For services to creole linguistics, Romani studies and community development.
- Timothy Douglas Harford, Economist and Journalist. For services to Improving Economic Understanding.
- Derek Edward Harris, Member, Minds Matter Trading Activities Board. For services to charity and Charitable Fundraising.
- Christopher John Harrop, Group Marketing Director and Director of Sustainability, Marshalls plc. For services to the Prevention of Modern Slavery and Exploitation.
- Jonathan Eugene Hart, Volunteer, Lochaber Mountain Rescue Team. For services to Mountain Rescue in Scotland and to charity.
- Malcolm Arthur Colson Hay, Curator, Parliamentary Art Collection. For services to Parliament's Art and Heritage.
- John Richard Healy, Private Secretary, Office of the Parliamentary Counsel. For public service.
- Lorraine Margaret Heath, Chief Executive Officer, Uffculme Academy Trust. For services to Education.
- Gerald William Heddell, Director for the Inspections, Enforcement and Standards Division, Medicines and Healthcare Products Regulatory Agency. For services to Healthcare.
- Brendan Joseph Heneghan, Principal, William Henry Smith School, West Yorkshire. For services to Special Educational Needs.
- Charles John Henning. For services to Agriculture.
- Robin Charles Hindle Fisher, Business Coach and Executive Mentor, Hay Hill Partners. For services to Financial Services.
- Rachel Hogan, Director, Ape Action Africa, Cameroon. For services to conservation.
- Basil Gervase Francis Gerard Hood, Head of Resilience, Office of the Secretary of State for Scotland. For services to National Security.
- Deirdre Houston, Deputy Principal, Northern Ireland Statistics and Research Agency. For services to Integrated Education in Randalstown.
- Sarah Anne Pascale Hulton, Head of Democratic People's Republic of Korea Department. For services to British foreign policy.
- Sophie Humphreys, Founder, Pause. For services to Children's Social Care.
- Joanna Catherine Hunter, Honorary Treasurer and Co-Founder, Smart Works. For services to Disadvantaged Women through Employment Skills Training.
- Isaac Kwamina Idun, Acting Detective Sergeant, Metropolitan Police Service. For services to Policing.
- Brian Ingram, Director, Youth Justice Agency. For services to Vulnerable Children and Adults in Custody.
- Keith Ireland, Lately Managing Director, City of Wolverhampton Council. For services to Local Government in the West Midlands.
- Mary Sheila Isherwood, Headteacher, Camberwell Park School, Manchester. For services to Children and Young People with Special Educational Needs.
- Alby (Albert) James, Director. For services to Film, Theatre and Broadcasting.
- Dr. Jagbir Jhutti-Johal, Senior Lecturer in Sikh Studies, University of Birmingham. For services to Higher Education, Faith Communities and the Voluntary Sector.
- Helen Johnson, Head of Children's Services, The Refugee Council. For services to Refugees.
- Richard Johnson, Jump Jockey. For services to Horse Racing.
- Adrian Christopher Joseph. For services to Equality and Diversity in Business.
- Patricia Denise Kane, Executive Headteacher, The Education and Leadership Trust. For services to Education.
- Dr. Vinod Kapashi. For services to Jainism.
- Tom Karen. For services to Design.
- Abyd Karmali, Managing Director of Climate Finance, Bank of America Merrill Lynch. For services to International Climate Change and Sustainable Finance.
- Anne Catherine Kay, Chief Information Officer, Directorate for Digital, Scottish Government. For services to Digital Development.
- Professor Simon Peter Jabir Kay, Consultant Plastic Surgeon, Leeds Teaching Hospitals NHS Trust. For services to Complex Reconstructive Hand Surgery including Hand Transplantation.
- Colin Jeffery Kelsey, Head of Emergency Planning, Resilience and Response, Greater Manchester Health and Social Care Partnership. For services to the community in Manchester.
- Umer Khan, Superintendent, Greater Manchester Police. For services to Policing and Community Cohesion.
- Christopher Ross Kingsley, Co-founder, Rebellion. For services to the Economy.
- Ming Wai Kong, Senior Lawyer, Government Legal Department. For services to Energy Policy.
- Lucy Lake, Chief Executive Officer, Camfed International. For services to Young People in Africa.
- Sandra Mary Laurenson, Chief Executive, Lerwick Port Authority. For services to the UK Ports Industry and the Scottish Economy.
- Anne Lavery, Chief Operating Officer, Citizens' Advice Scotland. For services to Consumers.
- John James Lawlor – Chief Executive, Northumberland, Tyne and Wear NHS Foundation Trust. For services to the NHS.
- Therese Lebedis, Consultant Occupational Therapist in Stroke, NHS Grampian. For services to Stroke Care and Rehabilitation Services, particularly in Scotland.
- Dr. Stephen John Lee, Programme Group Manager, Forest Resources and Management, Forestry Commission. For services to Forestry.
- William James Barry Liles, Lately Principal and Chief Executive Officer, Coleg Sir Gâr and Skills Champion for Wales. For services to Skills and Young People in Wales.
- Paul John Lindley, Entrepreneur and Founder, Ella's Kitchen. For services to Exports in the Food and Drink Sector and to Children's Welfare.
- Professor Raymond Lawrence Linforth, Vice Chancellor and Principal, University College Birmingham. For services to Higher and Further Education in the West Midlands.
- Alma Mary Loughrey. For services to Children in the Early Years Education in Northern Ireland.
- Councillor Rory Cassian Love, Chairman, Conservative Councillors' Association. For public and political service.
- Neil Campbell MacInnes, President, Society of Chief Librarians. For services to the Public Libraries Sector.
- Sheriff Colin Scott MacKenzie, DL. For services to the community in the Western and Northern Isles of Scotland.
- Susan Ann MacKenzie, Captain, 2nd Inverness Girls' Brigade, East Church, Inverness. For services to Young People.
- Helen Margaret MacLagan. For services to Heritage and Culture.
- Elizabeth Ann Maher. For services to Diversity and Economic Development.
- Nasar Mahmood, Chairman, British Muslim Heritage Centre. For services to Community Relations in Manchester.
- Imam Mohamed Hassan Yousef Mahmoud, Imam, London. For services to the community in London.
- Peter Manning, Head, Essex International. For services to UK/China relations.
- Professor Helen Zerlina Margetts, Professor of Society and the Internet and lately Director, Oxford Internet Institute. For services to Social and Political Science.
- Ian Marshall. For services to Business, charity and Health.
- Professor David James Martin, Professor of Geography, University of Southampton. For services to Geography and Population Studies.
- Adam Matan, Managing Director, Anti-Tribalism Movement. For services to the Somali community in the UK and to wider UK/Somalia relations.
- Adrian McAllister, Deputy Chief Constable, Lancashire Constabulary. For services to Policing, Criminal Justice and Child Protection.
- Professor James Charles McElnay, Lately President and Vice-Chancellor, Queen's University Belfast. For services to Higher Education and Pharmacy.
- Gillian McManus, Emergencies Management Resilience Adviser, Ministry of Housing, Communities and Local Government. For services to Improving Resilience.
- Patrick Michael Mears, External Consultant, HM Revenue and Customs. For services to Preventing Abusive Tax Avoidance.
- Professor Anna Louise Meredith. For services to Animal Welfare and the Veterinary Profession
- Thomasina Jean Miers, Chef and Restaurateur. For services to the Food Industry.
- Paul Joseph Moorby, Managing Director Chipside. For services to promoting UK technology sector abroad.
- Elsa Mary Morris. For public and political service in the European Parliament.
- Samuel Mullins, Director, London Transport Museum. For services to the London Transport Museum.
- Aamer Naeem, Chief Executive Officer, Penny Appeal. For services to Muslim Community Development.
- Andrew Colin Nairne. For services to Museums and to the Arts.
- Professor Mary Elizabeth Nevill, Head of Sports Science, School of Science and Technology, Nottingham Trent University. For services to Sport and to Sports Science.
- David Grahame Newborough. For services to Skills in the Energy and Utility Sector.
- Melanie Thandiwe Newton, Actress. For services to film and charity.
- Phillip George Nicholas, Team Leader, Foreign and Commonwealth Office. For services to national security.
- Emma Jill Nottingham, lately First Secretary, British Embassy, Moscow, Russia. For services to British foreign policy.
- Phillip Noyes, Chief Advisor on Child Protection, NSPCC. For public service.
- Anne Obey, Director of Financial Reporting, Nationwide Building Society. For services to Financial Reporting and to Sustainable Energy.
- Professor Raffaella Ocone, Professor of Chemical Engineering, Heriot-Watt University. For services to Engineering.
- Cornelius Michael O'Connor, Deputy Director, National Army Museum. For services to Military Heritage.
- Cordelia O'Hara, Lately Director, UK System Operator, National Grid. For services to the Energy Industry.
- Paul Okroj, Chair, Scottish Volunteering Forum and Befriending Networks in Scotland. For voluntary service.
- Emilie Oldknow. For political service.
- Richard Scott Oliver, Chair of the British Business Group Abu Dhabi. For services to the British community and British business in the United Arab Emirates.
- David Olusoga. For services to History and community integration.
- Maureen Patricia O'Neill, Director, Faith in Older People. For services to Older People and Voluntary Organisations
- Joy Montalba Ongcachuy, Theatre Sister, Barts Health NHS Trust. For services to Healthcare.
- Anthony John Osmond, Lately Non-Executive Director, Disabled People's Employment Corporation. For services to People with Disabilities.
- Councillor Ivan Donald Ould, Cabinet Member for Children and Young People, Leicestershire County Council. For services to Local Government.
- Dr. Adrian Mark Owen, Canada Excellence Research Chair in Cognitive Neuroscience and Imaging at Western University, Canada. For services to scientific research.
- Deborah Jean Oxley. For services to Employee Ownership and Social Enterprise.
- Alexander Robert Nigel Parish, Principal Dancer, Mariinsky Ballet, St Petersburg, Russia. For services to dance and UK/Russia cultural relations.
- Richard Gino Parker, Chief Executive, Doncaster and Bassetlaw Teaching Hospitals NHS Foundation Trust. For services to Sustainable Care.
- Dr. Vijaykumar Chhotabhai Kalidas Patel, Chief Executive Officer, Waymade Pharmaceuticals. For services to Business and Philanthropy.
- Alexandra Elizabeth Peace-Gadsby, Director, Fylo Enterprises. For services to Entrepreneurship and the community in Newark.
- Alan Edward Peterson. For services to Charitable Fundraising in Wales.
- Helen Christine Pettifor, Director of Professional Standards and Workforce Development, Education and Training Foundation. For services to Further Education.
- Katherine Fiona Phillip, Deputy Complex Trauma Manager, Defence Medical Rehabilitation Centre. For services to Armed Forces Casualty Recovery.
- Dr. Nicola Phillips, Professor of Sport and Exercise Physiotherapy, Cardiff University. For services to Physiotherapy.
- Sandra Olubunkunola Popoola, Head of Capability Building and Resourcing, Ministry of Housing, Communities and Local Government. For services to Local Government and charity.
- Rachel Dawn Pounds, Head of Operations, Emergency Health Unit, Save the Children. For Humanitarian services.
- Mark Anthony Prince, Founder, The Kiyan Prince Foundation. For services to Tackling Knife and Gang Crime in London.
- Dr. Malik Jonathan Ramadhan, Consultant and Divisional Director in Emergency Care, Barts Health NHS Trust. For services to Healthcare.
- Karen Redhead, Lately Principal and Chief Executive Officer, Derwentside College. For services to Further Education.
- Dr. Andrew William Guest Rees, Head of Waste Strategy, Welsh Government. For services to the Environment and Recycling in Wales.
- Hazel Elizabeth Renwick, District Manager, Work Services Directorate Department for Work and Pensions. For public service.
- Christopher Barry Riddell, Illustrator. For services to Illustration and charity.
- Ray Christopher John Riddoch, UK Managing Director, Nexen. For services to the Oil and Gas Industry.
- Tanya Natasha Robinson, Head of Equalities and Lammy Delivery. For services to HM Prison and Probation service and charity.
- Louisa Helen Rolfe, Deputy Chief Constable, West Midlands Police. For services to Policing.
- Cindy Helen Rose, UK Chief Executive Officer, Microsoft. For services to UK Technology.
- Marie Roulston, Executive Director, Social Work, Northern Health and Social Care Trust. For services to Healthcare and Young People.
- Kevin Paul Rousell, Head of Claims Management Regulation, Ministry of Justice. For services to Claims Management Regulation.
- Professor Lynette Joy Ryals, Pro Vice Chancellor, Cranfield University. For services to Higher Education.
- Sukhjeev Sandhu, Founder and Chief Executive Officer, Audeliss and INvolve. For services to Diversity in Business
- Caroline Monica Elisabeth Ann Schofield, Principal, The Langlands School and College, Chitral, Pakistan. For services to education and the community in northern Pakistan.
- Dr. Jennifer Mary Schooling, Director, Centre for Smart Infrastructure and Construction, University of Cambridge. For services to Engineering and Digital Construction.
- Dr. William Scott, Chief Executive, Wilton Group. For services to the Engineering and Offshore Wind Sector and the community on Teesside.
- Professor Jonathan Robert Seckl, Moncrieff Arnott Professor of Molecular Medicine, and Vice Principal, Planning, Resources and Research Policy, University of Edinburgh. For services to Endocrinology.
- Dr. Gertrude Nimali Seneviratne, Consultant Psychiatrist, South London and Maudsley NHS Foundation Trust. For services to Perinatal Psychiatry.
- Emma Jane Senyard, Associate Director of Nursing for Surgery at Barts Health NHS Trust. For services to Healthcare.
- Patricia Shepperson. For services to Fundraising and charity.
- Howard Andrew Sinclair. For services to Homeless People.
- Michael Eric Slade, President, LandAid. For services to charity.
- Janis Sleep, Team Leader, Foreign and Commonwealth Office. For services to national security.
- Gary Smith, Headteacher, Market Field School. For services to Children with Special Educational Needs in Essex.
- Susan Lorraine Smith, Executive Chief Nurse, University Hospitals of Morecambe Bay NHS Foundation Trust. For services to the NHS and Patient Safety.
- Professor Thomas William Smith, Head of Jazz, Royal Conservatoire of Scotland, Artistic Director, Scottish National Jazz Orchestra. For services to Education and Jazz Music
- Gareth Southgate, Manager, England Football Team. For services to Football.
- Diane Spence, Senior Crown Prosecutor, North East Complex Casework, Crown Prosecution Service. For services to Law and Order.
- Janice Spencer, Assistant Director for Children's Social Care, Lincolnshire County Council. For services to Children's Social Care in Lincolnshire.
- Richard Mark Graham Stephenson. For public and charitable service.
- Alan Martin Stevens, Chair, Board of Trustees, Disability Rights UK. For services to People with Multiple Sclerosis.
- Anthony Roy Stewart, Managing Director, ASD Lighting plc and Chairman, Rotherham United Football Club. For services to Business and the community in Rotherham.
- Claire Margaret Summers, Head of Technical Innovation and Development. Police Staff, Metropolitan Police Service. For services to Counter Terrorism Policing.
- Pamela Sutton, Operational Manager, Department for Work and Pensions. For services to Disadvantaged and Unemployed People in South Wales.
- Shahed Saleem Tariq, Deputy Director of Children and Families, Leeds City Council. For services to Children's Services in Leeds.
- Jeremy Paul Taylor, Chief Executive, National Voices. For services to Health and Care Charities.
- Lynne Elizabeth Tembey. For services to the Mothers' Union, Women and Families.
- Geraint Howell Thomas, MBE, Cyclist. For services to cycling.
- Dr. Kimberly Thomas, Co-Founder, Women and Girls Network. For services to Supporting Women and Girls.
- Lorna Ann Thompson, Through Life Manager Soldier Survivability, Defence Equipment and Support. For services to Procurement.
- Dr. Richard Thompson, Head of Counter-Terrorism Strategy, Home Office. For services to Countering Terrorism.
- Professor Shirley Joy Thompson, Composer, Artistic Director and Educator. For services to Music.
- Dr. Kate (Kathleen) Tiller, Reader Emerita in English Local History, University of Oxford. For services to Local History.
- Eleanor Poulsom Tobin, Lately Principal, Joseph Chamberlain Sixth Form College. For services to Education and Young People.
- Stephen David Trow. For services to Heritage.
- Jeffrey Tudor, Policy Co-ordinator, Department For International Development Burma. For services to International Development.
- Carol Anne Tullo, Lately Queen's Printer of Acts of Parliament and Controller, Her Majesty's Stationery Office. For services to Official Publishing.
- Mark Tyrrell-Smith, Acting Head of Department, National Data Unit, National Crime Agency. For services to Law Enforcement.
- Professor Jonathan Valabhji, National Clinical Director, NHS England and Consultant Diabetologist, Imperial College Healthcare NHS Trust. For services to Diabetes and Obesity Care.
- Dr. Josephine Anne Valentine, Executive Head, Danes Educational Trust. For services to Education.
- Professor Daljit Singh Virk, Senior Research Fellow, Bangor University, Wales. For services to Tackling Poverty Abroad and Education in Derby.
- Maria Clare Walker, Lately Director of Education and Children's Services, Aberdeenshire Council. For services to Education
- Charlotte Louise De Warrenne Waller, Deputy Director Russia Policy, Foreign and Commonwealth Office. For services to British foreign policy.
- Angela Walsh, Head of NHS Pay, Department of Health and Social Care. For services to NHS Pay and Employee Relations.
- David Mcdonald Watson, Executive Principal and Chief Executive Officer of the Changing Lives in Collaboration Multi Academy Trust. For services to Education.
- George Wilson Weir, Founder, My Name'5 Doddie Foundation. For services to Rugby, Motor Neurone Disease Research and the community in the Scottish Borders.
- Julian David Whaley, former United Nations Co-ordinator. For services to the promotion of reconciliation in Sri Lanka.
- Roger Mark Whiteside, Chief Executive Officer, Greggs. For services to Women and Equality.
- Alison Whitney, Director of Engagement, Foreign and Commonwealth Office. For services to national security.
- Alison Mary Wilding, Sculptor. For services to art.
- Darius James Williams. For services to Ballet and community Dance.
- David Williams, Military Systems and Access Theme Leader, Defence Science and Technology Laboratory. For services to Defence.
- Luke Williams, Lately Chairman of the Board, Start Up Loans Company and Chief Executive, Ignata. For services to Small and Medium Sized Enterprises.
- Angela Elizabeth Windle, Team Leader, Child Protection, Safeguarding and Family Law Team, Department for Education. For services to Children's Social Care and the community in Sheffield.
- Paul Andrew Woodrow, Director of Operations, London Ambulance Service NHS Trust. For services to NHS Leadership.
- Dr. Stephen Alan Wootton, Associate Professor in Human Nutrition, University of Southampton. For services to Nutrition and Physical Exercise.
- Nicola Mary Louise Yates, Senior Vice President, Europe, Pharmaceuticals, GSK. For services to Women in Business and Workplace Equality.
- Professor Antony John Young, Consultant Surgeon, Southend University Hospital NHS Foundation Trust and National Clinical Director, Innovation, NHS England. For services to Clinical Leadership.
- Lesley Young, Chief Driving Examiner, Driver and Vehicle Standards Agency. For services to Driver Training and Testing and Road Safety.

==== Member of the Order of the British Empire (MBE) ====
Military Division
Royal Navy

- Lieutenant (now Lieutenant Commander) Phillip Blight
- Petty Officer (Diver) Darren Stephen Carvell
- Major Steven Cotton – Royal Marines
- Warrant Officer 1 (RSM) Douglas John Davitt
- Lieutenant Commander Caroline Patricia Dix
- Lieutenant Commander Claire Marie Frances Lees
- Commander Mark Lister
- Commander Stephen Andrew Mardlin
- Major Anthony Milne – Royal Marines
- Captain Ryan Michael Morris
- Warrant Officer 1 Warfare Specialist (Underwater Warfare) David Charles Smith

Army

- Captain Melonie Jane Adair – Royal Army Medical Corps
- Corporal of Horse Carl Adam Adams – The Blues and Royals (Royal Horse Guards and 1st Dragoons)
- Lieutenant Colonel Daniel James Ashton – Royal Corps of Signals
- Acting Captain Pervez Badruddin – Army Cadet Force
- Corporal Andrew Charles Barton – The Mercian Regiment
- Captain Kevin Stuart Bartram – Corps of Royal Engineers
- Major Philip Richard George Bray – The Rifles
- Acting Major Trevor Calton – Army Cadet Force
- Chaplain to the Forces 3rd Class Reverend Jason Scott Clarke – Royal Army Chaplains' Department
- Major Nicholas Peter Colquhoun – The Royal Regiment of Scotland
- Lieutenant Colonel Peter William Conn – Corps of Royal Engineers
- Major Jonathan Christopher Corbett – The Royal Logistic Corps
- Warrant Officer Class 1 Jeremy Paul Day – The Parachute Regiment
- Warrant Officer Class 1 Terry Brian Dove – The Light Dragoons
- Major Matthew Christopher Duff – Royal Corps of Signals
- Corporal Paul David Griffin – Intelligence Corps
- Sergeant Martin Peter Hunt – Corps of Royal Electrical and Mechanical Engineers
- Corporal Sohail Ifraz – Adjutant General's Corps (Staff and Personnel Support Branch)
- Major Andrew Alfred Alexander Inglis, VR – Corps of Royal Engineers, Army Reserve
- Major Mandy Islam – Royal Army Medical Corps
- Chaplain to the Forces 3rd Class Reverend Peter William Stephen King – Royal Army Chaplains' Department
- Major Paul Robert McPherson – Royal Regiment of Artillery
- Lieutenant Colonel Martin Paul Payne, BEM – Royal Army Medical Corps
- Warrant Officer Class 1 Gareth David Wolf Pryor – The Royal Logistic Corps
- Major Edward James Quicke – The Light Dragoons
- Warrant Officer Class 1 Marc David Richardson – The Royal Logistic Corps
- Acting Lieutenant Colonel Kevin Frazier Nash Roberts – Corps of Army Music
- Captain Christopher Rowan – The Parachute Regiment
- Lieutenant Scott Sears – The Royal Gurkha Rifles
- Lieutenant Colonel Brendan Shaw – Army Air Corps
- Warrant Officer Class 2 Lee Michael Shields – The Yorkshire Regiment
- Major David Joseph Stead – Corps of Royal Engineers
- Major Emma Margaret Thomas – Royal Corps of Signals
- Major James Thompson, VR – Intelligence Corps, Army Reserve
- Major Alan Patrick Tindale – The Royal Logistic Corps
- Major Arran David Egglinton Wade – The Parachute Regiment
- Major Caroline Ruth Wade – The Royal Logistic Corps
- Warrant Officer Class 2 Paul Vincent Wade – Royal Corps of Signals
- Captain James Anthony Wadsworth CGC – The Royal Logistic Corps
- Major Christopher Michael Wane – Royal Regiment of Artillery
- Major Nicola Claire Temple Wetherill – Royal Army Medical Corps
- Major Richard Peter Philip Wilson, VR – The Parachute Regiment, Army Reserve
- Captain Hannah Rose Winterbourne – Corps of Royal Electrical and Mechanical Engineers

Royal Air Force

- Flight Sergeant Brian James Aitken
- Warrant Officer Ian Melvyn Balderstone
- Wing Commander Garry Peter Ball
- Sergeant Paul Gerard Berry
- Squadron Leader Dheeraj Bhasin
- Corporal Denise Boneham
- Corporal Andrew James Branston
- Flight Lieutenant Michael Anthony Broadhurst
- Warrant Officer Simon John Hardwick
- Wing Commander John Anthony McCarthy
- Wing Commander Mark Douglas McNulty
- Squadron Leader Joanne Elizabeth Roe
- Wing Commander Daniel Lunnon-Wood

Civil Division

- Peter Newton Acheson. For services to the Voluntary and Community Sector.
- Lynette Olatunde Rachel Adjei, Lately Marketing and Promotions Officer, Birmingham City Council. For services to Adoption and Fostering Recruitment.
- Jamshaid Ahmad, Immigration Officer, London and South, Home Office. For services to Law and Order.
- Fateha Ahmed. For services to Diverse communities in Wales.
- Mark John Ainsworth-Smith, Consultant Pre-Hospital Care Practitioner, South Central Ambulance Service NHS Foundation Trust. For services to Emergency Care and Major Trauma.
- Simon Albert Albury, Chair, Campaign for Broadcasting Equality. For services to Broadcasting.
- Katie Tessa Alcott, Chief Executive Officer, FRANK water. For services to international development.
- Riaz Alidina, Head of Financial Institutions Business Risk, Lloyds Banking Group. For services to Small Business Banking.
- Mervyn John Allcock, Founder, Barrow Hill Engine Shed Society. For services to Railway Preservation and Development.
- Andrew Joseph David Allen. For services to veterans and their families in Northern Ireland.
- Maureen Allen. For services to the community in Ballymena.
- Susan Ann Allen, Director of Estates and Commercial Services, University of Glasgow. For services to Higher Education.
- Karen Anderson. For services to charity in Lancashire.
- Helen Andrews, Operations Manager, Bristol, Civil and Family Justice Centre, HM Courts and Tribunal Service. For services to Justice and the community in Bristol and Cheltenham.
- Robert Michael Andrews. For services to the Ryedale Festival, North Yorkshire.
- Martin Richard Angus. For political service.
- Celia Anne Anthony, Russia Strategy Secretariat Desk Officer, Foreign and Commonwealth Office. For services to British foreign policy.
- David Anthony Apparicio, JP, Founder and Chief Executive Officer, The Chrysalis Foundation. For services to Reducing Re-Offending.
- Roger Hollins Arden. For services to the community in Liverpool.
- Andrea Armstrong, Senior District Business Manager, Crown Prosecution Service. For services to Law and Order.
- Christopher John Armstrong. For services to the Criminal Justice System and the community in Cumbria.
- Patricia Diane Armstrong-Child, Director of Nursing, Bolton NHS Foundation Trust. For services to Nursing.
- Barbara Arrandale. For services to the community in Hasland, Derbyshire.
- Jonathan Tasso Atack, Chairman, Supervisory Board of the British School of Amsterdam, the Netherlands. For services to education and the British community in the Netherlands.
- Saeed Atcha. For services to Young People and the community in Greater Manchester.
- Gillian Atkins, Ministry of Defence. For services to Defence.
- Margaret Elizabeth Atkinson. For services to the Church and the community in Huddersfield, West Yorkshire.
- Fiona Bailey, Troubled Families Employment Adviser, Work Services Directorate, Department for Work and Pensions. For services to Vulnerable Families and Social Justice.
- Rajinder Singh Bajwe. For services to the Hospitality Industry and charity in Glasgow.
- Kevin Anatole Clinton Baker. For services to Cornish Mining Heritage and the community in Ponsanooth and Camborne.
- Louise Marie Baker-Morris, Adult Volunteer, Clwyd and Gwynedd Army Cadet Force. For voluntary service to Young People
- Enid Bakewell. For services to Women's Cricket.
- Albert Henry Edward Baldwin, Chairman, St Helena Heritage Society. For services to the community and local services in St Helena.
- Jonathan Aciea Bamborough. For services to Homeless People in Blackpool, Lancashire.
- Sujata Banerjee. For services to Dance.
- Dr. Janine Margaret Barnes, Neurology Specialist Pharmacist, The Dudley Group NHS Foundation Trust and Expert Adviser, NICE Centre for Guidelines. For services to Pharmacy.
- Lea Baroudi, President MARCH Lebanon. For services to peacebuilding and civic rights in Lebanon
- Margaret Barrett, Social Worker, Fitness to Practice Panels, Health and Care Professions Tribunal Service. For services to Leadership for Adult Social Services.
- Paul Jonathan Barrett. For services to Fundraising and the community in Canterbury, Kent.
- Glen Robert Baxter. For services to No 10 Downing Street.
- John Beaton, Works Manager, Monument Conservation Unit, Historic Environment Scotland. For services to the Built Environment and the community in Argyll.
- Dr. Stanley Gregory Beckensall. For services to Prehistoric Rock Art and History in Britain.
- Catherine Margaret Bell, Lately Director, Development and Alumni, University of Glasgow. For services to Education and charity.
- Frances Faith Bell, Teacher, Newport Primary School. For services to the Arts in Devon.
- John Alfred Bennett, Lately Chairman, Board of Governors, Guildhall School of Music and Drama. For services to the City of London and Education.
- David Berglas. For services to Magic and Psychology.
- Dr. Chris Berry, Senior Education Adviser, Department for International Development, Sierra Leone. For services to Developing Education in Sierra Leone.
- Paramdeep Singh Bhatia. For voluntary service to Minority Communities.
- Declan George Billington, Managing Director, John Thompson and Sons Ltd. For services to Economic Development in Northern Ireland.
- Christian Charles Blackshaw, Classical Pianist. For services to Music.
- Theodore Winthrop Blackwell. For services to Local Government Digital Transformation.
- Roger John Blades. For services to Athletics and School Sport.
- John Handley Blowes. For services to Renewable Energy and the community in Lancaster.
- Michelle Ann Blunsom, Chief Executive, East Surrey Domestic Abuse Services. For services to Victims and their Families in Surrey.
- Sabrina Boanu, Relationship Support Manager, Barclays. For services to Client Relationships in the Banking Sector.
- Malcolm John Bone, Chairman, Hebburn Unit, Sea Cadet Corps. For voluntary service to Young People and the community in Tyne and Wear.
- Paul Francis Boone, Manager, National Crime Agency. For services to Law Enforcement.
- Elizabeth Tarn Booth, Lately Headteacher, Dalmain Primary School. For services to Education and the Arts in the London Borough of Lewisham.
- Lorna Marie Boothe. For services to Sports Coaching and Administration.
- Zoe Alexandra Boreland, Lately Head of Midwifery, South Eastern Health and Social Care Trust. For services to Midwifery.
- Joanna Bostock, Co-founder and Joint Chief Executive Officer, Women's Sport Trust. For services to Gender Equality in Sport.
- John Charles Bowden, Station Manager, Looe Fire Station. For services to the Fire and Rescue Service and the community in Cornwall.
- Dr. Adrian Bowyer, Inventor. For services to 3D Printing.
- Alan Boyd. For services to the community in Belfast.
- Robert Andrew Richard Bradfield, Hydrographic Surveyor. For services to Navigation and Maritime Safety on the West Coast of Scotland.
- Joshua Brian Bratchley, Volunteer Cave Diver. For services to cave diving overseas.
- Ruth Mary Brent, Founder and Managing Director, Patient Experience Network. For services to Improving Patient Experiences in the NHS.
- Christopher Bridge, Chairman, Corporation Board, Colchester Institute. For services to Further Education and Skills.
- Richard Bristow. For services to Transport in London, and to the community in Hertfordshire.
- Andrew Ker Buchanan Brown, Retired Chartered Accountant, Belgium. For services to First World War commemoration and UK/Belgium relations.
- Andrew Paul Brown, Overseas Security Adviser, Foreign and Commonwealth Office. For services to national security.
- Jonathon Brown, Ministry of Defence. For services to Defence.
- Karen Brown. For services to Hockey.
- Sarah Roberta Brownlee, Chair, Southern Health and Social Care Trust Northern Ireland. For services to Health and Social Care and charitable Fundraising.
- Jane Cameron Bruce, Lately Headteacher, Papdale Primary School. For services to Education in Orkney.
- Michael John Bryant. For services to Young Boxers.
- Natasha Bucknor. For services to Theatre.
- Carol Burt-Wilson, Founder, I AM ME. For services to Disability Hate Crime Prevention.
- Jane Mary Campbell Morrison. For services to Outdoor and Adventure Sports in Scotland.
- Dr. Moira Colette Carter, Lately Associate Director, Donor and Transport Services, Scottish National Blood Transfusion Service. For services to Blood Transfusion.
- Hew Ormiston Chalmers. For services to Olympic Sport.
- Rebecca Emily Chester, Consultant Nurse and Chair, National Learning Disability Consultant Nurse Network, Berkshire NHS Foundation Trust. For services to People with Learning Disabilities.
- Abul Kalam Azad Choudhury, Founder, Azad Choudhury Academy and Welfare Trust. For services to Education in Bangladesh.
- John Donald Brian Christian, Principal, British School Tokyo, Japan. For services to education and the community in Tokyo.
- Melanie Elaine Christie-Boyle, Chief Executive, Ballymena Business Centre. For services to the Economy in Northern Ireland.
- Helen Louise Clarke. For services to Girlguiding.
- Norman Clarkson. For services to the community in West Cumbria.
- James Andrew Cliffe, Manager, No Wrong Door, Stepney Road Children's Centre, North Yorkshire County Council. For services to Children and Young People.
- John Clough, Volunteer, Domestic Abuse and Stalking Campaigns. For services to Victims of Domestic Abuse.
- Kathleen Anne Coe, Chief Executive Officer, Project Pathway. For services to Victims of Domestic Violence.
- Stephen Dennis Combe, Director, Corporate Governance and Board Secretary, Abertawe Bro Morgannwg University Health Board. For services to Governance in NHS Wales.
- Graeme Mark Connell, Founder, West Kent Debt Advice. For services to the community in Kent.
- William Harold Connor, Chief Executive, Sentinus. For services to Education.
- Andrew Cooksley, Chief Executive, Associated Community Training Limited. For services to Education.
- Nicholas David Coombe, Principal Management Technical Adviser, London Fire Brigade. For services to Fire Safety.
- Brian Whitlock Cooper. For services to the community in Lytham St Anne's, Lancashire.
- Lorraine Coulton, Senior Communications Officer, HM Naval Base Devonport. For services to the Royal Navy.
- Christopher Stodden Cowls. For services to the Church and to charity.
- Celine Collette Craig. For services to the community in Londonderry, Northern Ireland.
- Patricia Clark Erskine Craig, Personal Secretary to Director for Local Government and Communities, Scottish Government. For services to Administration.
- Derek Andrew Crawford. For services to Rugby Union.
- Henry James Crawford, Managing Director, Get Fresh NI. For services to the Northern Ireland Food and Hospitality Sectors.
- Susan Rachael Crewe-Smith, Physiotherapist, University Hospitals Coventry and Warwickshire NHS Trust. For services to Physiotherapy and voluntary service to Amateur Sports.
- Colin Francis Crooks. For services to Disadvantaged People and the Environment in London.
- Robert Cuffe, Vice Chair, Board of Directors, Darlington Building Society. For services to Business and Economic Development on Teesside.
- Audrey Cumberford, Lately Principal and Chief Executive, West College Scotland. For services to Further Education and the community in the West of Scotland.
- James William Thomas Cundall. For services to the Entertainment Industry.
- Dr. Stephen Mark Darlington. For services to Music.
- John Craig Davidson. For services to people with Tourette's Syndrome.
- Robert Gray Davidson, Chairman, The Friends of Hugh Miller. For services to Palaeontology in Scotland.
- Melanie Louise Davies, Sister, Morriston Hospital, Abertawe Bro Morgannwg University Health Board. For services to Patients with Learning Disabilities.
- Timothy John Bebb Davis, Chairman and Trustee, Blind Veterans UK. For voluntary service to Veterans.
- Jane Sarah Dawson. For public service.
- Amali Chivanthi De Alwis. For services to diversity and training in the Technology Industry.
- David Barry Dein. For services to Football and voluntary work in Schools and Prisons.
- Mario Di Maio, Operational Member, Aberdeen Mountain Rescue Team. For services to Mountain Rescue.
- Victoria Anne Dickens, Consultant Physiotherapist and Clinical Director of Orthopaedics, Salford Royal NHS Foundation Trust. For services to Physiotherapy.
- Dr. Andrew Michael Dickson. For services to Business and the community in Bolton.
- Mark Robert Stuart Dixon. For services to Children and Young People in Hampshire.
- Michelle Dawn Dobson, Director for Membership and Professional Development, Institution of Engineering and Technology. For services to Engineering.
- Patricia Louise Donald. For services to Older People in Northern Ireland.
- Thomas Watters Perry Donaldson, JP. For services to the Boys' Brigade, Lay Magistracy and Education.
- William Nigel Dougherty, Principal, Ebrington Primary School. For services to Primary Education and the community in Londonderry.
- David Douglas. For public and political service.
- Thomas Dowens, Lately Director of Coaching, Scottish Volleyball Association and Head Coach, Senior Men's National Volleyball Team. For services to Volleyball.
- Philomena Ann Drake, Lately Chair of Trustees, Colchester Citizens' Advice. For services to Disadvantaged People in Essex.
- David Graham Drinkwater, Station Volunteer, Holyhead Lifeboat Station. For services to the Royal National Lifeboat Institution and charity.
- Dr. Saroj Duggal. For services to Asian and Ethnic Minority Women.
- Mehmooda Duke DL, Founder and Chief Executive Officer, MoosaDuke Solicitors. For services to the Legal Profession and the Promotion of Female Entrepreneurship.
- Ann Veronica Dumas, Curator, Royal Academy of Arts. For services to the Arts.
- Paula Dunn, Paralympics Head Coach, UK Athletics, For services to athletics.
- Valerie Ann Dunsford, Lately Headteacher, Sheffield High School for Girls. For services to Education.
- Alison Sheila Durrands, Allied Health Professionals Professional Lead, Berkshire Healthcare NHS Foundation Trust. For services to Allied Healthcare.
- Susan Glover Durrell, Consultant Physiotherapist, Gloucestershire Hospitals NHS Foundation Trust. For services to Physiotherapy.
- Judy Ann Dyke. For services to charity particularly Edward's Trust and the community in Birmingham.
- Andrew Martin Dytch, Chief Executive, ILM (Highland). For services to the Environment and the community in the North of Scotland.
- Kirsten Barbara Dzeryn, Desk Officer, Counter Terrorism Team, Foreign and Commonwealth Office. For services to national security.
- Mary-Teresa Early, Founder, Theatre Peckham. For services to Young People in the Arts.
- Councillor Peter Robin Edgar, Executive Member for Education, Hampshire County Council. For services to Education and the community in Gosport.
- Lyndon David Edwards. For services to Farming and the community in Monmouth.
- Stephen Francis Edwards, Managing Director, Flamgard Engineering. For services to the British Economy and Exports.
- Rabbi Warren Elf. For services to the community in Manchester.
- Robert Mark Esbester, Team Leader and Student Trainer, Vision Aid Overseas. For voluntary service to Eye Care in Africa.
- Costakis Christos Evangelou. For services to Young People in North London.
- Alexander (Sandy) Stanley Farquharson, Lately Director, The Marie Trust. For services to Homeless, Disabled and Socially Excluded People.
- Anne-Louise Ferguson, Director, Shared Services Partnership Legal and Risk Services, NHS Wales. For services to NHS Wales.
- Lucy Jane Findlay, Founding Managing Director, Social Enterprise Mark Community Interest Company. For services to Social Enterprises.
- Judith Irene Fish, Owner, The Applecross Inn. For services to Tourism in the Highlands and to the community in Applecross, Ross-shire.
- Bryan Flawell, Prison Officer, HM Prison, Isle of Wight. For services to HM Prison Service and the community on the Isle of Wight.
- Ian Nigel Forster, Director, Anglo-American School, Moscow, Russia. For services to education and the British community in Moscow.
- Professor Stephen Anthony Foster. For services to the Arts in Southampton.
- David William Fox-Pitt, Director, WildFox Events. For services to the Adventure Challenge Industry and charity.
- Martin Frost. For services to Disappearing Fore-edge Painting.
- Dr. Barbara Gale, Chief Executive, St Nicholas Hospice Care Charity. For services to Hospice Care and the community in Suffolk.
- Robert Gallagher, Police Staff, Forensic and Digital Investigations Manager, North West Greater Manchester Police. For services to Policing and the community in Manchester.
- Ricky Garland, Volunteer, HELP Vega Baja, Spain. For services to British nationals in Spain.
- Richard Leon Gill, Lately Police Officer, British Transport Police. For services to Policing.
- Gordon Leonard Giltrap. For services to Music and charity.
- Rosie Kaur Ginday, Founder and Director, Miss Macaroon Community Interest Company. For services to the community in Birmingham.
- Melanie Ann Goodship. For services to Educating Young People on the Dangers of Open Water.
- Raymond Dennis John Goodwin. For services to Canoeing.
- Paul Gotts. For services to the North East of England and to the UK Processing and Engineering Industries.
- Rogers Morgan Govender, Dean of Manchester. For services to Interfaith Relations and to the community in Manchester.
- David Beresford Grant. For services to Music.
- Sharon Granville. For services to Museums.
- Colin Bruce Gray. For voluntary service to the community in Fleet, Hampshire.
- Anne Violet Green, retired Head Teacher, Tristan da Cunha. For services to the community in Tristan da Cunha
- Barbara Griffin, Trustee, Citizens' Advice Salford. For services to the voluntary sector and the community in Salford.
- David Griffiths. For services to Art, particularly Portrait Painting.
- Paul Griffiths, Chairman, Industrial and Marine Hydraulics. For services to Engineering Skills and Apprenticeships on Teesside.
- Andrew John Gritt, Lately Service and Clinical Lead, Dorset Healthcare University NHS Foundation Trust. For services to Nursing and Mental Health.
- Ajay Gudka, Trustee, Bhagvatinandji Education and Health Trust. For services to charity and the community in Gujarat, India.
- Gopal Krishan Gupta, Founder and Solicitor, Gupta and Partners, and Founder, Gupta Group. For services to British Business and Philanthropy.
- Rosemary Jeanette Gurr, Desk Officer, Latin America Department, Foreign and Commonwealth Office. For services to British foreign policy.
- Alexander Gyasi, Founder and Senior Pastor, Highway of Holiness Church. For services to the community in Haringey, London.
- Chloe Hackett, Private Secretary, Foreign and Commonwealth Office. For services to national security.
- Alison Patricia Hall, Founder, Seeds for Development. For services to Victims of War in Northern Uganda.
- Lidwina Anne-Marie Hamilton. For services to the Farming community and to charity.
- James Matthew Hanson, Desk Officer, Operations Team, Foreign and Commonwealth Office. For services to national security.
- Zuffar Iqbal Haq. For public and political service.
- Colin Harding, Staff Officer, Enniskillen Jobs and Benefits Office, Northern Ireland Executive. For services to the community in Northern Ireland.
- Frances Hardy. For services to the St John Ambulance Service.
- Keith Douglas Hardy. For services to Football and the community in Staffordshire.
- William John Harmsworth, JP. For services to the Magistracy and the community in Newdigate, Surrey.
- Roger Alan Harper, Employment Judge, South West. For charitable and voluntary service.
- Robert Vernon Harris, Deputy Launching Authority, Port Talbot Lifeboat Station, Royal National Lifeboat Institution. For services to charity.
- Stephen Craig Harrison. For services to Sport and People with Disabilities.
- Clare Margaret Hartland-Brown, Border Force Intelligence Officer, Home Office. For services to Preventing Modern Slavery.
- David Robert Hastings, Lately Chief Executive, Strathleven Regeneration Community Interest Company. For services to Economic Regeneration in West Dunbartonshire.
- Debra Ann Hazeldine, Patient Safety Campaign and Lately Member, Cure the NHS. For services to Patient Safety in Staffordshire.
- Alan George Head, Chairman, Cheltenham and Tewkesbury Squadrons, RAF Air Cadets. For voluntary service to Young People.
- Joseph Herd, Social Justice Manager, St Luke's High School, Barrhead. For services to Community Cohesion, Education and charity in East Renfrewshire.
- Hugh Mervyn Herron. For services to the Royal Scottish Pipe Band Association Northern Ireland.
- Janis Linda Hickey, Founder and lately Project Manager, The British Thyroid Foundation. For services to People Affected by Thyroid Disease.
- Debra Hicks. For services to the Promotion of Reading.
- Dr. David Hill. For services to Music.
- Mark Brian Hill. Executive Chef, House of Commons. For services to Parliament and the Catering Industry.
- Richard Paul Hill. For services to Disability Cricket.
- Audrey Joyce Hockey. For services to the community in Wallasey, Merseyside.
- John Milburn Holmes. For services to the community in Cumbria.
- Sister Lucy Helen Frances Holt, Volunteer, Bangladesh. For services to disadvantaged people in Bangladesh.
- Juliet Mary Hope, Founder and Chief Executive Officer Startup. For services to the Rehabilitation of Women Offenders and those at Risk of Offending.
- Elaine Mary Horton, President, Jalon Valley HELP, Spain. For services to British nationals in Spain.
- Maureen Horton, Community Staff Nurse, Sheffield Teaching Hospitals NHS Foundation Trust. For services to Nursing and the NHS.
- Brian Roy Hough, Lately Communications and Stakeholder Manager (Cumbria), Nuclear Decommissioning Authority. For services to the community in Cumbria and to Diabetes UK.
- Frances Julia Houghton. For services to British Rowing.
- Gayle Houstoun, Manager, National Crime Agency. For services to Preventing Organised Crime and for voluntary service.
- David Mark Hughes, Chair, The East Midlands Apprenticeship Ambassador Network. For services to Education.
- Karen Elizabeth Humphreys. For services to Music Education.
- Dr. Pauline Grace Hutchinson, Medical Director and Chair, Medcare. For services to Children in Uganda.
- Paul Anthony Irons, Chair of Governors, Fernwood School, Nottingham. For services to Education.
- Charles Edwin Irwin. For services to Beekeeping and the community in Glasgow.
- Monojaha Polly Islam. For services to charity and the UK Bangladeshi community.
- Paul Jackson, Chief Executive, Into Film. For services to Film and the Arts.
- Canon Valerie Jackson. For services to Liverpool Cathedral, Liverpool Diocese and World War One Commemoration.
- Peter Jacobs. For services to British and International Fencing.
- Helen Jenkins. For services to Triathlon.
- Patricia Margaret Jennings. For services to the community in Rutland.
- Dr. Joshua Alexander Johnson. For services to Karate and the community in Wolverhampton.
- Dr. Owen Charles Johnson, Registrar, Tree Register of the British Isles. For services to the Environment.
- Professor Stacy Dianne Johnson, Associate Professor, University of Nottingham. For services to Healthcare and Higher Education Equality, Diversity and Inclusion.
- Annabel Sarah Jones, Risk and Governance Manager, Card and Payment Team, Barclays Chief Controls Office and Wales Advisory Committee Member, Stroke Association.
- Professor Derek Kenton Jones, Director, Cardiff University Brain Imaging Research Centre. For services to Medical Imaging and the Promotion of Science Engagement.
- Anthony Stephen Joy, Senior Intelligence Analyst, Metropolitan Police Service. For services to Policing.
- Harry Edward Kane, Captain, England Football Team. For services to Football.
- Nisha Sujata Katona, Founder and Director, Mowgli Street Food Group Ltd. For services to the Food Industry.
- Karen Kaufman, Head of External Affairs, Busy Bees Childcare. For services to Children and Families.
- Mandeep Kaur, Sikh Chaplain to the Armed Forces. For voluntary services to Armed Forces Personnel and the Sikh community across the globe.
- Penelope Angela Kaye, Macmillan Specialist Dietitian, East Sussex Healthcare NHS Trust. For services to Dietetics.
- Anne Marie Kennedy. For services to the community in East Renfrewshire.
- Glen Kennett, Fiscal Crime Liaison Officer, British High Commission, Kuala Lumpur, Malaysia. For services to Her Majesty's Government overseas.
- Jeanne Olga Kenyon, Magistrate, Supplemental List. For services to the Administration of Justice.
- Ian Daniel Kerwood. For services to Sports Shooting and to charity.
- Julia Elizabeth Kett, Chairman, British Charitable Fund, Paris, France. For services to British nationals in France.
- Mohammed Muaaz Khan, Founder, Eid Unwrapped and Convenor, Public Service Youth Foundation. For services to Young People.
- Michael Paul King, Gym Manager, Sheffield Boxing Centre. For services to Disadvantaged Young People in Sheffield.
- Margaret Kitching, Chief Nurse, North Region, NHS England. For services to Nursing.
- Professor Robert Bryan Charles Kneale. For services to British Art.
- Elaine Koerner, Foster Carer, Somerset County Council. For services to Fostering.
- Professor Valsa Koshy, Emeritus Professor, Brunel University London. For services to Education.
- Jamila Kossar, Senior Leadership Team, Manchester Islamic High School for Girls and Co-founder, Manchester with the Homeless. For services to Young People.
- Albert Douglas Langston, Banker and Justice of the Peace, Gibraltar. For services to banking and lay Magistracy in Gibraltar.
- Christopher David Lawrenson, Head of Legal Services, Building Society Association. For services to Sustainability and Accountability in the Mutuals and Building Society Sectors.
- Alison Lea-Wilson. For services to Business in Wales.
- David Murray Lea-Wilson. For services to Business in Wales.
- Rosemary Frances Leech, Inspector, Police Service of Northern Ireland. For services to Policing and the community in Northern Ireland.
- Carol Anne Leeming, Poet and Playwright. For services to the Arts and Culture in Leicester.
- Steven Leigh, Head of Policy Representation, Mid Yorkshire Chamber of Commerce. For services to Local Businesses and the Economy in Yorkshire.
- Cirla Lewis. For services to Holocaust Education in the UK
- Dr. Richard John Penry Lewis DL, National Professional Lead, Primary Care, Welsh Government, NHS Wales. For services to Health Care in Wales.
- John Lammond Lindsay. For public and political service.
- Surinderpal Singh Lit. For services to the British-Asian community.
- Claire Mary Little, Programme Manager, Armed Forces Chaplaincy Centre. For services to Defence.
- Jacqueline Locke, Chief Executive, Connswater Homes. For services to Social Housing.
- Thomas Ernest Long, Principal, Orangefield Primary School. For services to Education.
- Sophie Rose Clare Lott, lately Specialist Case Worker, Forced Marriage Unit, Foreign and Commonwealth Office. For services to British Nationals overseas.
- John Lowe. For services to Darts and charity.
- Maureen Loxley, Price Integrity Operator, Tesco plc and Trade Union Representative, Usdaw. For services to the Retail Sector and to Trade Unions.
- Suzanna Elaine Lubran, Director, Newborns Vietnam. For services to reducing neo-natal mortality in Vietnam.
- Carol Ann Lyndon, Childline Counsellor, NSPCC. For services to Vulnerable Children.
- Dr. Christopher John Lynn, Archaeologist. For services to Archaeology and Heritage in Northern Ireland.
- Mary Lewis Machin, County Ambassador, Girlguiding Ross-shire. For services to Girlguiding and the community in Ross-shire.
- Duncan MacInnes. For services to the Arts and Natural Environment in Sleat, Isle of Skye.
- Sheila MacLeod. For services to charity in Inverclyde.
- Eleanor Maddocks, Chief Executive, West Lancashire Liberty Centre. For services to Victims of Domestic Violence and Abuse in West Lancashire.
- Dr. Julia Rose Magill. For services to Education.
- Helal Mahmood, For services to Community Cohesion in Oldham.
- Tariq Mahmood Dar. For services to charity and the community in Brent, London.
- Graeme Duguid Main, Photographer, Soldier Magazine. For services to Military Photography.
- Rifhat Malik. For services to Muslim Women and to charity.
- Linda Maloney. For political service.
- Alan Robert William Marsh, Fundraiser. For services to the Marine Society and Sea Cadets.
- Sylvia Doris Martin. For public and political service.
- Caroline Mary Matthews. For services to Wheelchair Basketball in the UK.
- Derek Alan May, Special Chief Inspector, Kent Police. For services to Policing and the community in Kent.
- Matthew Peter Maynard. For services to charity and Sport.
- Gareth Gerald McAuley. For services to Football in Northern Ireland.
- Victoria Jane McCarthy, Founder, Reach for Autism. For services to the Autism community in Inverclyde.
- Margaret Scott McCluskey. For services to the community in North Lanarkshire.
- Carol McDermott. For services to Young People and Diversity in Literature.
- Imelda Mary McGucken, Director, CHARIS Cancer Centre. For services to Nursing and Palliative Care in Northern Ireland.
- Michael John McHugo, Founder, Education for All, Morocco. For services to improving gender equality in education in Morocco.
- Wain Douglas McIntosh. For services to the Afro-Caribbean community in the UK and Abroad.
- Jacqueline Robertson McKelvie, Vice-Chairperson, Oak Tree Housing Association. For voluntary service to Social Housing in Inverclyde.
- Dr. Neil Edward McKittrick. For services to Humanitarianism and International Relations and the community in Northern Ireland.
- Margaret Jean Mcdonald McLellan. For services to Highland Dancing.
- Melissa Hayley Mead, National Projects Coordinator, UK Sepsis Trust. For services to Raising Awareness of Sepsis.
- Roger Terence Arthur Medwell. For services to the community in Coventry, West Midlands.
- Angela Jane Middleton, Founder and Chief Executive Officer, MiddletonMurray Group. For services to Apprenticeship Training, Youth Employment and Business.
- Helen Marion Susan Milner. For services to Education and the community in North East England.
- Jennifer Minto, Chair, Islay WW100 Group. For services to World War One Commemoration and the community in Islay, Argyll.
- Professor Stephen David Mobbs, Director, National Centre for Atmospheric Science and Professor, Atmospheric Dynamics at the University of Leeds. For services to Atmospheric Sciences.
- Kim Moloney, Honorary President, Leeds Gypsy and Traveller Exchange. For services to Gypsies and Travellers.
- Charles Richard Monks, HM Immigration Inspector, Home Office. For services to Immigration Enforcement.
- David Leonard Morgan – Volunteer Case Worker for the Bedfordshire and Cambridgeshire Rural Support Group. For services to Vulnerable People.
- Sadie Elizabeth Morgan, Desk Officer, Foreign and Commonwealth Office. For services to national security.
- Vivienne Muriel Morgan, Founder and Proprietor, Northleigh House School. For services to Education.
- Marcia Frances Morris. For services to Young People with Learning Disabilities and their Families, particularly in Aberdeenshire.
- Jennifer Margaret Mullan. For services to Scouting and to Young People in Suffolk.
- Frank Mullane, Chief Executive Officer, Advocacy After Fatal Domestic Abuse. For services to Families Affected by Domestic Homicide.
- Alan George Murray, Chief Operations Officer, Waterski and Wakeboard Scotland. For services to Water Skiing.
- Professor Doctor Zenobia Nadirshaw, Consultant Clinical Psychologist. For services to People with Learning Disabilities and Mental Health Treatment.
- Gary Newbon. For services to Media, Sport and charity.
- Richard James Nicholas, lately Travel Manager for the Foreign Secretary, Foreign and Commonwealth Office. For services to the Foreign and Commonwealth Office.
- Mary Gwynneth Nichols. For services to the community in Staffordshire.
- Wendy Jane Nicholson, National Lead Nurse for Children, Young People and Families, Public Health England. For services to Nursing for Children and Young People.
- Andrea Nixon, Lately Executive Director, Tate Liverpool. For services to the Arts.
- Peter John Leonard Nixon. For services to Conservation and the National Trust.
- Mark Norman, Outward Bound Bermuda. For services to the community in Bermuda.
- Pairic O'Brien, Housing Advisory Liaison Officer, Northern Ireland Housing Executive. For services to Occupational Therapy and Housing for People with Disabilities.
- David Oddie, Honorary Secretary and Treasurer, The Society of the Friends of St Magnus Cathedral, Orkney. For services to the community in Orkney.
- Claire Louise O'Hanlon. For services to People affected by Duchenne Muscular Dystrophy.
- Claire Marie O'Hara. For services to Canoeing.
- Pastor Adegboyega Omooba. For voluntary service.
- Roger Gordon Opie. For services to Education and the community in Bristol.
- Barry Keith Oram. For services to Young People in Kettering.
- Yvonne Armstrong Ormston, Chief Executive, North East Ambulance Service NHS Foundation Trust. For services to Healthcare in North East England.
- Jennifer Osbourne, Chief Executive Officer, Tpas. For services to Tenant Engagement.
- Ruth Oluwatosin Oshikanlu, Ambassador for the Health Visiting Profession. For services to Community Nursing, Children and Families.
- Dr. Brian John O'Toole, Nations School of Business and Management, Guyana. For services to education overseas.
- Sokeel John Park, Country Director, Liberty in North Korea. For services to UK/Korea relations.
- Diana Parkinson. For services to Women Prisoners.
- Tamsin Emma Parlour, Co-founder and Joint Chief Executive Officer, Women's Sport Trust. For services to Gender Equality in Sport.
- Bhagvati Parmar, Migration Planning Coordinator, HM Revenue and Customs. For charitable services.
- Jonathan Parsons, Investigator, Fraud Investigation Service, HM Revenue and Customs. For public service.
- Ishver Patel. For services to charity in the UK and Abroad.
- Pinakin Ishvarlal Patel, Prevent Co-ordinator and Chair, London Prevent Network. For services to Community Cohesion and Preventing Radicalisation.
- Leah Sha Pattison, Founder, Women in Need, India. For services to underprivileged women in India.
- Claire Suzanne Paul, Director, Leadership Development and New Talent, BBC. For services to Apprenticeships and Education.
- Pratap Pawar, Dancer and Choreographer. For services to Dance, Culture and community Cohesion.
- Susan Pearce, Joint Chief Executive Officer, Rape Crisis Tyneside and Northumberland. For services to Victims of Sexual Violence.
- Samantha Perahia, Head of Production UK, British Film Commission. For services to the Film and Television Industry.
- Helen Kathleen Wynter Perkins, Assistant Legal Adviser and Head of Child Safeguarding Unit, Overseas Territories Directorate, Foreign and Commonwealth Office. For services to voluntary work overseas and the Foreign and Commonwealth Office.
- Elizabeth Ann Perry, Organiser, The Innovation Project, Twynham School. For services to Children in Christchurch, Dorset.
- Benjamin James Peters, Senior Stakeholder Manager, Foreign and Commonwealth Office. For services to national security.
- Michael Leslie Peters DL. For voluntary services to Cancer Care in North Wales and Abroad.
- Keith Charles Phipps, Principal Door Keeper, House of Lords. For services to Parliament.
- David John Pike, Head of Domestic Land Transport Security, Land Transport Security Division, Department for Transport. For services to Transport Security.
- Brian Lionel Pile, Executive Director, Breadline, Moldova. For services to charity and the community in Moldova.
- Rachel Pilling, Head of Safeguarding, The Manchester College. For services to Further Education and Safeguarding.
- Michael Thomas John Ponton, Lately Community Independent Member, Hywel Dda University Health Board. For services to Healthcare.
- Dr. Judith Gwendolyn Poole, Head of Student Support and Wellbeing, Blackpool and The Fylde College. For services to Education.
- Gail Elizabeth Powell, Senior Nurse and Professional Lead for Health Visiting, Aneurin Bevan Local Health Board. For services to Health Visiting.
- Mary Frances Brenda Pugsley. For services to Disadvantaged People in Devon.
- Elizabeth Mary Brook Purcell, Chief Executive, Lewis Manning Hospice. For services to Palliative Care in Dorset.
- Louise Purser, ASYE Practice Assessor, Central Bedfordshire Council and Volunteer, British Association of Social Workers and Learn to Care. For services to Children's Social Care.
- Wilfred Pyper. For services to Musical Theatre and Drama in Northern Ireland.
- Mohammed Ridwan Ahmed Rafique, Diversity and Inclusion Manager, Immigration Enforcement, Home Office. For services to the Promotion of Inclusion in the Home Office and the community in Sandwell.
- Parul Pinky Ram, Corporate Services Manager and Vice Consul, British Embassy Pyongyang. For services to the Foreign and Commonwealth Office.
- Derek Ian Randall, Chair of Governors, Bridgwater and Taunton College. For services to Further Education.
- Craig Rankine QPM, Inspector, Police Scotland. For services to Law and Order and Young People.
- Farshid Raoufi, Station Commander, Cambridgeshire Fire and Rescue Service. For services to Equality and Inclusion.
- Mamun-Ur- Rashid. For services to Business and the community in Govan, Glasgow.
- Lyril Berisford Rawlins, Disability Employment Advisor and Coach, Selly Oak Jobcentre Plus. For services to the Department for Work and Pensions and the community in the West Midlands.
- Charles Patterson Reed. For services to disabled people in sport.
- Keri Reid, Principal Teacher and International Schools Coordinator, Muthill Primary School, Perth and Kinross. For services to Education.
- Mary Elizabeth Rennie, Chair, West Dorset, Weymouth and Portland Domestic Violence and Abuse Forum. For services to Victims of Domestic Violence and Abuse in Dorset.
- Bernard Rimmer, Estates Supervisor, Myerscough College. For services to the Agricultural community.
- Shajjad Hadier Rizvi, President, Little People Charity, Romania. For services to charity and the British business community in Romania.
- Belinda Roberts, Founder, WeDO Scotland and Managing Director, Marvellous Mustard. For services to Business and Entrepreneurship.
- Michael David Roberts, Personnel Capability Officer, Army HQ Secretariat. For services to the Army and to Gurkha Personnel and Veterans.
- Dr. Nicholas Ian Roberts, Chief Clinical Officer, South Devon and Torbay NHS Clinical Commissioning Group. For services to General Practice.
- Reynette Elizabeth Roberts. For services to the community in Cardiff.
- Victoria Nne Rodney, Community Champion, Mercy Foundation Centre. For voluntary service to the community in Battersea.
- Connor Stuart Roe, Volunteer Cave Diver. For services to cave diving overseas.
- Dean Michaêl Alexander Rogers, Payroll-giving Coordinator, Royal Naval and Royal Marines Charity. For services to Charitable Fundraising.
- Dennis Rogers, Volunteer, Groundswell. For services to Homeless People.
- Gary Dennis Rogers, Lately Policy Adviser, Cabinet Office. For public service.
- Susan Lynne Rogers, Manager, Mobility Centres of England. For services to Transport.
- Leroy Rosenior, Vice President, Show Racism The Red Card. For services to Tackling Discrimination in Sport.
- Gail Helen Rothnie, Head of Outreach, University of Birmingham. For services to Widening Participation in Higher Education.
- Mary Roulston, Lately Principal, Millennium Integrated Primary School. For services to Education.
- Anthony Brian Arthur Rowland. For services to Undertaking and the community in Surrey.
- Lucinda Rumsey, Senior Tutor, Mansfield College, University of Oxford. For services to Widening Participation in Higher Education.
- Professor Barbara Ryan, Professor of Optometry and Vision Sciences. For services to Optometry.
- Kuljit Kaur Sagoo. Chair, Home Office Gender Equality Network. For services to Diversity and Inclusion in the Home Office.
- Ruth Mary Saltmarsh. For services to the community in Exeter, Devon.
- Gladys Sangster, Chair, Cancer Research Aberdeen and North East Scotland. For services to Healthcare, Music and charity in Aberdeen.
- Lisbeth Jane Gordon Savill. For services to Film and Television.
- Peter John Scarlett, Leader, Benchmark Woodwork Project. For services to the community in Ellon, Aberdeenshire.
- Vera Helga Schaufeld. For services to Holocaust Education.
- Raymond Mark Scott, Area Manager for Yorkshire, Environment Agency. For services to the Environment.
- Susan Scurlock. Founder and Chief Executive Officer, Primary Engineer. For services to Education and Engineering.
- Tracy Selby – Lately Senior Licensing Manager, Oil and Gas Authority. For services to the Oil and Gas Industry.
- Douglas Stephen Seymour, Chair of Governors, Frank Wise School Banbury. For services to Education and the community in Oxfordshire and North Devon.
- Wahida Shaffi. For services to Women, Young People, Interfaith and Community Relations.
- Williamina Shalliday, Director, Business Development, Drummond International. For services to WW100 Scotland Commemorations.
- Sheila Elizabeth Simons, Social Work Manager, South Eastern Health and Social Care Trust. For services to Social Care and Protection of Women and Children.
- Gary Antonio Sinclair, Head Porter, Foreign and Commonwealth Office. For services to the Foreign and Commonwealth Office.
- Gerard Skelton. For services to Young People and community cohesion in Northern Ireland.
- Robert Forbes Skilling, Clerk of Works, FCO Services. For services to the Foreign and Commonwealth Office.
- Elisabeth Mary Skinner, Academic Leader, Society of Local Council Clerks. For services to Parish Councils.
- Heather Carolyn Smart, Firefighter, Northern Ireland Fire and Rescue Service. For services to the Advancement of Women in the Fire and Rescue Service.
- Raymond Smiles. For services to Football and Young People in Wales.
- Judith Marion Smith. For services to charity and the Occupational Benevolence Sector.
- Lesley Carol Smith. Emergency Response Volunteer, British Red Cross. For voluntary service to the Red Cross.
- Deborah Louise Soave, Neurological Physiotherapist, East Sussex Healthcare NHS Trust. For services to Long-Term Conditions.
- Iain Spence, Ministry of Defence. For services to Defence.
- Finlay Spratt, Catering Officer, Northern Ireland Prison Service. For public service and charity.
- Victoria Helena Stanger, Deputy Head Department for International Development, South Sudan. For services to International Development.
- Stefanie Katherine Stead, Regional Chair, Yorkshire and Humber Construction Industry Council and Principal, Stead & Co. For services to Architecture and the Construction Industry.
- Professor Jacqueline Stevenson, Sociologist and Head of Research, Sheffield Institute of Education, Sheffield Hallam University. For services to Education.
- Sheila Stone, Operations Manager and Project Lead, Border Force, Home Office. For services to Border Security.
- Alan John Stoyel. For services to Water Mill Heritage.
- Brian John Sullivan, Head of Contingency Planning and Security, Department for Environment, Food and Rural Affairs. For services to Emergency Planning and Management.
- Professor Arthur Quentin Summerfield, Professor of Psychology, University of York. For services to Psychology and People with Hearing Loss.
- Ian Swift, Head of Housing Solutions, Southwark Council. For services to Homeless People.
- Dr. Nigel Philip Sykes, Lately Medical Director, St Christopher's Hospice, London. For services to Palliative Care.
- Nicola Kathryn Symmons, Headteacher, Heol Goffa School, Llanelli. For services to Education.
- Yusuf Mehmood Tai, Co-founder, Public Service Youth Foundation and Co-founder, Manchester with the Homeless. For services to Young People in Manchester.
- Balraj Tandon. For services to Business and the community in South London.
- Daniel Lloyd Taylor. For services to Business Design and Workplace Diversity.
- Mandy Terrell, Foster Carer, Plymouth City Council. For services to Fostering.
- Michael Terrell, Foster Carer, Plymouth City Council. For services to Fostering.
- Jonathan Mark Terry, Lately, Founder and Adviser, The Cystinosis Foundation UK. For services to People with Cystinosis and their Families.
- Adam Charles Thomas, Senior Press Officer and Spokesman, Defence and Security Organisation Events Team, Department for International Trade. For services to UK Defence and Security Industry.
- Angela Thompson, Director of Nursing and Deputy Regional Chief Nurse, London, NHS Improvement. For services to Nursing and Healthcare Leadership.
- James Alexander Threlfall. For services to Young People in Wiltshire.
- Peter John Tofani, Logistics Planning Manager, FCO Services. For services to the Foreign and Commonwealth Office.
- Leslie Tomlinson. For services to Boxing and Young People in Sheffield.
- Helen Mary Townend, Chair, Army Widows Association. For services to Service Widows and Widowers.
- Moira Lynn Tracey, Exchequer Forecast Manager, HM Treasury. For public and voluntary service and services to the Exchequer.
- James Traynor, Senior Officer, Child Exploitation and Online Protection, National Crime Agency. For services to Law Enforcement.
- Chandra Mohan Trikha, Lately Director of Distribution Performance, SSE. For services to the Energy Industry.
- Ann Madge Turner, Lately Principal and Chief Executive Officer, Myerscough College. For services to Land Based Education and Training.
- Claire Louise Turnham, Founder, Victim of Viagogo. For services to Consumer Rights.
- Jacqueline Elizabeth Tyler. For services to Music and Music Education in Birmingham.
- Vernon Harry Unsworth, Volunteer Cave Diver. For services to cave diving overseas.
- Faeeza Vaid, Executive Director Muslim Women's Network UK. For services to Women's Rights.
- Eileen Ann Vassie, Governor, Chelsfield Primary School. For services to Education.
- Councillor Rhydian Peter Vaughan. For public and political service.
- Steven Vear JP. For voluntary service in Hampshire.
- Jashu Vekaria, Deputy Headteacher, Uxendon Manor Primary School. For services to Primary Education.
- Esther Vitte, Work Coach, Work Services Directorate, Department for Work and Pensions. For services to Vulnerable Customers in South London.
- Andrew Raymond Walker. For services to People with Disabilities.
- Barbara Walker. For services to British Art.
- Louise Walker, Head of Social Work and Professional Standards, Redcar and Cleveland Borough Council. For services to Adult and Children's Social Care.
- Vivien Rosemary Lumsdaine Wallace Coleman. For services to the Theatre, Arts Education and the community in London.
- Mark Ronan Walmsley, lately Head of Disability Policy, Foreign and Commonwealth Office. For services to the Foreign and Commonwealth Office.
- Jocelyn Walters, Research Delivery Manager, University Hospital Southampton and Founding Member, National Cancer Research Network. For services to Cancer Research.
- Joy Warmington, Chief Executive Officer, BRAP and Vice Chair, Birmingham and Solihull Mental Health NHS Trust. For services to Healthcare and the community in the West Midlands.
- Neil Patrick Ross William Warnock. For services to Music and charity.
- Helen Jean Wathall, Managing Director, G Wathall and Son Ltd Funeral Directors. For services to Business and the community in Derbyshire.
- David Gareth Watts, Business Analyst, Intellectual Property Office. For services to the Economy, charity and Mental Health Services.
- Susan Webster, Volunteer Branch Chair, Royal National Lifeboat Institution. For services to charity.
- Elizabeth Ann Weir. For services to the Arts and Education.
- Jacqueline Weir. For services to the community in North Belfast.
- Rosalind Jane Westwood. For services to Museums and Culture in the East Midlands.
- Jane Whinnett, Chair, Nursery Head Teacher Council. For services to Early Childhood Education.
- Sheila Elizabeth Rose White, Community Learning and Development Manager, Glasgow Clyde College. For services to Community Learning and Development.
- Raye Belford Wilkinson. For services to Young People and Elderly Staff in the Horse Racing Community.
- Joan Marie Wilson, Foster Carer, Lambeth Council. For services to Fostering.
- Michael James Winfield, Chief Executive Officer, Americas Cup Bermuda. For services to Bermuda.
- Colin Duncan Wood, Foster Carer, Derbyshire City Council. For services to Fostering.
- Helen Susan Wood, Foster Carer, Derbyshire City Council. For services to Fostering.
- William Ian Woolley. For services to the community in Blackburn and Darwen.
- Duncan Edward Worsell, Chief Superintendent, Civil Nuclear Constabulary. For services to the Civil Nuclear Industry.
- Candida Jane Wright, President, HELP Denia and Marina Alta, Spain. For services to British nationals in Spain.
- Rosemary Wright, Superintendent, Local Policing Development and Support, Police Scotland. For services to Mental Health Issues.
- Elaine Wyllie, Founder, The Daily Mile. For services to the Fitness of Children.
- Timothy Christopher Yealland, Head of Education, English Touring Opera. For services to the Arts and to Music Education for Young People.
- Anita Margaret Young. For services to Classical Ballet and Dance Education.
- Benjamin Paul Young, Managing Director, SYM Superyacht Management, France. For services to charity.
- Andria Zafirakou, Associate Deputy Head, Alperton Community School. For services to Education and Young People in Brent.
- Dr. Xiaojiu Zhu. Founder and Chair, UK Society of Chinese Lawyers. For services to Law and the Chinese community.

=== Royal Red Cross ===
==== Members of the Royal Red Cross (RRC) ====
- Lieutenant Colonel Jayne Elizabeth Cumming – Queen Alexandra's Royal Army Nursing Corps

==== Associate of the Royal Red Cross (ARRC) ====
- Sergeant Colodia Sukali Muzvidziwa – Queen Alexandra's Royal Army Nursing Corps

=== George Medal ===
- Richard Stanton, MBE – Thai cave rescue, 26 June–11 July 2018
- John Volanthen – Thai cave rescue, 26 June–11 July 2018

=== The Queen's Gallantry Medal ===
- Christopher Jewell – Thai cave rescue, 26 June–11 July 2018
- Jason Mallinson – Thai cave rescue, 26 June–11 July 2018
- Firefighter Wayne Ansell, Hertfordshire Fire and Rescue Service – For rescuing elderly residents of a care home in Cheshunt, 8 April 2017
- Firefighter Simon Best, Hertfordshire Fire and Rescue Service – For rescuing elderly residents of a care home in Cheshunt, 8 April 2017
- Crew Commander Daniel Cooper, Hertfordshire Fire and Rescue Service – For rescuing elderly residents of a care home in Cheshunt, 8 April 2017
- Firefighter Ricky Davis, Hertfordshire Fire and Rescue Service – For rescuing elderly residents of a care home in Cheshunt, 8 April 2017
- Firefighter Christopher Meadows, Hertfordshire Fire and Rescue Service – For rescuing elderly residents of a care home in Cheshunt, 8 April 2017
- Firefighter Radosław Przemysław Pejka, Hertfordshire Fire and Rescue Service – For rescuing elderly residents of a care home in Cheshunt, 8 April 2017
- Simon Waddingham, Firefighter, Hertfordshire Fire and Rescue Service – For rescuing elderly residents of a care home in Cheshunt, 8 April 2017

=== British Empire Medal (BEM) ===
- Anne Patricia Abel – Superintendent, Harlesden Unit, St John Ambulance. For voluntary service to First Aid Training in London.
- Stephen Addison – Founder, Box Up Crime. For services to Young People in the London Borough of Barking and Dagenham.
- Fiona Alderson – Technical Services Manager, School of Engineering, The University of Edinburgh. For services to Engineering and to Education.
- Susan Elizabeth Mary Allen – For voluntary service to the community in Heath Town, Wolverhampton.
- Carol Linda Gordon-Alleyne – Horticultural Therapist, Defence Medical Rehabilitation Centre, Headley Court. For services to Rehabilitation and to Injured Service Personnel.
- James Anderson – Buildings Supervisor, Omagh County Primary School. For services to Education.
- Susan Anderson – Convenor, Highland and Moray Children's Panel. For services to the Children's Hearing System in Scotland.
- Michael Andrea – Founder, Global Generation Church. For services to Social Empowerment in Thanet, Kent.
- Ian Anstice – For services to the Public Libraries Sector.
- Helena Stella Aronson – For services to Holocaust Education.
- Ida Ashworth – For services to the community in Oldham.
- Elizabeth Ann Asprey – For services to the Museums in Saltash and South East Cornwall.
- Nicholas Austin – For political service.
- Kenneth Avery – Special Inspector, Hampshire Constabulary. For services to Policing and the community in Hampshire and the Isle of Wight.
- Ashkhen Andrea Aviet – Campaigner against Domestic Abuse. For services to Victims of Domestic Abuse.
- Bisoye Babalola – Founder and Chief Executive Officer, Nights Global. For services to the Creative Industries.
- Elizabeth Helen Bainbridge – Consultant Nurse, Lincolnshire Partnership NHS Foundation Trust. For services to Nursing and Vulnerable People.
- Neil Franklin Baldwin – For services to the community in Newcastle-Under-Lyme, Staffordshire
- Janice Ball – For services to Music.
- Geoffrey John Banks – For services to the community in Cowes.
- Susan Elizabeth Barratt – Lately Governor, Castle Hill High School. For services to Education.
- Barbara Elizabeth Bartlett – For services to the community in Chipping Warden, Northamptonshire.
- Ellen Dorothy Bassett – For services to Sport and the community in Westoning, Bedfordshire.
- Stephen John Baxter – For services to Football in Northern Ireland.
- Lisa Jane Beaumont – Therapeutic and Specialist Play Manager, Leeds Teaching Hospitals NHS Trust. For services to the British and World Transplant Games.
- Sharon Beckett – Chief Executive, Sight Cymru. For services to Blind and Partially Sighted People in South Wales.
- Eithne Marian Begley – Deputy Catering Manager, Youth Justice Agency, Northern Ireland Executive. For services to the Youth Justice System and Young People in Custody.
- Alan Geoffrey Bell – For services to Flood Risk Management in Morpeth, Northumberland.
- Nerys Bell – HIVE Information Officer, RAF Henlow. For services to RAF Personnel and their Families.
- Sally Ann Bendall – For services to the Agricultural Sector.
- Alison Jane Bennett – For services to the community in Bere Regis, Dorset.
- Evelyn Elizabeth Bennett – Volunteer Fundraising Branch Chair, Donaghadee, Royal National Lifeboat Institution. For services to charity.
- Allan Beveridge – For voluntary service to the community in Peebles.
- Taube Biber – For services to Holocaust Education.
- Henry Birch – For services to the Church and the community in Halewood Village, Liverpool.
- Gillian Sara Birks – For services to the community in Glusburn, North Yorkshire.
- Adam Black– Equality and Diversity Champion, Glasgow Education Services. For services to Raising Awareness of Stammering.
- Terence John Blunden – For services to the community in Newport, Isle of Wight.
- Clive Boursnell – For services to Photography.
- William Edward Bowen – For services to the community in Oswestry.
- Norma Ann Boyd – For services to the community in Northfield, Birmingham.
- Ann Bramley – Reading Champion, Western Community Primary School, Wallsend. For services to the community in Wallsend.
- Dorothy Brierley – Vice Chairman, Rochdale Childer. For services to Children in the Metropolitan Borough of Rochdale.
- Peter Graham Brinsden – For services to the community in Farnham, Surrey.
- Dr Edwina Brocklesby – For services to the Health and Wellbeing of Older People.
- Colin Andrew Webster Brown – Depute Provost, Angus. For services to Local Government, Sport and the community in Angus.
- David Brown – For services to the community in Matlock and Bakewell, Derbyshire.
- Kate Brown – For services to the community in Manchester.
- Keith Alan Brown – For services to the community in Billingshurst, West Sussex.
- Lewis Thomas Brown – Police Community Support Officer, British Transport Police. For services to Policing.
- Margaret Wilson Brown – For services to Young People in Ballymena.
- Tony Martin Brown – For services to Libraries.
- Richard Anthony Burford – For services to Veterans and the community in Surrey.
- Andrew Robert John Burns – Street Chaplain. For voluntary service in Dundee.
- Francis Edmund Burroughes – For services to the community in Lufton, Somerset.
- Jean Ann Burt – For services to the community in Wallingford, Oxfordshire.
- Pamela Grace Morgan, For services to Open Water and Disabled Swimming.
- David Norman Turnbull – For voluntary service to the community in Peebles.
- Peter Wynne-Thomas, author, historian and statistician for services to cricket.

=== Queen's Police Medal (QPM) ===
Ribbon bar of the Queen's Police Medal for Distinguished Service

- Constable Caroline Elaine Adams – Sussex Police.
- Constable Tim Andrews – Metropolitan Police Service.
- Constable Sam Balfour – Metropolitan Police Service.
- Detective Superintendent Sara Buchanan – Police Service of Scotland.
- Constable Michael Buckley – Greater Manchester Police.
- Constable Jessica Bullough – British Transport Police.
- Constable Nick Carlisle – Metropolitan Police Service.
- Detective Superintendent John Brian Crossley – Metropolitan Police Service.
- Chief Superintendent Belinda Jane Davies – South Wales Police.
- Lately Inspector Terence Finn – Greater Manchester Police.
- Constable Liam Fitzpatrick – Police Service of Scotland.
- Lately Assistant Chief Constable Nicola Holland – Merseyside Police.
- Detective Constable Jonathan Hook – Avon and Somerset Constabulary.
- Lately Sergeant Leslie Ronald Jackson – Metropolitan Police Service.
- Temporary Detective Chief Superintendent Neil Malkin – Durham Constabulary.
- Inspector Mustafa Muhammed – West Midlands Police.
- Lately Assistant Chief Constable (Commander) Teresa Jane Nicholson – Metropolitan Police Service.
- Constable Iian Rae – Metropolitan Police Service.
- Lately Chief Superintendent Alison Jane Roden – Kent Police.
- Chief Constable Shaun Sawyer – Devon and Cornwall Police.
- Inspector Dale Sexton – Greater Manchester Police.
- Assistant Chief Constable Christopher Shead – National Police Co-ordination Centre.
- Lately Detective Constable Graham Harold Spencer – Humberside Police.
- Constable Philip Jeffrey Stone – Metropolitan Police Service.
- Lately Detective Sergeant Janine Sullivan – West Yorkshire Police.
- Constable Bartosz Tchorzewski – Metropolitan Police Service.
- Assistant Chief Constable Nelson Telfer – Police Service of Scotland.
- Chief Constable James Ronald Vaughan – Dorset Police.
- Inspector Amanda Williams – Gwent Police.
- Detective Inspector Billy Cross – Police Service of Northern Ireland
- Superintendent Brian Thomas Kee – Police Service of Northern Ireland
- Detective Constable Kimberly Hegarty – Police Service of Northern Ireland
- Chief Superintendent Richard Alfred Mifsud – Royal Gibraltar Police

=== Queen's Fire Service Medal (QFSM) ===
Ribbon bar of the Queen's Fire Service Medal for Distinguished Service

- Deputy Chief Fire Officer Andrew Shaun Bowers – Hampshire Fire and Rescue Service.
- Lately Watch Manager Thomas Clive Johnson – Cumbria Fire and Rescue Service.
- Firefighter Thomas Richardson – Tyne and Wear Fire and Rescue Service.
- Firefighter Kevin Neil Taylor – Hampshire Fire and Rescue Service.
- Group Manager Brenda Gillan – Scottish Fire and Rescue Service.
- Community Firefighter Kevin Phillip – Scottish Fire and Rescue Service.

=== Queen's Ambulance Service Medal (QAM) ===
Ribbon bar of the Queen's Ambulance Service Medal for Distinguished Service

- Pauline Karen Cranmer – Deputy Director of Operations, London Ambulance Service.
- Robert Jeffrey Steven Horton – Responder Manager / Paramedic, South West Ambulance Service.
- Gregory Charles Lloyd – Head of Clinical Services, Welsh Ambulance Services NHS Trust.
- Gillian Pleming – Utilisation Manager, Welsh Ambulance Services NHS Trust.
- Paul Gowend – Lead Consultant Paramedic, Scottish Ambulance Service.

=== Queen's Volunteer Reserves Medal (QVRM) ===
Ribbon bar of the Queen's Volunteer Reserves Medal

- Chief Petty Officer Aircrewman Andrew Stephen Vanes – Royal Naval Reserve, D975605V.
- Warrant Officer Class 2 Simon James Coulson, VR – The Mercian Regiment, Army Reserve, 24847442.
- Brigadier Peter Huw Gilbert, TD, VR, DL – Army Reserve, 508396.
- Warrant Officer Class 2 Michael James Guest, VR – The Royal Logistic Corps, Army Reserve, 24731440.
- Major Iain McLean Macdonald, VR – The Royal Logistic Corps, Army Reserve, 24739039.
- Captain Tony Timothy O'Hara, VR – General List, Army Reserve, 24622554.
- Wing Commander Kayode Oludaisi Adesegun Adeboye – Royal Air Force, 0091511H.
- Flight Lieutenant Jane Tasmin Cowling – Royal Air Force, 2639453F.

=== Overseas Territories Police Medal (OTPM) ===
Ribbon bar of the Overseas Territories Police Medal for Meritorious Service

- Superintendent Richard Mark Ulliger – Royal Gibraltar Police.

=== The Queen's Commendation for Bravery ===
- Joe Rowlands – For rescuing his father from drowning, 22 February 2018

== Crown Dependencies ==
Guernsey

- Adrian Le Page MBE for services to rugby in Guernsey.
- Patricia Holland BEM for charitable services to Guernsey and Romania.

Jersey

- David Cabeldu MBE for services to the preservation of Jersey's heritage and environment.
- Eileen Smith BEM for services to Parkinson's Jersey.

Isle of Man

- David Doyle CBE For Outstanding Services to Manx Law
- Stewart Clague MBE For outstanding contribution to the Isle of Man and the Lonan and Laxey Community
- Mary Christian Bridson – Personnel Officer, St John Ambulance. BEM For voluntary service to St John Ambulance on the Isle of Man.
- Martin Benson BEM For outstanding and continuing public service

== Barbados ==
Below are the individuals appointed by Elizabeth II in her right as Queen of Barbados, on advice of Her Majesty's Barbados Ministers.

=== Knight Bachelor ===
- Assad John Haloute – For services to the hospitality industry and philanthropy.

=== The Most Distinguished Order of Saint Michael and Saint George ===
==== Knights Commander of the Order of St Michael and St George (KCMG / DCMG) ====
- Elliott Deighton Mottley QC – For service to the legal profession, to the diplomatic service and to the community.

=== The Most Excellent Order of the British Empire ===
==== Commander of the Order of the British Empire (CBE) ====
- Dr. Frances Louise Chandler OBE – For services to agriculture and sustainable development.

==== Officer of the Order of the British Empire (OBE) ====
- Cynthia Joan Williams – For services to nursing and to the community.

==== Member of the Order of the British Empire (MBE) ====
- Reverend Hughson Carlos Inniss – For services to youth empowerment and to the fight against HIV/AIDS.
- John Wayne Anderson Watts – For services to environmental health.

== The Bahamas ==
Below are the individuals appointed by Elizabeth II in her right as Queen of The Bahamas, on advice of Her Majesty's Ministers in The Bahamas.

=== The Most Distinguished Order of Saint Michael and Saint George ===
==== Companion of the Order of St Michael and St George (CMG) ====
- Camille Faye Johnson – For outstanding services to education and to public service.

=== The Most Excellent Order of the British Empire ===
==== Dame Commander of the Order of the British Empire (DBE) ====
- The Hon Janet Gwennett Bostwick – For services to politics.

==== Officer of the Order of the British Empire (OBE) ====
- Reverend Monsignor Alfred Cedric Culmer – For services to religion.
- Reginald Ferguson QPM – For services to the Civil Service.
- Leon Wallace, Chief Apostle – For services to religion and to the community.

=== British Empire Medal (BEM) ===
- Jason Harrison Hanna – For services to business and the community.
- Nicole Martin – For services to industry.
- Alfred Kenneth Russell – For services to politics and to business.

== Grenada ==
Below are the individuals appointed by Elizabeth II in her right as Queen of Grenada, on advice of Her Majesty's Grenada Ministers.

=== The Most Distinguished Order of Saint Michael and Saint George ===
==== Knight Commander of the Order of St Michael and St George (KCMG) ====
- Walter St. John OBE – For services to sport.

=== The Most Excellent Order of the British Empire ===
==== Officer of the Order of the British Empire (OBE) ====
- Osmond Stanley Griffith – For service to policing and to international affairs.

==== Member of the Order of the British Empire (MBE) ====
- Theresa Marryshow – For services to farming.
- Lurine Ingrid Morain – For service to the community.

=== British Empire Medal (BEM) ===
- Oscar Andall – For service to sport.
- James Stafford – For service to culture.

== Solomon Islands ==
Below are the individuals appointed by Elizabeth II in her right as Queen of the Solomon Islands, on advice of Her Majesty's Solomon Island Ministers.

=== The Most Excellent Order of the British Empire ===
==== Knight Commander of the Order of the British Empire (KBE) ====
- Reverend Leslie Tanaboe Boseto – For services to the Church, rural and community development.

==== Officer of the Order of the British Empire (OBE) ====
- Stephen Frank Abaita – For services to policing and to community development.
- Daniel Kipili – For services to education and to community development.

==== Member of the Order of the British Empire (MBE) ====
- Martha Bumai Horiwapu – For services to rural and community development.
- Raphael Solfa Toitani – For services to teaching, the Church and to community development.
- Wilson Wilikai Waleualo – For services to civil aviation and to community development.

=== British Empire Medal (BEM) ===
- Cherry Karoso Galokepoto – For services to education and to community development.
- Nester Koloni – For services to the Royal Solomon Islands Police Force.
- Father Devine Kabau Maekai – For services to policing, the Church and to community development.
- Peter Safue – For services to education and to community development.

=== Queen's Police Medal (QPM) ===
- Richard Menapi – For services to the Royal Solomon Islands Police Force.

== Tuvalu ==
Below are the individuals appointed by Elizabeth II in her right as Queen of Tuvalu, on advice of Her Majesty's Tuvalu Ministers.

=== The Most Excellent Order of the British Empire ===
==== Officer of the Order of the British Empire (OBE) ====
- His Excellency Mr. Minute Alapati Taupo – For contribution to public services.

==== Member of the Order of the British Empire (MBE) ====
- David Manuvasa Manuella – For services to education.
- Katalina Pasiale Taloka – For services to education.
- Dr. Kaiva Tulimanu – For services to medicine.

=== British Empire Medal (BEM) ===
- Seti Safega – For services to sport.

== Saint Lucia ==
Below are the individuals appointed by Elizabeth II in her right as Queen of Saint Lucia, on advice of Her Majesty's Saint Lucia Ministers.

=== The Most Distinguished Order of Saint Michael and Saint George ===
==== Knight Commander of the Order of St Michael and St George (KCMG) ====
- Michael Thomas Chastanet CMG OBE – For services to business, commerce, tourism and National Development.

== Saint Vincent and the Grenadines ==
Below are the individuals appointed by Elizabeth II in her right as Queen of Saint Vincent and the Grenadines, on advice of Her Majesty's Vincentian Ministers.

=== The Most Distinguished Order of Saint Michael and Saint George ===
==== Knight Commander of the Order of St Michael and St George (KCMG) ====
- Dr. Arthur Cecil Cyrus CMG OBE – For services to medicine and to health services.

==== Companion of the Order of St Michael and St George (CMG) ====
- Girlyn Miguel – For services to politics, education, community and to women's empowerment.

=== The Most Excellent Order of the British Empire ===
==== Officer of the Order of the British Empire (OBE) ====
- Corsel Cassandra Robertson – For services to civil aviation.
- Derry Travis Williams – For services to banking and to the financial sector.

==== Member of the Order of the British Empire (MBE) ====
- Robert Balcombe – For services to agriculture.
- Molly Aliena Baptiste – For services to industry and to commerce.
- Sherron Jocynthia Morgan-Peters – For services to education and to community work.

== Antigua and Barbuda ==
Below are the individuals appointed by Elizabeth II in her right as Queen of Antigua and Barbuda, on advice of Her Majesty's Ministers in Antigua and Barbuda.

=== The Most Excellent Order of the British Empire ===
==== Commander of the Order of the British Empire (CBE) ====
- Dr. Margaret O'Garra – For services to healthcare

==== Member of the Order of the British Empire (MBE) ====
- Lila Elizabeth Loretta Simon – For services to the community and to youth development.

== Canada ==
2019 New Year Honours (Canada)
