= Anne Carlile =

Anne Carlile may refer to:

- Joan Carlile (c. 1606–1679), English portrait painter, sometimes mistakenly called Anne
- Anne Jane Carlile (1775–1864), Irish temperance pioneer and philanthropist

== See also ==
- Anne Carlisle (born 1956), American artist
- Anne Carlisle (professor) (born 1956), British educator.
