= Louise Robinson =

British medical doctor and academic

Dame Ann Louise Robinson DBE is a British medical doctor and academic. She is Regius Professor of Ageing at Newcastle University, and director of the Newcastle University Institute for Ageing.

Robinson earned an MBBS in 1985 from Newcastle University, MRCGP in 1989, DFFP in 1991, DCH in 1998 from the University of London, and Dip ME 1992 from the University of Dundee.

Robinson trained as a GP in rural Northumberland.

In the 2019 New Year Honours, Robinson was awarded DBE, "For services to Primary Care". For her work on the care of dementia, she was awarded a Research Professorship at the National Institute for Health Research (NIHR).
