= William Henry Smith School =

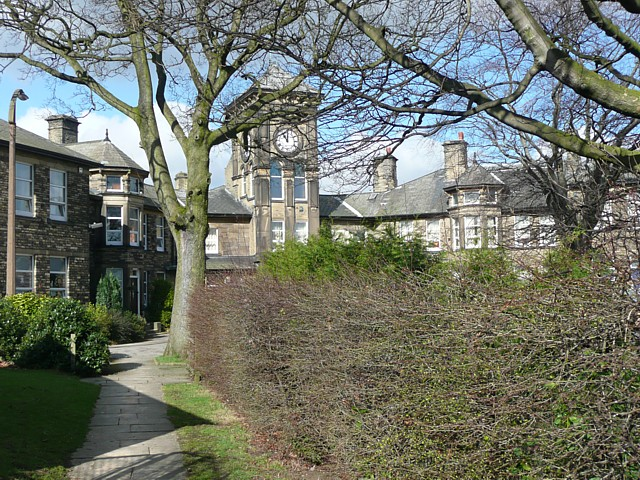
- School buildings

Location
- Boothroyd; Brighouse, West Yorkshire, HD6 3JW; England; 53°41′36″N 1°48′13″W

Information
- Motto: BECOMING THE BEST YOU CAN BE
- Established: 1961
- Founder: William Smith
- Department for Education URN: 107589 Tables
- Ofsted: Reports
- Incumbent Headteacher: Sue Ackroyd
- Previous Headteacher: Brendan Heneghan
- Head of Care: Damien Talbot
- Staff: 52 full time & 31 part time
- Gender: Boys
- Age: 8 to 16
- Enrolment: 64
- Houses: Lowry, Mozart, Bronte, Churchill and Mandela
- Colours: Maroon, Light blue & Black
- Website: http://www.whsschool.org.uk/

The William Henry Smith School is a non-maintained residential school, located on the outskirts of Brighouse in West Yorkshire, England. It provides education and care for boys with social, emotional and behavioural difficulties (SEBD).

The school has a total of 64 pupils, of which there are 56 weekly boarding pupils and 8 day pupils. It is controlled by a board of fifteen governors, and has 52 full time and 31 part time members of staff.

Set in the Boothroyd Estate, the school has facilities for indoor and outdoor sporting activities, such as an adventure playground, all weather sports enclosure and indoor sports hall and gym.

== History ==
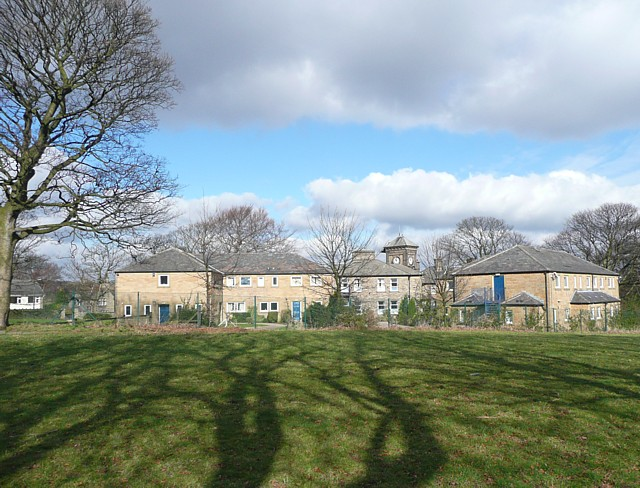
Recent additions to the school buildings

The earliest record of a building at Boothroyd was in 1272. The present house was originally built around 1850 as a family residence. During the First World War, it was used as a war hospital, which between 1916 and 1919 treated 1,975 patients.

William Smith, the first mayor of Brighouse, created the Smith Foundation Trust in 1916 and bought the Boothroyd Estate to set up as an orphanage. In 1919, the Boothroyd buildings were handed over to the Trustees, and was opened on 31 July 1920 as an orphanage for girls, but soon admitted boys. On William Smith's death in 1922, he left the bulk of his estate to the Trust; money that would have gone to his cousin’s son William Henry Smith, who was killed in Action during the First World War.

After the Second World War, the Trustees were forced to reconsider the role of the Trust. In 1951, a scheme was devised to convert the orphanage into a special school. The last of the children from the orphanage left in 1959 and in September 1961 a residential special school for boys, named after William Henry Smith, was established on the site by the Trust.
