= Willie Hamilton (doctor) =

Professor Willie Hamilton CBE FRCP FRCGP
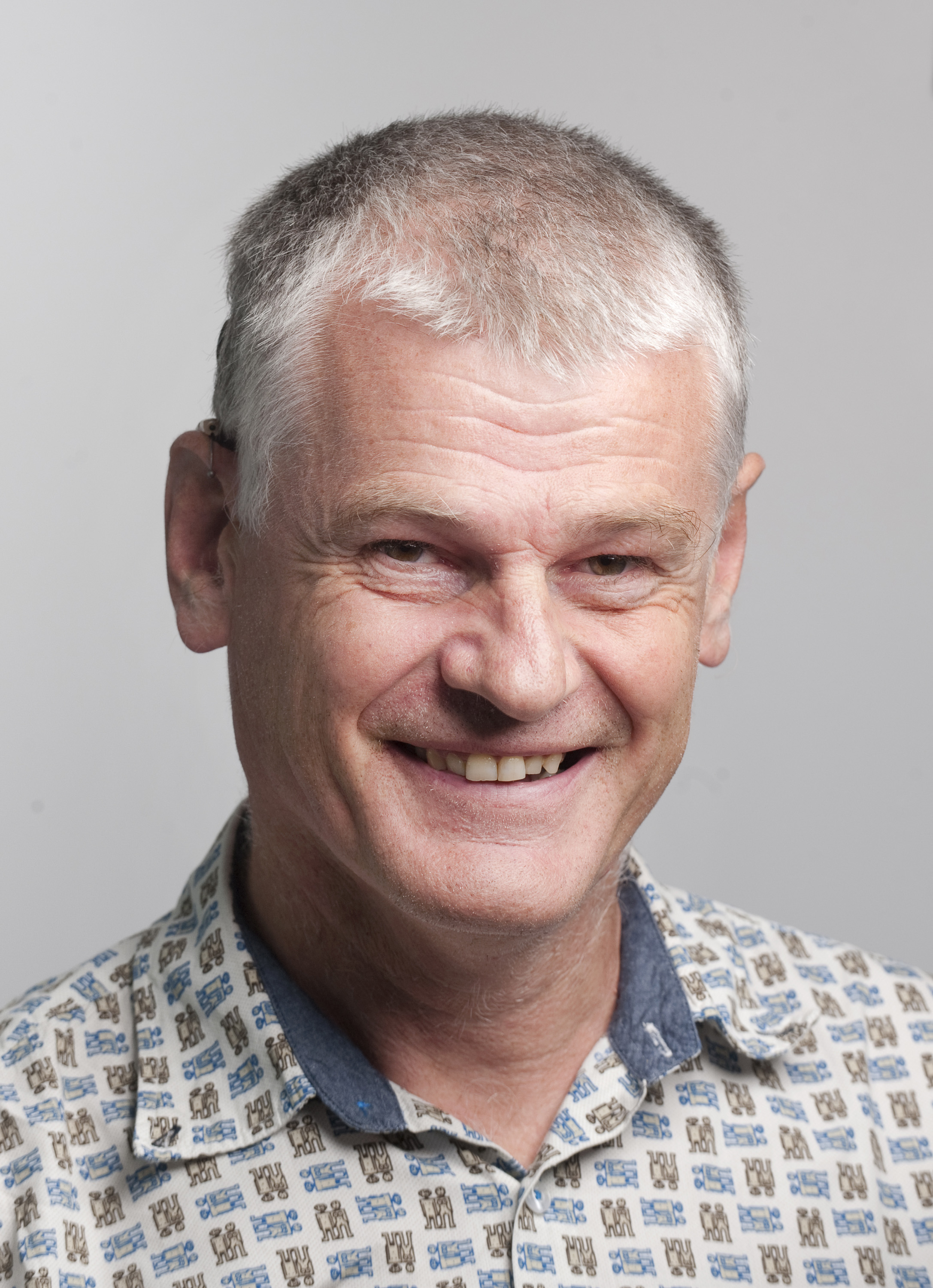
- Willie Hamilton (academic) profile photo
- Born: May 1958 (age 67)
- Occupation: Professor of primary care diagnostics
- Awards: CBE

Academic background
- Education: MD
- Alma mater: University of Bristol
- Thesis: Earlier diagnosis of colorectal, lung and prostate cancer (2005)

William Trevor Hamilton (born 1958) is a British expert in cancer diagnosis. He is professor of primary care diagnostics at the University of Exeter.

He specialises in primary care diagnostics, with particular expertise in cancer.

== Early life and education ==
Hamilton was born in 1958 in Belfast. He moved to England to study medicine at the University of Bristol, qualifying in 1982, having added an intercalated degree in Medical Microbiology in 1979. Following this, general medical training and 2.5 years as a physician in Malawi, he trained to become a general practitioner in 1989. Hamilton became a member of the Royal College of Physicians (RCP) of the United Kingdom in 1986 and the Royal College of General Practitioners (RCGP) in 1989. In 2001, Hamilton was forced to take a break from his career in general practice due to an infected cochlear implant and began full-time research. He was awarded Fellowship of the RCGP in 2002 and a year later, in 2003, received Fellowship of the RCP. He also received a Doctor of Medicine degree in 2005 from the University of Bristol, with his thesis title of 'Earlier diagnosis of colorectal, lung and prostate cancer'.

== Career and scholarly positions ==
In 1990, Hamilton moved to Exeter to pursue a career as a GP, joining Barnfield Hill Surgery. He practised here for 10 years, when he took a break from working when his cochlear implant became infected, leaving him with insufficient hearing to practice medicine safely.

During the enforced break he obtained a doctoral fellowship at the National Institute for Health Research (NIHR), plus a RCGP fellowship, allowing him to study full-time for his MD at University of Bristol. From 2007 to 2010, Hamilton served as a Consultant Senior Lecturer in the Department of Community Based Medicine at the University of Bristol.

Hamilton became Chief Medical Officer for Liverpool Victoria Friendly Society in 2000 and for The Exeter in 2003, both mutual insurance companies. He later became executive director of The Exeter, a post he still holds.

He returned to practice as a GP in 2006 at Mount Pleasant Health Centre in Exeter after successful re-implantation.

In 2010, Hamilton took up his current role as professor of primary care diagnostics at the University of Exeter Medical School. Since then he has been responsible for leading research into creating resources for GPs to identify patients who may have any of the 19 main cancers, using their symptoms. He was also clinical lead of the NICE, 'Referral for Suspected Cancer' NG12, published in 2015. 100 of the 210 recommendations in this guidance can be linked back to Hamilton's research.

Hamilton also created the cancer 'Risk Assessment Tools' or 'RATs' for short. This research identified and quantified the risk of symptoms that were linked to 15 different cancers. This included the discovery that a sore throat is a feature of larynx cancer. Risk Assessment Tools have been part of the effort to increase diagnosis of cancer in the UK.

A study in BJGP has concluded that the uptake of Risk Assessment Tools have been shown that these aren't being used as much as initially anticipated, however, a large study is due to take shape during the second half of 2019 with the aim that there will be a new uptake of these tools to diagnose cancer

Through the course of his career, Hamilton has published over 250 papers. He has won RCGP Research paper of the year overall twice and has received more than 40 research grants, totalling over £20m

== CBE ==
For his work towards cancer diagnosis, Hamilton was awarded a CBE in the 2019 New Year's Honours List. He collected his award at Buckingham Palace 7 March 2019.

== Personal life ==
=== Northern Ireland ===
Originally from Belfast, Northern Ireland, he has competed in two different disciplines for his country.

During the 1970s and 1980s, Hamilton fenced internationally for Northern Ireland.

More recently, he competed in Bridge for Northern Ireland, alongside his brother Ian in the Camrose Trophy. They were selected to represent Northern Ireland on two occasions in 2010 and 2011 with England and Wales winning in respective years.

=== Hearing ===
During his teens, Hamilton started losing his hearing and was profoundly deaf by the age of 30, after which he wore hearing aids for a number of years. As his hearing deteriorated, he learnt to lip read to be able to continue his work as a GP. He was offered a cochlear implant in 2000, which became infected and he had to take a break from his career.

In 2016, he received a successful cochlear implant, restoring his hearing after several years of profound deafness.
