= National Voices =

Coalition of English health and social care charities

National Voices is the leading coalition of health and social care charities in England, formed in 2008. It has more than 200 organisations in membership which represent a diverse range of health conditions and communities. It has a prominent role in representing patients and service users with national policy makers.

National Voices advocates for more inclusive and person centred health and care, shaped by the people who use and need it the most.

National Voices does this by:

- Understanding and advocating for what matters to people especially those living with health conditions and groups who experience inequalities
- Finding common cause across communities and conditions by working with member charities and those they support
- Connecting and convening charities, decision makers and citizens to work together to change health and care for good

In 2013, National Voices and Think Local Act Personal published a UK Department of Health commissioned ‘narrative for Person-Centred Coordinated Care’. The document defined good coordinated care from a patient and service user perspective and led to the production of a number of other ‘narratives’.

National Voices provides secretariat support to the People and Communities Board, one of the Five Year Forward View programme boards.

Jacob Lant is the Chief Executive. National Voices is funded by membership fees, partnership fees, grant funding and consultancy.

In October 2022 it took over the Health Service Journal for a week - a prize in the e-auction the journal ran in March to help people fleeing from Ukraine. Charlotte Augst, former Chief Executive challenged system leaders, the readers of the journal, to "think differently about what is needed to repair the NHS".

In September 2024, National Voices published its five-year strategy for 2024-2029, which detailed three key interconnected priorities for action:

1. End unequal access.
2. Transfer power to people and communities.
3. Shift the measures of success.

== See also ==
- Social care in the United Kingdom
