= Royal Scottish Pipe Band Association Northern Ireland Branch =

RSPBANI
- Branch logo
- Founded: October 1950
- Location: Unit 34 Crescent Business Park, Ballinderry Road, Lisburn, BT28 2GN
- Coordinates: 54°30′49″N 6°04′39″W
- Key people: Chairperson: Alastair Patterson Secretary: Danielle McCartney Patron: Sir Nigel Hamilton
- Website: www.rspbani.org

The Royal Scottish Pipe Band Association Northern Ireland Branch (RSPBANI) is a governing body to oversee Pipe band competition in Northern Ireland. It represents approximately seventy pipe bands in full membership of the association in Northern Ireland and over three thousand individual members.

The RPSBANI organises and delivers all Championship Pipe Band and Drum Major Contests in Northern Ireland and the Ulster Solo Piping and Drumming Championships. The branch provides advice, assistance and guidance to the piping community generally on organisation, governance, education and music development. They also provide a teaching facility across Northern Ireland to nationally accredited standards.

== History ==
Formal gatherings of pipe bands in Northern Ireland, for the purpose of competition, date back to 1912 when the Northern Ireland Bands Association regularly held indoor contests. Due to a growth in numbers of bands and the necessity to compete outdoors, the Northern Ireland Pipe Band League was formed in 1945. It was also in 1945 that an association of pipe bands was set up in Southern Ireland and both organisations endeavoured to work together to create the All Ireland Pipe Band Championships, an event which continues today under the auspices of the Joint Authority Council.

To become an affiliated branch of the parent body in Scotland, at that time the 'Scottish Pipe Band Association', it was necessary to have interest from at least ten bands and so in October 1950, the Northern Ireland Branch was formed.

As bands and branch membership grew, an educational plan to service and develop the membership bands and individual musical competence as well as to develop new member bands and individuals was established. Out of this plan the RSPBANI School was set up in approximately 1979 so that pupils could receive instruction in both the practical and theory elements of piping and drumming. Over the years the education project of the Branch has had a number of brand names, including the Northern Ireland Piping and Drumming School but now is known simply as the RSPBANI Branch School wherepupils can achieve standardised and recognised SQA (Scottish Qualifications Authority) qualifications.

== Operating arrangements ==
To service the whole of Northern Ireland, the Branch is divided up into four sections: County Antrim, County Down, Mid Ulster and County Fermanagh. The Sections are made up of bands operational in their respective areas and they operate with a full structure of office bearers. Section meetings are held regularly throughout the year and each has an annual general meeting. Each section also appoints a representative who sits on the branch executive to maintain communication throughout the organisation.

All member bands operate with committees made up of chairperson, secretary and treasurer. This allows the channels of communication to remain open from playing members through to the sections and branch to the executive committee which runs the branch.

== Member Bands ==
- Ballycoan Pipe Band
- Field Marshal Montgomery Pipe Band
