= Anne Carlisle (professor) =

Irish academics

Professor Anne Carlisle OBE
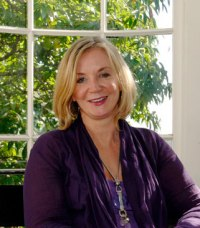
- Born: 1956 (age 69–70)

Anne Carlisle OBE (born 1956 in Northern Ireland) is a British educator.

She attended Ballyclare High School from 1974–1976. She studied a Diploma in Foundation Art & Design at the University Polytechnic, Belfast (1976). Further to this, Professor Carlisle graduated with a First Class Honours in Fine Art from the University of Ulster, Belfast (1979) and went on to complete a Masters at the University of Arts, London in 1981.

In 1990, Carlisle was appointed Senior Lecturer in Fine Art and Media at Gwent College of Higher Education. In 1995 she moved to become the Head of Field in Interactive Arts at the University of Wales College, Newport. Upon promotion, she took a position as Head of the Department of Art & Design, University of Wales College, Newport in 1997, and was then appointed Deputy Vice Chancellor of the University of Wales in Newport, where she led research and innovation including, establishing the Institute of Advanced Broadcasting and the Entrepreneurship Foundation.

In 2009, Carlisle was appointed Vice-Chancellor and CEO of what was then University College Falmouth. In this role she oversaw the merger with Dartington College of Arts The merger was instigated and developed by her predecessor Professor Alan Livingston in 2008. In 2012 Falmouth University was granted full university status.

In 2016 she was criticised by Falmouth College of Arts employees for receiving a £57,391 pay rise which equated to a 25.1% increase on her yearly salary. This took her salary to £285,900 per year. While at the same time employees went on a two-day strike to fight for a 1.1% rise.

Under the leadership as Vice-Chancellor of Falmouth University, Anne Carlisle oversaw the closure of Foundation Diploma in Art and Design that had been running since the 1960s.

Carlisle is a former Chair of the Future Economy Group on the Cornwall and Isles of Scilly Local Enterprise Partnership & Knowledge Strategy Board.

She was appointed an Officer of the Order of the British Empire (OBE) in the 2019 New Year Honours for services to Higher Education in Cornwall.

As of 2022 she is no longer the Vice-Chancellor & Chief Executive of Falmouth University
