= British Charitable Fund =

There are charities called the British Charitable Fund in a number of countries, providing financial support to impecunious British subjects and their dependents.

== Paris ==
The British Charitable Fund in Paris was founded in 1823 by the British Ambassador to France, Viscount (later Earl) Granville, to provide financial support to British subjects in poverty in France. It was originally aimed at migrant workers and their families in Paris. It now covers the whole of France and often assists migrants whose plans for a better life in France do not flourish.

The fund in Paris was supported by the British embassy in the 19th century: fundraising events including balls, and a reading by Charles Dickens in 1863. Donations from Richard Wallace supported thousands of Britons during the Siege of Paris in 1870–71, during the Franco-Prussian War. In 1896, Lieutenant Colonel Hylton Brisco left half of his personal fortune, £90,000, to the charity. The charity assisted civilians to return to the UK after the outbreak of the First World War.

Until the Second World War, the charity was based at Avenue Hoche near the Arc de Triomphe. It is now based in the Paris suburb of Levallois-Perret. It became a registered charity in the UK in 1969.

== Spain ==
The British Benevolent Fund (BBF) is one of the oldest English speaking charities in Spain with records dating back to at least 1933. It operates with the support of its honorary president, HM Ambassador to Spain, and HM Consul General. It is run by an independent chairman and committee, all of whom know Spain and its people, and are very familiar with the issues British citizens living there face, be they tourists or long-term residents. They donate their time and knowledge for free with no remuneration whatsoever.

== Other British Charitable Funds ==
An earlier British Charitable Fund was founded by the Duke of Wellington in Brussels in 1815, to assist the families of servicemen in need after the Battle of Waterloo.

A British Charitable Fund was founded in Portugal in 1827, and there are also separate funds in Italy (the British Charitable Fund for Liguria), Egypt and Tunisia.
