= Heba Bevan =

British electronics engineer

Heba Bevan OBE
- Education: University of Cambridge
- Organization: UtterBerry
- Known for: Technology innovation

Heba Bevan OBE is a British electronics engineer and founder and CEO of tech start-up UtterBerry Ltd. She studied at the University of Cambridge and was awarded an OBE in 2018 for her services to innovation, technology and STEM education. She was awarded Vodafone’s Woman of the Year Innovation Award 2021

Her work includes low-power smart sensor systems which monitor loads on structures and bridges and are used on civil engineering projects for smart construction. Utterberry is a spin-out from Cambridge University. The patented AI sensor technology has been employed by Crossrail, Thames Tideway and London Underground, Tower Bridge and Forth Road Bridge

UtterBerry offices and production are based in Leeds.
