= 2012 Birthday Honours =

British government recognitions

The Birthday Honours List 2012 was released on 16 June 2012 in the United Kingdom, on 11 June 2012 in Australia on 4 June 2012 in New Zealand, on 15 June 2012 in Antigua and Barbuda, Barbados, Grenada, Belize, Saint Lucia, Solomon Islands, and The Cook Islands. The Birthday Honours List was released during the height of the Diamond jubilee celebrations, and was therefore styled The Birthday and Diamond Jubilee Honours 2012 in New Zealand, while United Kingdom celebrated the jubilee with a separate list later that year.

The recipients of honours are displayed or referred to as they were styled before their new honour and arranged first by country, honour and where appropriate by rank (Knight Grand Cross, Knight Commander etc.) then division (Military, Civil, Overseas or Police list).

== United Kingdom ==
=== Knight Bachelor ===
- Antony Brian Baldry. For Public and Political Service.
- Peter Birkett, Chief Executive, Barnfield College, Luton. For services to Further Education and the Academy Movement
- Robin Bosher, lately Headteacher, Fairlawn Primary School, Haseltine Primary School, and Kilmorie Primary School, Lewisham. For services to Education.
- Michael Boyd, Artistic Director, Royal Shakespeare Company. For services to Drama.
- Kenneth Charles Branagh. For services to Drama and to the community in Northern Ireland.
- The Right Honourable Malcolm Gray Bruce, MP. For Public and Political Service.
- His Honour Judge Clive Vernon Callman. For services to Law, Education and Charity.
- Thomas Anthony Cunningham, MP. For Public and Political Service.
- Charles William Dunstone, Founder and Chairman, Carphone Warehouse Group. For services to the Mobile Communications Industry and to charity.
- Professor Richard John Evans, Regius Professor of History, University of Cambridge and President of Wolfson College, Cambridge. For services to Scholarship.
- Peter Fahy, QPM, Chief Constable, Greater Manchester Police. For services to Policing.
- Professor William Timothy Gowers, Royal Society Research Professor, Department of Pure Mathematics and Mathematical Statistics, University of Cambridge. For services to Mathematics.
- Dr William Haughey, OBE. For services to Business and Philanthropy.
- Thomas Michael Sydney Hughes-Hallett, Chief Executive, Marie Curie Cancer Care. For services to Palliative Care.
- Professor Robert Ian Lechler, Vice Principal (Health), King's College London, and Executive Director, King's Health Partners. For services to Academic Medicine.
- Professor James McDonald, Principal and Vice-Chancellor, University of Strathclyde. For services to Education, Engineering and the Economy.
- David McVicar, Director. For services to Opera.
- Dr Daniel Moynihan, Chief Executive, The Harris Federation of South London Schools. For services to Education.
- Brian Walter Pomeroy, CBE. For services to Financial Inclusion and to the Voluntary Sector.
- The Right Honourable George Reid. For services to Scottish Politics and Public Life.
- Professor Michael John Howard Sterling. For services to Higher Education, Science and Engineering.
- Richard Henry Simpson Stilgoe, OBE, DL, Philanthropist. For charitable services through the Alchemy Foundation.

Diplomatic Service and Overseas List

- Richard William Ground, O.B.E., Q.C., lately Chief Justice of Bermuda. For services to justice in Bermuda.

Crown Dependencies

==== Jersey ====
- Michael Birt. For services to the Crown and the community in Jersey.

=== The Order of the Bath ===
==== Knight Grand Cross of the Order of the Bath (GCB) ====
Military Division

- Air Chief Marshal Sir Stephen Gary George Dalton KCB, Royal Air Force.

==== Knight Commander of the Order of the Bath (KCB) ====
Military Division

- Admiral George Michael Zambellas DSC, Royal Navy.

Civil Division

- Paul Christopher Jenkins QC. Permanent Secretary, Treasury Solicitor's Department.

==== Companion of the Order of the Bath (CB) ====
Military Division

- Air Vice-Marshal Gregory Jack Bagwell CBE, Royal Air Force.
- Major General Michael James von Bertele OBE QHS, late Royal Army Medical Corps, British Army.
- Major General Bruce Brealey, late Royal Regiment of Artillery, British Army.
- Air Vice-Marshal Michael Paul Colley OBE, Royal Air Force.
- Surgeon Vice Admiral Philip Iain Raffaelli QHP, Surgeon-General of the British Armed Forces.
- Vice Admiral Alan David Richards, Royal Navy.
- Major General Jonathan David Shaw CBE, late The Parachute Regiment, British Army.

Civil Division

- Richard Dennis OBE.
- Helen Edwards CBE, Director-General, Justice Policy Group, Ministry of Justice.
- Richard Paul Hatfield CBE, Director-General, International, Strategy and Environment, Department for Transport.
- Edgar Frederick Jardine, Interim Chief Executive, Northern Ireland Policing Board.
- Peter Edward Lewis, Chief Executive Officer, Crown Prosecution Service.
- Miriam Catherine Rosen, Lately Her Majesty's Chief Inspector, Ofsted. For services to Education.
- Alan David Shannon, Permanent Secretary, Department for Social Development, Northern Ireland Executive.
- Professor Leonard Alan Winters, Lately Chief Economist, Department for International Development.

=== The Order of Saint Michael and Saint George ===
==== Dame Commander of the Order of St Michael and St George (DCMG) ====
Diplomatic Service and Overseas List

- (Alison) Mariot Leslie CMG, HM Ambassador and UK Permanent Representative to NATO.

==== Knight Commander of the Order of St Michael and St George (KCMG) ====
Diplomatic Service and Overseas List

- James David Bevan CMG, High Commissioner, India.
- The Right Honourable Sir Murray Stuart-Smith, lately President, Court of Appeal, Gibraltar. For services to justice in Gibraltar.

==== Companion of the Order of St Michael and St George (CMG) ====
Diplomatic Service and Overseas List

- Deborah Jane Bronnert, HM Ambassador, Zimbabwe
- The Right Honourable Sir Henry Brooke, President, The Slynn Foundation. For services to justice reform in Albania.
- Calixte George For services to the nation in agriculture and government.
- James Wyndham John Hughes-Hallett, Chairman, John Swire & Sons Ltd. For services to British business interests in Asia and Australasia.
- (William) Alistair Harrison CVO, Governor of Anguilla.
- Anthony John Liddell Nightingale, lately Managing Director, the Jardine Matheson Group, Hong Kong. For services to British business interests in Asia.
- Michael Angus O'Neill, lately Head of Mission, Provincial Reconstruction Team, Helmand, Afghanistan.
- Dr Jeffrey Phillip Owens, lately Director, OECD Centre for Tax Policy and Administration, Paris, France. For services to international tax co-operation.
- Dr Ian Stuart Robertson, Member, BMW AG Board of Management and lately Board Chairman, Rolls-Royce Motor Cars Ltd. For services to the British car industry.
- Andrea Lester Rose OBE, Director, Visual Arts, British Council
- Dr Patrick Gilmer Topping, Director, Foreign and Commonwealth Office
- Jonathan Paul Wilks, lately HM Ambassador, Yemen

=== Royal Victorian Order ===
==== Knight Commander of the Royal Victorian Order (KCVO) ====
- Lt Col Andrew Charles Ford, Comptroller, Lord Chamberlain's Office.
- Dr. Donal Arthur John Keegan OBE, Lord-Lieutenant of Londonderry.

==== Commander of the Royal Victorian Order (CVO) ====
- Paula Carolyn Diggle CBE, Treasury Officer of Accounts, HM Treasury.
- Leslie Jane Ferrar, Treasurer, Household of The Prince of Wales and The Duchess of Cornwall.
- Trefor Glyn Jones CBE, Lord-Lieutenant of Clwyd.
- His Grace The Duke of Westminster KG CB OBE TD CD DL, Formerly member of the council, Duchy of Cornwall.
- The Reverend Canon John Austin White LVO, Canon and vice Dean, St. George's Chapel, Windsor Castle.

==== Lieutenant of the Royal Victorian Order (LVO) ====
- Helen Elizabeth Asprey MVO, Personal private secretary to The Duke and Duchess of Cambridge and Prince Harry.
- Keith Roy Banham MVO, Farm mgr, Sandringham Estate.
- Lt Col Peter Guy Chamberlin, Lieutenant, Her Majesty's Body Guard of the Honourable Corps of Gentlemen at Arms.
- Herbert Allen Le Roy, Formerly private secretary to the Lieutenant Governor of British Columbia.
- Dr. Alastair Neil Robertson Niven OBE, Principal, King George VI and Queen Elizabeth Foundation of St. Catherine.
- Jeremy Patrick Bagwell Purefoy MVO, Assistant secretary (Insignia), Central Chancery of the Orders of Knighthood.
- Elizabeth Ann Roads MVO, Lyon Clerk and Keeper of the Records.
- Dr. Manon Bonner Williams MVO, Private secretary for Wales to The Prince of Wales and The Duchess of Cornwall.

==== Member of the Royal Victorian Order (MVO) ====
- John Christopher Allen RVM, Travelling Orderly, Household of The Prince of Wales and The Duchess of Cornwall.
- Inspector Robert Leslie Anderson, Metropolitan Police. For services to Royalty Protection.
- Matthew Charles Arnoldi, Head of Protocol, Westminster Abbey.
- Maj. Alan Llewellyn Denman MBE, Superintendent, Windsor Castle.
- Sgt Iain Roderick George, Metropolitan Police. For services to Royalty Protection.
- James Goodall, Foreman, Windsor Castle.
- Christopher Michael Gregory, Land Steward, Isles of Scilly, Duchy of Cornwall.
- Gilbert James Harris RVM, Senior Gardener, Property Section, Royal Household.
- Karin Elizabeth (Lisa) Heighway, Curator of Photographs, Royal Collection.
- Roy Thomas Maloney, Formerly Hot Water Fitter, Property Section, Royal Household.
- Sheila Ann Montgomery, Finance manager, Balmoral Estate.
- Stephen John Martin Sheasby, Senior Gilding Conservator, Royal Collection.
- Nicola Williams, Pensions manager (designate) and Personnel manager, Royal Household.
- Timothy John Williams RVM, Head Chauffeur, Household of The Prince of Wales and The Duchess of Cornwall.
- Toby David Zeegen, Information Technology Systems manager, Royal Household.

==== Royal Victorian Medal (RVM) ====
- Peter Brooks, Caretaker, College of St. George, Windsor Castle.
- Veronica Victoria Cain, Dresser to The Princess Royal.
- Norman John Dunn, Head Gardener, Government House, Canberra.
- Div Sgt Maj John Frederick Mundy, The Queen's Body Guard of the Yeomen of the Guard.
- Christopher Phelps, Gardener, Hampton Court Palace.
- Graham Cornelius Sanderson, Head of Valley Gardens, Crown Estate, Windsor.
- Miss Julie Katherine Weldon, Housekeeping Assistant, Windsor Castle.

=== Order of the British Empire ===
==== Knight Grand Cross of the Order of the British Empire (GBE) ====
- Sir (Thomas) John Parker. For services to Industry and to the Voluntary Sector.

==== Dame Commander of the Order of the British Empire (DBE) ====
- Dr Mary Doreen Archer, Chair, Cambridge University Hospitals NHS Foundation Trust. For services to the NHS.
- Ms Zaha Hadid CBE. For services to Architecture.
- The Right Honourable Tessa Jane Jowell MP. For political and charitable services.
- Professor Julia Elizabeth King CBE, Vice-Chancellor, Aston University. For services to Higher Education and Technology.
- Professor Tina Lavender, Professor of Midwifery, School of Nursing, Midwifery and Social Work, University of Manchester. For services to Midwifery.
- Lucy Jeanne Neville-Rolfe CMG, Deputy Chair, British Retail Consortium and Executive Director, Corporate and Legal Affairs, Tesco plc. For services to Industry and voluntary service.
- Theresa, Mrs Sackler. Philanthropist. For services to the Arts.
- Professor Janet Maureen Thornton CBE, Director, European Bioinformatics Institute. For services to Bioinformatics.

==== Knight Commander of the Order of the British Empire (KBE) ====
Military Division
Royal Navy

- Vice Admiral Charles Montgomery CBE ADC C022648J.

Army

- Lieutenant General Gary Coward CB OBE, late Army Air Corps, 497393.
- Lieutenant General Paul Newton CBE, late The Princess of Wales's Royal Regiment, 499752.

Civil Division

- Charles Gerald John, The Right Honourable the Earl Cadogan, DL, Philanthropist. For charitable services.

==== Commander of the Order of the British Empire (CBE) ====
Military Division
Royal Navy

- Rear Admiral Thomas Anthony Cunningham, C025363Q.
- Rear Admiral Stephen John Lloyd, C024601P.

Civil Division

- Professor Andreas Ntinou Adam, Professor of Interventional Radiology, St. Thomas' Hospital, London. For services to Interventional Radiology.
- Lesley-Anne Alexander, Chief Executive, Royal National Institute of Blind People and Chair, Association of Chief Executives of Voluntary Organisations. For services to the Voluntary Sector.
- Michael Alexander Baker, Head of Benefits Centres, Benefits Directorate, Department for Work and Pensions.
- James Mark Bayley, lately Chief Executive, London and Continental Railways Ltd. For services to the Rail Industry.
- Joshua Adam Berger, President and Managing Director, Warner Bros UK. For services to the Creative Industries.
- Michael Berkeley, Composer and Broadcaster. For services to Music.
- Mary Berry, Cookery Writer and Broadcaster. For services to Culinary Arts.
- Dr Irene Bishop, Co-Director, Southwark Schools Learning Partnership and Headteacher, St. Saviour's and St. Olave's Church of England Secondary School. For services to Education.
- Tony Burton, Director, Civic Voice. For services to Planning, Local Government and Communities.
- Paul Michael Callaghan, Chairman, One North East Regional Development Agency. For services to the North East Region.
- James Macrae Campbell, Director, Energy Development, Department of Energy and Climate Change.
- Paul Stephen Carroll, Senior Civil Servant, H.M. Prison Service, Ministry of Justice.
- Professor Lorna Ann Casselton, Emeritus Professor of Fungal Genetics, University of Oxford. For services to Fungal Genetics and to International Science.
- Alexander Surtees Chancellor. For services to Journalism.
- Susan Avril Chinn. For charitable services to Health and to the Arts.
- Dr Richard Henry Tudor Christophers, Founder, The Sixteen. For services to Music.
- Jeremy Charles Clarke, Chair, New Savoy Partnership. For services to Mental Health.
- Carole Cochrane DL, Ambassador and lately Chief Executive, The Princess Royal Trust for Carers. For services to Family Carers.
- Professor William Stuart Cole. For services to Transport.
- David Beresford Cragg OBE, lately National Director of Development, Skills Funding Agency and Lately Deputy Chairman, WorldSkills 2011. For services to Education and Skills.
- Judge Nicholas Crichton, District Judge. For services to the Family Justice System.
- Adrian Kevin Curley, lately Chief Executive, National Association for Voluntary and Community Action. For services to the Voluntary and Community Sector.
- David John Daniels, Chief Consultant, Sensors, Cobham Technical Services. For services to the Defence Industry.
- Paul Elliot MBE. For services to Equality and Diversity in Football.
- Professor Jonathan Richard Ellis FRS, Clerk Maxwell Professor of Theoretical Physics, King's College London and Scientist, CERN. For services to Science and Technology.
- Maria Delfina Entrecanales. For services to the Arts.
- Dr James Austin Ferguson, Senior Civil Servant, Permanent Secretary for Tax Group (Central Policy), London, H.M. Revenue and Customs.
- Stuart John Fraser, Chairman, Policy and Resources Committee, City of London Corporation. For services to the City of London.
- Michael John Fuhr OBE, Commercial Adviser, Department for Transport.
- Mary Jane Furniss, Chief Executive Officer, Independent Police Complaints Commission. For services to Justice and Policing.
- Professor Christopher Gaskell, Principal, Royal Agricultural College, Cirencester. For services to Veterinary Medicine and Agriculture.
- Professor Duncan Mackay Geddes, Consultant in Respiratory Medicine, Royal Brompton Hospital, London. For services to Medical Research, Charity and Education.
- Marion Olive Gibbs, Co-Director, Southwark Schools Learning Partnership and Headteacher, James Allen's Girls' School, Southwark, London. For services to Education.
- Robert Ian Neilson Gordon DL, Leader, Hertfordshire County Council. For services to Local Government.
- Michael Grabiner, lately Chairman, Partnerships for Schools. For services to Education.
- Professor Monica Mary Grady, Professor of Planetary and Space Science, Open University. For services to Space Science.
- Professor Ian Richard Hargreaves, Professor of Digital Economy, Cardiff University. For services to the Creative Economy and Higher Education.
- Peter Hay, President, Association of Directors of Adult Social Services. For services to Social and Health Care.
- Professor Janet Hemingway, F.R.S., Director, Liverpool School of Tropical Medicine. For services to the Control of Tropical Disease Vectors.
- Eric Douglas Hepburn, lately Chief Operating Officer, 10 Downing Street.
- Victoria Mary Taylor Heywood, Executive Director, Royal Shakespeare Company. For services to Drama.
- Emma Hill, Creative Director, Mulberry. For services to the British Fashion Industry.
- Susan Hill, Author. For services to Literature.
- Professor Mary Longstaff Jacobus, Professor of English and Director, Centre for Research in the Arts, Social Sciences and Humanities, University of Cambridge. For services to Literary Scholarship.
- David John Jeans. For services to Life Science, Healthcare and Science.
- Clare Jones, Joint Chief Executive, WomenCentre. For services to Vulnerable Women.
- Owen Griffith Ronald Jones, Executive Chairman, Tinopolis. For services to the Media Industry.
- Patricia Jones, lately Director, Prisoners' Education Trust. For services to Offender Learning.
- Peter Keen OBE, Special Adviser, UK Sport. For services to Sport.
- Ruth Laird. For public and voluntary service.
- Catherine Lee, Justice Policy Director, Ministry of Justice.
- Professor Tak Hong Lee, Director, MRC and Asthma UK Centre, Allergic Mechanisms of Asthma, King's College London and Imperial College London. For Research in Asthma and Allergy.
- Professor Irene May Leigh OBE, lately Vice Principal for Research and Head of College of Medicine, Dentistry and Nursing, University of Dundee. For services to Medicine.
- Professor Jack Lohman, lately Director, Museum of London.
- Duncan Macniven TD, lately Registrar General for Scotland.
- Bernadette Malone, Chief Executive, Perth and Kinross Council. For services to Local Government.
- Kit Martin. For services to Conservation.
- Dr Michael Campbell McCafferty OBE, Senior Civil Servant, Head of Counter Terrorism and UK Operational Policy, Operations Directorate, Ministry of Defence.
- Professor Hilary McCallion, Director of Nursing, South London and the Maudsley. For services to Nursing.
- Professor Kathleen McCourt, Dean, School of Health, Community and Education Studies, Northumbria University. For services to Nursing.
- Kevin Charles Patrick McGinty, Deputy Director- General and Director of Criminal Law, Attorney General's Office.
- Catherine Irene Jacqueline Meyer. Founder and Chief Executive, Parents and Abducted Children Together. For services to Children and Families.
- Jeremy Middleton, lately Chairman, Conservative National Convention. For Political and charitable services.
- Karen Middleton, Chief Health Professions Officer, Department of Health.
- Dr Jennifer Iris Rachel Montagu LVO, Honorary Fellow, Warburg Institute. For services to Art History
- Professor David Michael Garrood Newbery FBA, Emeritus Professor of Applied Economics, University of Cambridge. For services to Economics.
- Dr Leonard John Patrick O'Hagan DL, Chairman, Belfast Harbour Commissioners. For services to the Ports Industry, the Economy and Tourism in Northern Ireland.
- Joseph Alexander Patrick DL, Philanthropist. For charitable services.
- Christine Pollock, Executive Director, Learning and Leisure Services, North Lanarkshire Council. For services to Education.
- Robert Reitmeier, lately Chief Executive, The Children's Society. For services to Children.
- The Right Honourable Peter John Robert Riddell. For services to Journalism and for public service.
- Dr Gordon Rintoul, Director, the National Museums of Scotland. For services to the Museum Sector.
- Lisa Rodrigues, Chief Executive, Sussex Partnership NHS Foundation Trust. For services to the NHS.
- Timothy John Denis Rollinson, Director-General and Deputy Chair, Forestry Commission.
- Maxine Room, Principal, Lewisham College. For services to Further Education and to Race and Gender Equality.
- Professor Christopher John Rudge, lately National Clinical Director for Transplantation and Consultant in Renal Transplantation. For services to Transplantation and Organ Donation.
- Dr Peter Rundell, Senior Representative, Libya, Department for International Development.
- Ann Santry, Chief Executive, Sovereign Housing Association. For services to Social Housing.
- Dr Michael John Short. For services to the Mobile Communications Industry.
- Colin P. Smith, Director, Engineering and Technology, Rolls-Royce plc. For services to UK Engineering.
- Richard Alfred Soper, Chief Executive Officer, Bosch Thermotechnology Ltd. For services to the Heating and Renewable Technologies Industries.
- Dr Cornelia Sorabji, Deputy Chief of the Assessments Staff.
- Alistair Spalding, Chief Executive and Artistic Director, Sadler's Wells. For services to Dance.
- Penelope Thompson, Chief Executive, General Social Care Council. For services to Social Care.
- Shaheen Unis, DL. For services to Business and Community Relations.
- Robert Adrian Joseph Waddingham. For services to Business and Community Relations.
- Dr David Walton. For services to charity and the community in Glasgow.
- Professor Harriet Ward, Research Professor and Director, Centre for Child and Family Research. For services to Children and Families.
- Elaine June Way, Chief Executive, Western Health and Social Care Trust. For services to Healthcare.
- Professor Paul William Wellings, lately Vice-Chancellor, University of Lancaster. For services to Higher Education.
- Professor Julie Williams, Cardiff University. For services to Alzheimer's Disease Research.
- Michael Sumner Wilson. For services to the Insurance Industry and to Charity.
- Kate Elizabeth Winslet, Actress. For services to Drama.
- Ian Winter, Deputy Director for Social Care and Partnerships, Department of Health. For services to Social Care.
- Professor Alison Wolf, Sir Roy Griffiths Professor of Public Sector Management, King's College London. For services to Education.
- Elizabeth Jane Woodeson, Director, Health and Wellbeing Division, Department of Health.

==== Officer of the Order of the British Empire (OBE) ====
Military Division
Royal Navy

- Commodore Robert James Mansergh, Royal Navy, C024356C.
- Captain Stephen John Murdoch, Royal Navy, C028999K.
- Commander Jason Peter Phillips, Royal Navy, C035529B.
- Captain Jeremy Melrose Plant, Royal Navy, C027578Q.
- Captain Richard Laurence Powell, Royal Navy, C029108J.
- Captain Christopher Mark Skidmore, Royal Navy, C032514T.

Civil Division

- Michael Adams, Chief Executive, Essex Coalition of Disabled People. For services to Disabled People.
- Ms Jennifer Ann Agutter. For charitable services.
- Michael John Allen, lately Chair, Royal Society of Wildlife Trusts. For services to Wildlife Conservation.
- Councillor Joseph Anderson, Leader, Liverpool City Council. For services to Local Government and the community.
- Jameson Ross Andrew. For services to Charity.
- Dr. Norman Apsley, Chief Executive, Northern Ireland Science Park. For services to Science and Economic Development.
- Kwame Kwei-Armah, Playwright, Director and Actor. For services to Drama.
- Leonard Thomas Arnold. For services to Gymnastics.
- Malcolm Arnold. For services to Athletics.
- Yvonne Arnold. For services to Gymnastics.
- Ms Gillian Attrill, Head, Commissioning Strategies Group, National Offenders Management Service.
- Professor Clive Elton Badman, Vice-President, Investigational Material Supply, GlaxoSmithKline. For services to the Pharmaceutical Manufacturing Industry and Sustainable Development.
- Lorraine Ingrid, Mrs. Baldry, Chair, Olympic Delivery Authority Planning Committee. For services to Planning and Regeneration.
- Gillian, Mrs. Ball. Finance Director, University of Birmingham. For services to Higher Education.
- Peter Michael Barber, Head of Map Collections, British Library. For services to Cartography and Topography.
- Gary Barlow. For services to the Entertainment Industry and to Charity.
- Ms Edith Jane Beaver, District Manager, Mercia District, Jobcentre Plus, Department for Work and Pensions.
- Rita Shirley, Mrs. Beckwith, Co-owner and Chief Executive Officer, City Cruises plc. For services to the Leisure and Tourism Industry and the Regeneration of London's Docklands.
- Ms Kay Bedford, Headteacher, Swiss Cottage Specialist SEN School. For services to Education.
- Norman Graeme Hylton Bell. For services to the Town and Country Planning Association.
- Miss Brenda May Billington, lately Consultant Ophthalmic Surgeon, Royal Berkshire NHS Foundation Trust, Reading. For services to Ophthalmology.
- Dr. Alison Jane Birkinshaw, Principal, York College and Chairman, Further Education Reputation Strategy Group. For services to Further Education.
- John Dexter Bishop. For services to Agriculture and to the community in Berkshire.
- Matthew Bishop, Volunteer and Board Member, Child Exploitation and Online Protection. For services to the Protection of Children Online.
- Dr. Robert Mark Bloomfield, Head, Special Projects and Innovation, National History Museum. For services to Science.
- Dr. Peter William Bonfield, Chief Executive, BRE. For services to Research and Innovation in the Construction Industry.
- Dr. Ian Cuthbert Bradley. For services to People with Special Needs in Pontesford, Shrewsbury and to Healthcare in Tanzania.
- William Brake. For services to Business and Charity in Kent.
- John Remfry Brookes. For voluntary and public service.
- Patricia, Mrs. Brown. For public service.
- Miss Rebecca Buckingham, lately Head of Justice and Rule of Law, Helmand Provincial Reconstruction Team, Department for International Development.
- Dr. Olive Buckley, General Practitioner and Chair, Sexual Assault Referral Centre Steering Group. For services to Healthcare in Northern Ireland.
- Ms Anne Bulford, Chief Operating Officer, Channel 4. For services to Broadcasting.
- Dr. Michael Anthony Bull. For services to Sport and to Charity.
- Sarah, Mrs. Burton, Creative Director, Alexander McQueen. For services to the British Fashion Industry.
- Richard Callicott. For services to Volleyball.
- Peter John Campbell. For Political Service.
- James Thomas Carlson. For services to Combating Homelessness.
- Peter William Mark Carroll, Nuclear Security Principal, UK Global Threat Reduction Programme. For services to Global Nuclear Security.
- Dr. Nigel Carter, Chief Executive, British Dental Health Foundation, Warwickshire. For services to Dental and Oral Health.
- Jean, Mrs. MacLellan-Chlebowska, Divisional Head, Adult Care and Support Division, Scottish Government.
- Catherine, Mrs. Christie, Director, South West Young People, Young People's Learning Agency. For services to Young People.
- Adrian Paul Clark, lately Cardiff Location Director and Chief Operating Officer for Protection, Legal and General Assurance Society Ltd. For services to the Financial Services Sector.
- Patrick Clarke, Director of Operations, UK Power Networks. For services to Black and Minority Ethnic Youth Mentoring.
- Dr. Deborah Cohen, Senior Medical Research Fellow, Cardiff University. For services to Occupational Health.
- Dr. Timothy Frederick Coles, Project Director, Operation Wallacea Ltd. For services to Environmental Conservation.
- Vivien Ann, Mrs. Cooper. Founder and Chair of Trustees, The Challenging Behaviour Foundation. For services to People with Severe Learning Disabilities and their Families.
- Aidan Keith Cotter, H.M. Coroner, Birmingham and Solihull. For services to the Bereaved and the Coronial System.
- Ms Alison Cox. For services to the community in the UK and overseas.
- Sean Cox, Project Lead, Sponsored Academy Projects, Department for Education.
- Antony Martin Dean, Head of Product Design, Identity and Passport Service, Home Office.
- Ms Bonnie Dean, Chief Executive, Bristol & Bath Science Park. For services to Design, Technology and Innovation.
- Patrick Dempsey. For services to the Hotel Industry.
- Patricia Denham, Vice Principal and Deputy CEO, South Devon College. For services to Further Education.
- Peter George Taylor Denison, Chairman, Stepping Stones Trust. For services to the Rehabilitation of Offenders.
- Dr. Anne Regina Douglas. For services to the Health of Asylum Seekers and Refugees.
- Colin Irwin John Hamilton Drummond, Chief Executive, Viridor Waste. For services to Technology and Innovation.
- Ian Duckmanton, Manager, Poppylands Sure Start Children's Centres, Norfolk. For services to Children and Families.
- Professor Conor Finbar Duggan, Emeritus Professor of Forensic Mental Health, University of Nottingham and Head of Research and Development, Partnerships in Care. For services to Mental Health.
- Cheryl, Mrs. Dunn, Director of Nursing and Midwifery, Royal Wolverhampton Hospitals NHS Trust. For services to Nursing.
- Karen Dawn, Mrs. Edwards. For services to the voluntary sector in the UK.
- Marsha, Mrs. Carey-Elms, J.P., lately Executive Headteacher, Kendrick School and Reading Girls' School, Reading. For services to Education.
- Professor Peter Elwood, Honorary Professor, Cardiff University. For services to Health.
- Michael Robert Nesbit Evans. For voluntary service to St. John Ambulance.
- Zarin, Mrs. Hainsworth Fadaei. Founder, Naserian. For services to Women and Equality.
- Julia, Mrs. Feast, Policy, Research and Development Consultant for the British Association for Adoption and Fostering. For services to Children and Families.
- Robert Andrew Fletcher, Philanthropist. For charitable services in Bath.
- Professor James Stewart Forsyth, Chairman, Neonatal Expert Advisory Group. For services to Children's Health in Scotland.
- Dr. Jennifer Margaret Freeman, Director, Historic Chapels Trust. For services to Heritage.
- Jerome Frost, Head of Design and Regeneration, Olympic Delivery Authority. For services to Regeneration.
- Ian Stuart Galloway, Programme Director and Chief Executive Officer, CLM Delivery Partner, Olympic Delivery Authority. For services to the Construction Industry.
- Edward Gardner, Music Director, English National Opera. For services to Music.
- Peter James Garrod, lately Head, Lancashire Adult Learning. For services to Further Education.
- Professor John Gaventa. For services to Oxfam.
- David Gilbert, Director of Regeneration, Carmarthenshire County Council. For services to Regeneration and Skills and to the community in West Wales.
- Anna, Mrs. Gill, lately Co-Chair, Norfolk Children's Learning Difficulty and Disability Board. For services to Disabled Children and Families.
- Richard William Gleave. For services to Ballroom Dancing.
- Miss Bridget Josephine Glendinning, Principal, Single Farm Payments, Department of Agriculture and Rural Development, Northern Ireland Executive.
- John Michael Glover. For services to Water Polo.
- Professor Peter Taylor-Gooby, Professor for Social Policy, University of Kent. For services to Social Science.
- Dr. Dougal Jocelyn Goodman, Chief Executive, The Foundation for Science and Technology. For services to Science.
- Ms Polly Gowers. For services to Philanthropy in the UK.
- Prem Goyal. For services to the Economy and Promoting Charitable Giving.
- John Alexander Graham, Principal, Belfast Model School for Girls. For services to Education in Northern Ireland.
- Debra Jean, Mrs. Green. For services to Community Cohesion.
- Miss Felicity Green. For services to Journalism.
- Martin Lewis Green, Chief Executive, English Community Care Association. For services to Social Care.
- David Michael Griffiths, lately Headteacher, Cardiff High School. For services to Education in Cardiff.
- Keith Hamill, Pro-Chancellor and Lately President of Council, University of Nottingham. For services to Business and Higher Education.
- Kamal Hanif, Headteacher, Waverley School, Birmingham. For services to Education.
- Jeremy Thomas Hardcastle, Vice-President, Nissan Technical Centre Europe. For services to the UK Automotive Industry.
- Councillor James Harker, Leader, Northamptonshire County Council. For services to Civic Society and to the Economy in Northamptonshire.
- Willem Cornelis Hart, Inspector of Marine Accidents, Department for Transport.
- Ms Sahar Hashemi, Entrepreneur. For services to the UK Economy and to Charity.
- Daniel John Hawkes, Avionics Systems Specialist, Civil Aviation Authority. For services to Aviation Safety.
- Peter Hawkins, Human Development Team Leader, Department for International Development.
- Miss Lynne Head, Head of Organisational Change Programme, Home Office Science.
- Ms Sarah Elizabeth Hearn. For services to the International Programme and Development Team, Afghanistan, Department for International Development.
- Brigadier Charles William Peter Hobson. For services to the Royal Marines Association.
- Professor Margaret Ellen Hodson, Professor of Respiratory Medicine, Imperial College and Royal Brompton Hospital, London.
- Keith Michael Holder, Head, Central Service Management Division, Education Standards Directorate, Department for Education.
- Professor Sian Hope, Executive Director of Innovation and Professor of Computer Science, Bangor University. For services to Innovation and Computing.
- Christopher Wyndham Hughes, Senior Independent Director, Board of the Pension Protection Fund. For services to Pension Protection.
- David Charles Hypher DL. For charitable services.
- Armando Giovanni Iannucci. For services to Broadcasting.
- The Reverend Leslie Worrell Isaac. For services to Community Cohesion through Street Pastors.
- Philip Alexander Jamieson, lately Headteacher, Alsop High School, Technology and Applied Learning Specialist College, Liverpool.
- James Frederick Jarvie, Head, Criminal and Financial Investigation, UK Border Agency.
- Professor Ashraf Jawaid, Deputy Vice Chancellor (External Relations), University of Bedfordshire. For services to Higher Education.
- Alexandrina, Mrs. Jay, Chief Social Work Adviser, Directorate for Children and Families, Scottish Government.
- Brian Peter Jennins. For charitable services and to the Landscape Industry in the North West.
- Colonel Ewart Alan Jolley TD DL. For services to the community in North West England.
- Aidan Jones, lately Chief Executive, WorldSkills London 2011. For services to Skills.
- Andrew John Jowett, Chief Executive, Performances Birmingham Symphony Hall and Town Hall. For services to Music.
- Anna Domenica, Mrs.Kennedy, Co-Founder, Hillingdon Manor School, and Founder, annakennedyonline. For services to Special Needs Education and Autism.
- Edward Kidd. For services to the Charitable Giving Sector in the UK.
- The Right Honourable The Baroness Kidron of Angel, Film Director. For services to Drama.
- John King, Operational Learning Manager, Jobcentre Plus, Department for Work and Pensions.
- Matthew Robert King. For services to People with Disabilities and to Charity.
- Professor George Robert Kinghorn, Consultant, Genito-Urinary Medicine, Royal Hallamshire Hospital, Sheffield. For services to Genito-Urinary Medicine.
- Jonathon Jason Kingsley, Chief Executive Officer, Creative Director and Co-Founder of Rebellion. For services to the Economy.
- Milica, Mrs. Kitson, Chief Executive, Constructing Excellence in Wales. For services to the Construction Industry in Wales.
- William Knight, Director, Financial Reporting Council. For services to Financial Regulation.
- Angela Dorothy Krokou, Chair, Tavistock and Portman NHS Foundation Trust. For services to Mental Health.
- Ms Brenda Mary Last. For services to Dance.
- David Charles Lawrence, Principal and Chief Executive, Easton College. For services to Land-Based Further and Higher Education in Norfolk.
- John Paul Lee. For services to the City of Newcastle upon Tyne.
- Michael Julius Leek. For services to Sport for Disabled Children and to the community in Solihull and Birmingham.
- Ms Sally Lewis, Chief Executive Officer, Avon and Somerset Probation Trust. For services to Public Protection and Reducing Reoffending.
- David William Liddell, Director, Scottish Drugs Forum. For services to Disadvantaged People in Scotland.
- Ms Tasmin Little, Violinist. For services to Music.
- Professor Mary Joy Lovegrove, lately Head, Allied Health Sciences, London South Bank University. For services to Allied Health Care.
- Eric Low, Chief Executive, Myeloma UK. For services to Charity.
- Matthew Lugg, Director, Environment and Transport, Leicestershire County Council. For services to Local Government.
- James Andrew Lumb. For Political Service.
- Alexander Allan MacDonald, lately Convener of Comhairle nan Eilean Siar. For services to Local Government and the community in the Western Isles.
- Ms Joanna MacGregor, Pianist. For services to Music.
- Roderick James MacGregor. For services to the Economy and to the community in the Highlands and Islands.
- Jacqueline, Mrs. MacLean, Headteacher, Shortlees Primary School, Nursery and Family Centre, Kilmarnock. For services to Education and the community in East Ayrshire.
- Gareth Malone, Choirmaster and Broadcaster. For services to Music.
- Miss Jean Marsh. For services to Drama.
- Stephen Lawton Marshall, lately Headteacher, St. Julian's School, Newport. For services to Education and to the community in South East Wales.
- Dina, Mrs. Martin, Headteacher, Firs Hill Community Primary School, Sheffield. For services to Education.
- Dr. Carl Nicholas Mayers, Grade B1, Ministry of Defence.
- Brendan Michael McCartan, Senior Principal Veterinary Officer, Veterinary Service, Department of Agriculture and Rural Development, Northern Ireland Executive.
- Jacqueline Ann, Mrs. McCormick, Sure Start Children's Centre Locality Manager, West Northumberland. For services to Children and Families.
- Iain McGeoch, Chairman and Managing Director, M&Co. For services to Business and to Charity in Scotland.
- Alistair Martin McMillan. For charitable services in the North West of England.
- Dennis George Minnis, Honorary Alderman. For services to Community Cohesion and to charity in Birmingham, West Midlands.
- Ms Ruth Miskin. Founder, Read Write Inc. For services to Education.
- Andrew Gregory Moore, Grade B1, Ministry of Defence.
- Simon Moores. Founder, Ellerdale Trust and supporter, NSPCC. For services to Children.
- Christopher David Morecroft, lately Adviser and former Principal, Worcester College of Technology. For services to Further Education.
- John Dennis Mowbray, Director of Corporate Affairs, Northumbrian Water Limited. For services to the Water Industry and to Charity.
- Professor Gordon Murray, lately Chairman of Management (Entrepreneurship), University of Exeter Business School. For services to Business.
- Ms Sara Elizabeth Murray, Chief Executive Officer, Buddi, and Board Member, Technology Strategy Board. For services to Entrepreneurship and Innovation.
- Tom Crighton Murray, Director of Legal Services and Applications, The Scottish Legal Aid Board. For services to the Legal System in Scotland.
- Carole Mary, Mrs. Nash, D.L., Philanthropist. For charitable services in North West England.
- Julian Peter Neale. For services to the Stabilisation Unit, H.M. Government.
- Benjamin Nealon. For services to Pump Aid, Africa.
- Professor Judith Alice Newman, Professor of American Studies, University of Nottingham. For services to Scholarship.
- James Niblett, International Policy Director, Ofcom. For services to Telecommunications.
- Mary, Mrs. Nicol, lately Head of HR Strategy and Policy, Scottish Parliament. For public and voluntary service.
- Michael Nunn, Co-founder, the Ballet Boyz. For services to Dance.
- Michael Samuel Oakes, lately Principal, South Downs College. For services to Further Education.
- Patricia, Mrs. O'Brien, lately Headteacher, English Martyrs Primary School, Sefton. For services to Education.
- Michael Roderick Oliver, D.L., Chairman, Oliver Valves. For services to the Valve Industry.
- Ms Ruth Owen, Chief Executive, Whizz-Kidz, London. For services to Disabled Children and Young People.
- Miss Elaine Marguirite Padmore, lately Director of Opera, Royal Opera House. For services to Music.
- Kathleen, Mrs. Paintin. Founder and Chair, North West Network. For services to Special Needs Education.
- Philip Eraclis Papard, H.M. Principal Inspector of Health and Safety, Health and Safety Executive.
- Carole Patricia, Mrs. Patey. For services to Heritage and Arts Fundraising.
- Jeremy Peat, Director, David Hume Institute. For services to Business and Public Service in Scotland.
- Alison Jane, Mrs. Perry, Managing Director, Triangle Builders Ltd, Liverpool and Chair, National Federation of Builders. For services to the Construction Industry.
- Jonathan Mark Phillips, lately Director, Adult Social Services, Calderdale Council. For services to Social Care.
- Professor Alison Phipps, Professor of Languages and Inter-cultural Studies, University of Glasgow. For services to Education and Inter-Cultural and Inter- Religious Relations.
- Ms Victoria Pomery, Director, Turner Contemporary. For services to the Arts.
- Ms Sally Potter, Director. For services to Film.
- Derrick Arthur Langley Price, Senior Investigating Officer, DEFRA Investigation Services and Counsellor, CRUSE Bereavement Care UK.
- Manjit, Mrs. Rai, Headteacher, North Beckton Primary School, Newham. For services to Education.
- Harcharanjit Singh Rapal (Channi Singh). For services to Bhangra Music, Charity and to the community in Hounslow, West London.
- Anthony Edward Redsell. Farmer. For services to the UK Hops Industry.
- Andrew John Reed. For services to the community and to Sport in Leicestershire.
- Nigel Reeder, Chief Executive, Judicial Appointments Commission.
- Patrick Regan. Founder and Leader, XLP Youth Charity, London. For services to Young People.
- John Nigel Reynolds, Vice-President, Save The Children. For services to Save The Children.
- Ms Sally Reynolds, Co-Founder and lately Chief Executive, Social Firms UK. For services to Equality in the Labour Market.
- Dr. Paul Rice, Grade B1, Ministry of Defence.
- Anthony Howard Norman Roberts. For services to the Medical Field, Ornithology and to the community in the Isle of Wight.
- Professor Peter David Roberts, lately Head of Plasma Physics Science and Technology, AWE Aldermaston. For services to the Defence Industry.
- James Mcintyre Robertson. For services to the House of Commons.
- Nancy Robson. For services to Consumers, Food Safety and Public Health.
- Anthony George Edward Rowe. For services to Business, Sport and Charity in Exeter, Devon.
- Ms Elizabeth Jane Ryder, lately Chief Executive, Office of the Scottish Charity Regulator. For services to the Arts and Charity in Scotland.
- Peter Nicholas Salussolia. For services to the Hospitality Industry.
- Professor Alastair Duncan Scotland, lately Medical Director, National Clinical Assessment Service. For services to Public Health.
- Dr. Bhaskar Sengupta, Reader in Civil Engineering at Queen's University Belfast. For services to Higher Education and International Environmental Research.
- Professor Ian Alexander Shanks, Chairman, Science Advisory Group for the National Physical Laboratory. For services to Innovation.
- Professor Peter Frederick Sharp, Professor of Medical Physics, University of Aberdeen. For services to Healthcare Science.
- Kshama, Mrs. Shore, Deputy Head, Debt Management and Banking, Northampton, H.M. Revenue and Customs.
- Professor Iqbal Singh, Consultant, Geriatrician and Professor, Ethnicity and Health, Lancashire. For services to the NHS.
- Colin Frank Skellett, Executive Chairman, Wessex Water. For services to Business and to WaterAid.
- Nicholas Skelton, Show Jumper. For services to Equestrian Sport.
- Jeffrey Kenneth Smith, Customer Champion, Business Tax Programme, Telford, H.M. Revenue and Customs.
- Peter Leslie Smith. For services to the Mountain Search and Rescue Service in England and Wales.
- Ms Emma Solomon, Founder, Silver Surfers' Day and Managing Director, Digital Unite. For services to Digital Inclusion.
- John Joseph William Speirs, Vice-President (Asia), Ensinger. For services to Advanced Material and Manufacturing in Wales.
- Dr. Amanda Squires, Physiotherapist. For services to Healthcare for Older People in London.
- Lesley, Mrs. Steele, Headteacher, St. Aidan's Church of England Primary, Gateshead. For services to Education.
- Rita, Mrs. Stringfellow, Trustee, Family Rights Group and the Daycare Trust. For services to Children and Families.
- Paul Strong, lately Headteacher, William Farr (Church of England) Comprehensive School, Welton, Lincolnshire. For services to Education.
- Gary Sullivan. For services to the Regeneration of Thames Gateway South Essex.
- Dr. Nina Sweet, Organics Sector Specialist, Waste and Resources Action Programme. For services to the Waste Industry.
- Hilary Edwena Thomas, Registrar and Director, Full-Time Curriculum, National Film and Television School. For services to Higher Education.
- Miss Peninah Thomson. For services to Women and Equality.
- Nicholas Tooby, Senior Manager, Personal Tax Operations, Leicester, H.M. Revenue and Customs.
- William Morell Lindon Travers, Chief Executive Officer, Born Free Foundation. For services to Wildlife Conservation and Animal Welfare.
- Peter Trevelyan, Expert Information Technology Analyst, Meteorological Office.
- William James Piper Trevitt, Co-founder, the Ballet Boyz. For services to Dance.
- Richard Charles Turner, Senior Inspector of Ancient Monuments, Welsh Government.
- Belle, Mrs. Tutaev. Founder and Trustee, Pre-School Learning Alliance. For services to Children and Families.
- Ms Wendy Arnon Van Den Hende, lately Chief Executive, Personal Finance Education Group. For services to Finance Education.
- Edward Vernon, Board Member, Invest NI. For services to Economic Development in Northern Ireland.
- Patrick Phillip Vernon. For services to the Reduction of Health Inequalities for Ethnic Minorities.
- Ernest Herbert Vincent, Chief Executive, Queen Elizabeth II Conference Centre Executive Agency. For services to the Exhibition Industry.
- Edmond William Warner. For services to British Athletics.
- Lawrence Waterman, Head of Health and Safety, Olympic Delivery Authority. For services to Occupational Health and Safety.
- Philip John Weaver, Chairman, Professional Golfers Association. For services to Sport.
- Professor Jeffrey Weeks, Research Professor, London South Bank University. For services to Social Science.
- Ms Jacqueline Westlake, Team Leader, Big Society Team, Department for Communities and Local Government.
- Ms Kim Julie White, Police Constable, Kent Police. For services to Policing and the Gypsy Community.
- Terry Bertram Wilkins, Strategic Volunteer and Project Co-ordinator, Dorset Police. For service to Policing.
- Graham Wilson. For services to the Retail Markets Industry.
- The Right Honourable Robert Rickaby Winter, lately Lord Provost of Glasgow. For services to Local Government and to the community in Glasgow.
- Linda, Mrs. Wishart, Head, Knowledge and Information Management, Department of Health and Government Head of Profession for Librarians and Information Specialists.
- Sarah Elizabeth, Mrs. Wolfensohn. For services to Animal Welfare.
- Albert Woods. For services to Canoeing.
- Mark Wright. For public service.
- Simon Alistair Wright, Director of Infrastructure and Utilities, Olympic Delivery Authority. For services to the Construction Industry.

Diplomatic Service and Overseas List

- Jonathan William Addis, lately Chairman, The British Malaysian Chamber of Commerce. For services to UK trade and investment.
- Reza Afshar, First Secretary Political, UK Mission to the United Nations, New York.
- John Ramsay Bremner, Senior Vice President, North East Asia, and Chairman, Unilever, Japan. For services to corporate social responsibility and to the community in Japan.
- Karel Mark Chichon, Co-Founder and Artistic Director, Gibraltar Philharmonic Society. For services to music and culture in Gibraltar.
- Diana Caroline Carew, Mrs. Colvin, lately Chair, Diplomatic Service Families Association. For services to Foreign and Commonwealth Office staff and family support.
- Ian Fraser Hirchfield, First Secretary, Foreign and Commonwealth Office.
- Peter John Hughes, lately H.M. Ambassador, Democratic People's Republic of Korea.
- Timothy Basil Hull, First Secretary, Foreign and Commonwealth Office.
- Alan Ralph Kell, Co-Chair, UK/China Eco Cities & Green Buildings Group. For services to UK/China collaboration in the development and delivery of sustainable buildings.
- (Anne) Judith, Mrs. Kerr, Writer and Illustrator. For services to children's literature and holocaust education.
- Ian McNeill, lately Chief of Staff, Provincial Reconstruction Team, Helmand, Afghanistan. For services to stabilisation and development in Afghanistan.
- Brendan John McSharry, M.B.E., Director, British Council, Iraq.
- Peter Guy Michelmore, lately Chairman, British Business Group, Abu Dhabi, UAE. For services to British business interests and to the British community in Abu Dhabi.
- Professor Catherine Anne Morgan, Director, British School, Athens, Greece. For services to classical scholarship.
- Miloska, Lady Nott, Charity Trustee. For services to humanitarian work, particularly to Bosnia- Herzegovina.
- Stanley George Platt, President, 'Light into Europe'. For services to the visually impaired in Romania.
- Luise Ingrid Schafer, lately Vice Chair, Abacus Lighting Ltd, China. For services to British business in China.
- Bashir Bernard Siman, Board Adviser, Al Farida Investments LLC, Abu Dhabi, UAE. For services to British financial services in Abu Dhabi.
- Angela, Mrs. Slater, Head, Legalisation Office, Consular Directorate, Foreign and Commonwealth Office.
- Elmore Stoutt, lately Member, Legislative Council, British Virgin Islands. For services to education and to the community in the British Virgin Islands.
- Dr. Elizabeth Mary Frances Teague, Research Analyst, Eastern Europe and Central Asia Directorate, Foreign and Commonwealth Office.
- Dr. Alan George Walton, Founding President, National Committee on Bioscience Innovations. For services to the UK biotechnology industry.

==== Member of the Order of the British Empire (MBE) ====
- Hamish Telfer Adam. For services to Karate.
- Professor John Charles Adams, Vice-President, National Governors' Association and School Governor, Harrogate High School. For services to Education.
- Richard Arthur Adams. For voluntary service to SSAFA Forces Help in the West Midlands.
- William Adie, Welfare Officer, Methlick Royal British Legion. For services to the community in Methlick, Aberdeenshire.
- Richard Thomas Adlem. For services to the community in Sixpenny Handley, Dorset.
- John Richard Akker, Executive Secretary, Council for Assisting Refugee Academics. For services to Academic Refugees and Exiles.
- Kenneth Allan. For services to the Royal Society of Chemistry.
- Ms Muriel Rose Allen. For services to the community in Southsea, Hampshire.
- Kenneth Reginald Allinson, Chief Executive, Richmond YMCA. For services to Young People in Richmond, North Yorkshire.
- Professor Nigel Martin Allinson, Distinguished Professor of Image Engineering, University of Lincoln. For services to Engineering.
- Miss Margaret Alphonsi, Saracens and England Rugby. For services to Rugby.
- Robert Arnott. Founder Member, Northern Ireland Kidney Research Fund and Transplant Games. For services to Kidney Research in Northern Ireland.
- Alex Arthur. For services to Boxing.
- Derek Ashcroft, J.P., For services to the community in Skelmersdale, Lancashire.
- Peter Nigel Ashcroft, Project Director, Next Generation Broadband Cornwall. For services to Economic Regeneration in Cornwall.
- Miss April Ashley, Actress and Campaigner. For services to Transgender Equality.
- Qari Muhammad Asim, Member, Mosques and Imams National Advisory Board. For services to Inter-Faith Relations and the community in Leeds.
- Rachel Mary, Mrs. Axford, Leader, Treborth Riding for the Disabled. For services to Disabled People in North Wales.
- Rex Blundell Ayers. For services to the community in Woolton, Merseyside.
- Miss Jenna Bailey, WorldSkills Workshop Supervisor for Beauty Therapy at London 2011 and Curriculum Manager, Ashton Community Science College. For services to Skills.
- Miss Judith Bainbridge. For services to the community in Frosterley, Durham.
- Stephen John Baker, lately Head, Royal Society for the Prevention of Accidents, Wales. For services to Road Safety in Wales.
- Ms Eileen Banton, Police Constable, Derbyshire Constabulary. For services to the community.
- Miss Patricia Irene Barrett, Governor, Bedford College. For services to Further Education.
- Doreen, Mrs. Batchelor, Foster Carer, London Borough of Islington. For services to Children and Families. James Batchelor, Foster Carer, London Borough of Islington. For services to Children and Families.
- David Richard Beech. For services to Philately.
- Ivor Leonard Beeks, J.P. For services to Football and to the community in High Wycombe, Buckinghamshire.
- James Beirne, Chief Executive, Live Theatre. For services to Theatre.
- Dorothy, Mrs. Bell. For services to the community in Brixton, London.
- Matthew Bell, Chief Superintendent, Metropolitan Police Service. For services to Policing.
- John Ashford Bennett. For services to the UK Marine Industry.
- Stephen Bennett, Youth Worker and Creator of Motiv8ion Programme, Blackpool, Lancashire. For services to Young People and Youth Employment.
- Rebecca, Mrs. Benneyworth, Chartered Accountant. For services to the Tax Profession.
- Roy James Bentham, lately Chapter Clerk and Chief Executive of Lincoln Cathedral. For services to Lincoln Cathedral.
- Francesca, Mrs. Berriman, Chief Executive, Chartered Institute of Architectural Technologists. For services to the Architectural Technology Profession.
- John Alfred Best, Chair, Ulster Farmers' Union Seeds and Cereals Committee. For services to the Agri-Food Industry in Northern Ireland.
- Jonathan Betts, Senior Curator of Horology, National Maritime Museum. For services to Horology.
- Ellen, Mrs. Bianchini. Founder, The Spark Children's Player Arts Festival. For services to the Arts.
- Christopher George Bielby, Director of New Business, Scotia Gas Networks. For services to Gas Safety.
- John Blakeley, Sculptor. For services to Sculpting and to Charity.
- Frederick Clifford Blampied, Campaigner, Inland Waterways Association. For services to the Inland Waterways.
- Russell Graham Blatcher, Higher Officer, IT Development Team, Personal Tax Customer Operations, HM Revenue and Customs.
- Mary, Mrs. Bliszczak, School Catering Training Co-ordinator and Cookery Volunteer, Cambridgeshire County Council. For services to School Food.
- Patrick Bogues, Chair, Ulster Supported Employment Limited. For services to People with Disabilities in Northern Ireland.
- Ms Lara Bohinc, Jewellery and Accessories Designer. For services to the Fashion Industry.
- Olufemi, Mrs. Bola, Director, Employability and Student Enterprise, University of East London. For services to Diversity.
- Elizabeth, Mrs. Bolland, Guiding Development Adviser and lately District Commissioner, Evesham Guides, Worcestershire. For services to Young People.
- Lesley Catherine, Mrs. Booth, Head of Lifelong Learning, University of York. For services to Higher Education.
- Sheena, Mrs. Booth. For voluntary service in Peterhead, Aberdeenshire.
- Ian James Bothwell. Founder, Crossfire Trust. For services to the community in South Armagh, Northern Ireland.
- Michael James Bowyer. For services to Flower Arranging and to Charity.
- Margaret Irene, Mrs. Boyd. For services to the community in Northern Ireland.
- Raymond Patrick Boyle, Motor Transport Co-Ordinator, Police Service of Northern Ireland. For services to the Police.
- Andrea Marie, Mrs. Bradbury, Inspector, Lancashire Constabulary. For services to Policing.
- Keith Brandwood, Lecturer, Blackburn College. For services to Further Education.
- Ms Jean Binta Breeze, Poet. For services to Literature.
- Ms Sharon Brokenshire. Founder, South London Special League. For services to Disability Sport.
- Ms Wendy Brook, Tutor, Pathfinder LearnDirect Centre, Barnstaple. For services to Adult Learning.
- Alan William Paul Brown, Special Constabulary Chief Officer, Devon and Cornwall Constabulary. For services to Policing and the community.
- Verity Frances Montagu, Mrs. Brown. For services to the community in Salisbury, Wiltshire.
- Professor Ann Buchanan, Professor of Social Work, University of Oxford. For services to Social Science.
- Robert Anthony Buckby, lately Assistant Headteacher and School Leader, Hastings High School, Hinckley, Leicestershire. For services to Education.
- Diana, Mrs. Burroughs, Pastoral Care Manager, West Earlham Junior School, Norwich. For services to Education.
- Mary, Mrs. Butcher, Basket Maker. For services to Basket Making
- Miss Susan Byrom, Chair, Hackenthorpe Community Centre, Sheffield. For services to the community in Sheffield.
- Ivy Clara, Mrs. Cakebread. For services to the communities in Dadford and Stowe, Buckinghamshire.
- Christopher Capon. For service to Local Government and the community in Hythe, Kent.
- Joan, Mrs. Carmichael. For services to the Hospitality Industry and to the community in Northern Ireland.
- Ms Sally Beryl Carr, Director, LGBT Youth North West. For services to Young People.
- Sally Anne Sweeney, Mrs. Carroll. Founder and Mentor, Transport for Sick Children. For services to Child Care.
- The Reverend Celia Carter, Trustee, Seven Springs Foundation, Avening, Gloucestershire. For services to Children and the community.
- Kim, Mrs. Carter, Venous Thromboembolism Nurse Specialist, Portsmouth Hospital NHS Trust. For services to Nursing.
- Margaret Richardson, Mrs. Carter, Councillor, Newcastle City Council. For services to Local Government.
- Glyn Catley, Governor, Coleg Llandrillo, Colwyn Bay, Conwy. For services to Further Education in North Wales.
- David Channing, Foster Carer, Plymouth, Devon. For services to Children and Families.
- Helen, Mrs. Channing, Foster Carer, Plymouth, Devon. For services to Children and Families.
- Colin Chapman. Founder, In-Deep. For charitable services to the community in South London.
- James Chapman, Chair, National Federation of Young Farmers' Clubs. For services to Health and Safety in the Farming Industry.
- Keith Nicolas Chapman, WorldSkills Ambassador for Landscape Gardening at London 2011 and Founder, Keith Chapman Landscapes. For services to Skills.
- David Nisbet Cheetham, lately Diocesan Registrar of St. Albans. For services to Ecclesiastical Law and to charity in Hertfordshire.
- Paul Michael Cheshire, Bikesafe Co-ordinator, North Wales Police. For services to Policing.
- George Herbert Chesterton. For services to the community in Malvern, Worcestershire.
- Kevin Andrew Christian, Volunteer Operation Manager, Ramsay Lifeboat Station. For services to Maritime Safety.
- William Eric Christie, Church Elder, St. Columba's Parish Church. For services to the community in Glenrothes, Fife.
- Paul Chynoweth, Higher Officer, Information Management Service, H.M. Revenue and Customs.
- Thomas Charles Cleator, lately Director, Alternative Futures Group Board, Liverpool. For services to people with Learning Disabilities and Mental Health Conditions.
- Penelope Jane, Mrs. Cleobury. For services to the community in Cambridge.
- Peter Clowes, Trustee and Curator, Wigston Framework Knitters Museum. For services to Heritage.
- Lieutenant Colonel Harry Beckhough-Coburg. For Political and Public Service.
- Priscilla Elizabeth Ellen, Mrs. Colchester. For services to the Eastern Counties Farm Crisis Network Farming Charity.
- Arthur Richard John Cole. For services to the community in King's Lynn, Norfolk.
- Miss Emma Elizabeth Colyer, Director, Body & Soul Charity, London. For services to People affected by HIV.
- Kenneth Combes, Engineering Site Manager, Lynx Simulator Facility, RNAS Yeovilton, CAE (UK) Ltd. For services to Defence.
- Patricia, Mrs. Connell, Healthcare Assistant, Bradford Teaching Hospital NHS Foundation Trust. For services to the NHS.
- Ms Frances Margaret Cook, lately Consultant Speech and Language Therapist, Michael Palin Centre for Stammering Children. For services to Speech Therapy.
- Robert Cook. For services to Older People in Whitburn, West Lothian.
- Dr. Ronald Cookson. Founder, Mills Archive Trust. For services to Heritage.
- Douglas John Coombes. For services to Music.
- Miss Rose Anita Coppola. Founder, Small Steps School for Parents. For services to Special Education.
- Ann, Mrs. Corcoran. For services to the Coronial Service in Wiltshire and Swindon and to Bereaved Families.
- Dr. Lorna Cork, Creator and Leader, Yes We Will Leadership and Achievement Programme, Birmingham. For services to Education.
- Jessie, Mrs. Corson. For services to the community in Mallaig, Inverness-shire.
- Keith Raymond Jenkin Cottell. For services to Swimming and Lifesaving.
- Anthony Coumbe, Foster Carer, City of Westminster. For services to Children and Families.
- Maureen, Mrs. Coumbe, Foster Carer, City of Westminster. For services to Children and Families.
- Janet Alison, Mrs. Croney, Faculty Director, Cultural and Creative Studies, Richmond Adult Community College. For services to Adult and Further Education.
- Felix Cross, Artistic Director, NITRO. For services to Musical Theatre.
- Irene Elizabeth, Mrs. Cross, County Vice-President, Bristol and South Gloucestershire Girl Guides. For services to Young People.
- Professor Heather Cubie, lately Research and Development Director, NHS Lothian. For services to Healthcare Science in Scotland.
- Barbara Mary, Mrs. Cullimore, Volunteer, National Association of Decorative and Fine Arts. For services to Heritage.
- John Alfrey Culver. For services to the community in St. Ives, Cornwall.
- Brian John Cummings, Chairman of Governors, St. Anselm's College and Governor, Birkenhead High School, Merseyside. For services to Education.
- Gwendolyn, Mrs. Daley. For services to the community in Coventry.
- Judy, Mrs. Davidson, lately Executive Officer, Jobcentre Plus, Department for Work and Pensions.
- Jane, Mrs. Davies, Deputy Director of Operations, Whipps Cross University Hospital NHS Trust. For services to Healthcare.
- Professor Kevin Davies, T.D., Chair of Nursing and Disaster Healthcare. For services to Healthcare Disaster Management.
- John Davis, Fundraiser, Northumberland. For services to Charity.
- Susan Catherine, Mrs. Davis. For services to the Harriet Davis Seaside Holiday Trust and to Disabled People and their Families.
- Gillian Rosemary, Mrs. Dawson, Guide Leader, 2nd Shortland Guides and Mentor, Girlguiding UK. For services to Young People.
- Susanna, Mrs. Dawson, lately Chair, National Childminding Association. For services to Children and Families.
- Sarah Louise, Mrs. De Carvalho. For services to Happy Child, Brazil.
- Ms Lorraine Deschamps. For services to Sport and Diversity.
- Ms Gladys Dickson. For services to Parliament and the communities in London and Ghana.
- Michael Sean Gilmour Diffin, Police Constable, Wiltshire Police. For services to Policing.
- Philip Charles Dingle, Police Patrol Officer, Devon and Cornwall Constabulary. For services to Policing.
- Luke Donald, Golfer. For services to Golf.
- Ms Annette Dorsey. For services to the Riding for the Disabled Association at Harrogate and Stockeld Park in West Yorkshire.
- David Dougan. For services to the community in Gatehouse of Fleet, Dumfries and Galloway.
- Alison, Mrs. Drake, Chair, Castleford Heritage Trust, West Yorkshire. For services to Community-led Regeneration in Castleford.
- Louis John Drake. For voluntary service to Horticulture.
- Sandra, Mrs. Drew. Founder, Stour Valley Arts. For services to the Arts.
- Keith Frederick Drodge, Grade C1, Ministry of Defence.
- Peter Leslie Kennan Dury. For services to Groundsmanship. Daryl Eagle. For public service.
- Dr. Rodney Frederick Eastwood, lately College Secretary and Clerk to the Council and Court, Imperial College London. For services to Higher Education.
- Carole, Mrs. Eaton, Chair of Governors, Myers Grove School and Shooter's Grove School, Sheffield, South Yorkshire. For services to Education.
- Mark Edwards, Police Constable, Metropolitan Police Service. For services to Policing and to Charity.
- Ms Melinda Edwards, Consultant Clinical Paediatric Psychologist, St Thomas's Hospital. For services to Children with Chronic and Life-threatening Medical conditions.
- Judith Mary, Mrs. Elliott. For services to the community in Morley, West Yorkshire.
- Norman Victor Elliott. For services to the community in South Cave, East Yorkshire.
- Eiddwen, Mrs. Evans. For charitable services to The Teenage Cancer Trust.
- Dr. Jeremy Evans. Force Medical Officer, Lancashire Constabulary. For services to Policing.
- Simon Harvey Evans, Managing Director, Moflash Ltd. For services to International Trade.
- Francis Fallan. For services to the community in Lanarkshire.
- Roger Anthony Farbey, Head of Library and Knowledge Services, British Dental Association, London. For services to Dentistry and Dental Information.
- Abdolkarim Fatehi, Managing Director, United Corporation Ltd. For services to International Trade.
- Mustafa Field. For services to Ethnic Cohesion and the community in London.
- Susan Treharne, Mrs. Fila, Key Stage 3 Co-ordinator, Crowdys Hill Special School, Swindon, Wiltshire. For services to Education.
- Laurence Michael Finch. For services to the East Surrey Talking Newspaper Association and to the community in Reigate, Surrey.(Deceased: To be dated 21 May 2012.)
- Andrew Findlay, Helmsman, Royal National Lifeboat Institution. For services to Maritime Safety.
- Peter Maurice Fisher. For services to the community in Seend, Wiltshire.
- Nigel Brent Fitzpatrick, Chairman of Governors, Phoenix School and School Governor in the City of Bradford. For services to Education.
- Miss Kay Foggon, Lecturer, School of Lifestyle, Newcastle College. For services to Further Education.
- Omar Christopher Lye Fook, Soul Singer and Songwriter. For services to Music.
- Ms Patricia Ann Foreman, Chief Executive, Food Northwest. For services to the Food and Drink Industry.
- John Fox. For services to the Arts.
- Trevor Francis, Station Master, Aberdour Railway Station. For services to the community in Aberdour, Fife.
- John Fortune Fraser. For services to Business and to Charity.
- Michael David Freeman, lately Curator, Ceredigion Museum. For services to Heritage in Ceredigion and to Museums in Wales.
- Henry Frydenson. For service to the community in North West London.
- Colonel Simon John Furness, Chair, Gunsgreen House Trust. For services to the community in Eyemouth, Scottish Borders.
- Ms Jean Mary Galitzine, Vice-President, PHAB. For services to Young People.
- John Anthony Galvin. For services to the Environment.
- Timothy John Charles Gardiner. For services to the Tourism Industry.
- Glyn Gardner, Special Constable, Warwickshire Police. For services to Policing.
- Kaye Valerie, Mrs. Gardner. For services to the voluntary sector in Altrincham.
- Ms Judith Garfield, Director, Eastside Community Heritage. For services to Community Heritage.
- Lieutenant Commander John Marstan Gawley. For services to Hockey.
- Paul Michael Gayler, Chef. For services to Hospitality and Charity.
- Commodore Ian Gibb. For voluntary service to Maritime charities.
- Councillor John Gibbin. For services to the community in West Wales.
- Jean, Mrs. Gibson, Northern Ireland Manager, Care for the Family. For services to the community in Northern Ireland.
- Janette, Mrs. Gilbert, Senior Charge Nurse, Golden Jubilee National Hospital. For services to Nursing and to Vulnerable People in Ayrshire. Rita Margaret, Mrs. Giles. For services to the community in the London Borough of Barking and Dagenham.
- Dr. Charles Michael Gillett. For services to Education and to the community in Plymouth, Devon.
- Thomas Gilpin, Managing Director, Gilfresh Produce. For services to the Agriculture Industry in Northern Ireland.
- George Glass, Honorary Life President and Founder, BlindVoiceUK. For services to Blind and Partially-Sighted People.
- Robert Charles Glossop, Founder, the March Foundation for SEN and Trustee, Dove House SEN Secondary School. For services to Special Educational Needs.
- Ms Elizabeth Ann Gooch, Founder and Chief Executive, EG Solutions plc. For services to the Financial Services Sector.
- Moosa Gora, Muslim Chaplain, H.M. Prison Full Sutton. For services to Faith and Diversity in the Prison Service.
- Ms Octavia Goredema, Founder and Managing Director, Twenty Ten Club. For services to Black Female Entrepreneurs.
- Stephen Goulden, Administrative Officer, Jobcentre Plus, Department for Work and Pensions.
- The Reverend Cyril Handel Grant. For services to the Samaritans in Bristol.
- Dr. Philip Anthony Green, Principal General Practitioner, Pembroke House Surgery, Paignton, Devon. For services to Healthcare.
- Brian Grimwood. For services to Frensham Pond Sailability for People with Disabilities in Farnham, Surrey.
- Ms Madeleine Groves, Senior Scientific Officer, Royal Botanic Gardens, Kew. For services to the Protection of Flora.
- Christine, Mrs. Gurney, Senior Executive Officer, Jobcentre Plus, Department for Work and Pensions.
- Carlton Harold Guy. For services to African Diaspora Dance.
- Dr. Margaret Paula Guy, Palliative Care Physician, Phyllis Tuckwell Hospice, Farnham. For services to Healthcare.
- Jason Mark Hadden. For services to Pro Bono Legal Services.
- Judith, Mrs. Hall, Higher Executive Officer, Jobcentre Plus, Department for Work and Pensions.
- Nicholas Hamer, Grade C2, Ministry of Defence.
- Alexander John Hamil. For services to Football and to Visually Impaired People in Wolverhampton, West Midlands.
- Alan Alexander David Hamilton, T.D., lately Unit Manager, H.M.Young Offenders Institute Polmont, Scottish Prison Service.
- Councillor Mouna Hamitouche. For services to the community and Local Government.
- Elizabeth Ann Verena, Mrs. Hanbury, D.L., Trustee and President, Chailey Heritage School, East Sussex. For services to Special Education.
- John Harding, Volunteer, Metropolitan Police Service. For services to Policing.
- Phyllis, Mrs. Harding. For services to the community in Wherwell, Hampshire.
- Trevor Hargreaves Hardy, Northumberland National Park Voluntary Ranger.
- Albert Ernest Harris. For services to the community in Swansea.
- Glenn William Harris, lately Deputy Chief Executive, East Midlands Development Agency. For services to Business in the East Midlands.
- Teresa Josephine (Tess), Mrs. Hart. For services to the community in Carlisle, Cumbria.
- Trevor Alexander Hassin, Head of Customer & Standards, Driver & Vehicle Agency, Department of the Environment for Northern Ireland.
- Andrew Hatton, Founder and Technical Director, Global Anodes (UK) Ltd. For services to Industry.
- Trevor Hayward, Technical Manager, University of Birmingham. For services to Scientific Research.
- Robert Jonathan Hegan. For services to Economic Development and to the Construction Industry in Northern Ireland.
- Hugh Henderson. For voluntary service to the International community.
- Linda Lilian, Mrs. Henderson, Grade E1, Ministry of Defence.
- Paul Fisken Henery, Caseworker, Office for Security and Counter-Terrorism.
- Dr. Helen Margaret Herbert. For services to the General Practice Profession in Wales.
- Bruce Hewison. For services to Tourism in Northumberland.
- Dr. Wendy Elizabeth Austin Hewitt, Journalist and Broadcaster. For services to Broadcasting and the community in Northern Ireland.
- Bonnie Suzanne, Mrs. Hill, D.L., lately County Commissioner, Essex North East Girlguiding. For services to the community in Essex.
- Joy Janette, Mrs. Hill, Senior Specialist Physiotherapist, Defence Medical Rehabilitation Centre.
- Patricia Christine, Mrs. Hillman. For services to the Scout Movement in Monmouthshire.
- Gillian, Mrs. Hinson, Head of Academic Affairs, Institute of Education. For services to Higher Education and to Teacher Education.
- Professor Clifford Allan Hobson. For services to the community in Liverpool and Rwanda.
- John Hollingworth, Exhibitions Manager, School of Oriental and African Studies. For services to Higher Education and Culture.
- Richard Holway, Chairman, The Prince's Trust Leadership Groups. For services to Young People.
- Lieutenant Colonel Helen Elizabeth Homewood, T.D., Grade C2, Ministry of Defence.
- Jonathon Hope, lately Chairman, Kidney Disease Modernisation Initiative. For services to Kidney Disease Patients.
- Norma, Mrs. Hornby, Chairman, Canal Boat Adventure Project and Vice-Chair of Governors, Hallwood Park School, Warrington. For services to Children and Young People.
- Ms Heike Horsburgh, lately Chief Executive, Young Cumbria, Keswick, Cumbria. For services to Young People.
- Councillor David Anthony Horton. For services to the community in York.
- Robert Howard, Managing Director, Wilson and Wylie Contracts Ltd. For services to the Wall and Floor Tile Industry.
- Muriel Joyce, Mrs. Howe. For services to the National Association of Widows.
- Robert James Howells, Volunteer, British Trust for Ornithology. For services to Ornithology in Swansea and West Glamorgan.
- Keith Richard Hunt, Complementary Therapy Co-ordinator, Royal Free Hospital, London. For services to Complementary Therapy.
- Brian Rodney Hunter, Special Sergeant, Lincolnshire Police. For services to Policing.
- Patrick Robert William Hurst, Managing Director, Munster Simms Engineering Ltd. For services to the Northern Ireland Business Community.
- Ashuk Hussain, J.P., Grade C1, Ministry of Defence.
- Eleanore Margaret, Mrs. Huston, Fundraiser, Royal National Lifeboat Institution. For services to Maritime Safety.
- Marion, Mrs. Hutchinson. For services to the community in Mickleton, County Durham.
- Eugene Incerti, Director of Skills Competitions, National Apprenticeship Service. For services to Skills.
- Christine, Mrs. Ingham, Fundraiser, Leukaemia and Lymphoma Research, Lutterworth, Leicestershire. For services to Leukaemia Research.
- Ms Stephanie Ann Crossley Ingham, Company Secretary, Association of Suppliers to the British Clothing Industry. For services to Business.
- Gary Irvine, Grade D, Ministry of Defence.
- Mrs. Margaret Jackson. For services to Netball.
- Peter Harry Jackson. For charitable services in Lancashire.
- Agnes Rosemary, Mrs. James, lately Headteacher, St. Mellons Church in Wales Primary School, Cardiff. For services to Primary Education.
- David Benjamin James, Goalkeeper. For services to Football and Charity.
- Martin James. For voluntary service to Angling, Conservation and to Charity.
- Dr. Michael Leonard James. For services to the community in Sidmouth, Devon.
- Joanna, Mrs. Jeffery, Proprietor, Read Successfully. For services to the community in the South West.
- Jonathan Lyndon Jelley, J.P. For voluntary service to SSAFA Forces Help.
- Christopher Clive Bentley Jervis. For services to the community in South Liverpool, Merseyside.
- Dr. Mark Denman-Johnson, Director, Lighthouse Medical Limited, Isle of Wight. For services to Primary Care.
- Martin Johnson, lately Head of Corporate Affairs, Quality Assurance Agency for HE. For services to Higher Education.
- Brendan Johnston, Chief Executive, Northern Ireland Social Care Council. For services to Social Care in Northern Ireland.
- Robert Lowther Johnston, Chief Executive, Cumbrian Chamber of Commerce. For services to Business in Cumbria.
- Barbara Joan, Mrs. Johnstone. For services to Riding for the Disabled.
- Ann, Mrs. Jones. For services to Occupational Health and Safety in Swansea and West Wales.
- Ms Emma Jones, Founder, Enterprise Nation. For services to Enterprise and Homebased Working.
- Frederick Charles Jones, Honorary Alderman, London Borough of Barking and Dagenham.
- Joy, Mrs. Jones, Clinical Lead, Specialist Eating Disorders Service, Aneurin Bevan Health Board. For services to Healthcare.
- Lesley Jones. For charitable services to the Noah's Ark Appeal and the community in Powys.
- Leslie Jones. For services to the community in Northern Ireland.
- Charles Peter Judge, lately Director of Legal Services and Procurement, One North East. For services to the Regional Development Agency Network and the North East Region.
- Miss Lynda Margaret Kappes, Assistant Headteacher, Middlewich County High School, Cheshire. For services to Education.
- Richard Anthony Kearney, Police Community Support Officer, South Yorkshire. For services to Policing and the community.
- Joan, Mrs. Burney Keatings. For services to the Arts and Media in Northern Ireland.
- Janet, Mrs. Keauffling. For services to Homeless and Vulnerable People in Swansea.
- Dr. Zelalem Kebede, Regional Director, Council of Ethnic Minority and Voluntary Sector Organisations. For services to the community in London and the South East.
- Gloria, Mrs. Keene. For services to the community in Inkpen, Berkshire.
- Judith, Mrs. Kemp, Design Director, Firmdale Hotel. For services to the Hotel Industry and Charity.
- Timothy Kemp, Managing Director, Firmdale Hotel. For services to the Hotel Industry and Charity.
- Deana, Mrs. Kenward, President and Founder, Addison's Disease Self Help Group, Surrey. For services to people with Addison's Disease and their Families.
- Adele Margretta, Mrs. Kerr, Principal, Enniskillen Integrated Primary School. For services to Education.
- Steven Khaireh. For services to Young People in Cardiff.
- Walayat Khokhar. For services to Muslim Aid.
- Michael Kinghan, Chair, Whittington and Fisherwick Environment Group. For services to Sustainability and Biodiversity in Staffordshire and the West Midlands.
- Miss Helen Kirkpatrick, Chair, Crumlin Together. For services to the community in Northern Ireland.
- Sylvia Clare, Mrs. Menzies-Kitchin, Founder, James Menzies-Kitchin Trust. For services to Drama.
- Christine, Mrs. Knighton, Founder, Mick Knighton Mesothelioma Foundation. For services to Mesothelioma Research.
- John Knowles, Systems Manager, Information Services and Information Systems, Scottish Government.
- Professor Gunther Rolf Kress, Professor of Semiotics and Education, Institute of Education, University of London. For services to Scholarship.
- Ruth, Mrs. Lapworth, Director, Laboratory Medicine, East Kent Hospitals NHS Foundation Trust. For services to Healthcare.
- Ms Sian Larrington, Children's Centre Leader, Bowthorpe, West Earlham and Costessy Children's Centre. For services to Children.
- Martyn Edward Lass, Enabling Works Project Manager for London 2012, Atkins. For services to the Construction Industry.
- Reginald Law, Neighbourhood Watch Activist. For services to Community Safety in St Albans, Hertfordshire.
- Pauline Anne, Mrs. Laybourne, Executive Officer, Strategy, Skills and Planning Unit, Crime and Policing Group, Home Office. For services to Police Families.
- David Hedley John Layte. For voluntary service to Seafarers United Kingdom, Suffolk.
- Jocelyn, Mrs. Ledgister, Higher Officer, Public Bodies Group, Enforcement and Compliance, London, H.M. Revenue and Customs.
- Charles Brandon Theodosius Boughton-Leigh. For services to the community in Mid and West Sussex.
- James Leitch, HR Director, Northstone (NI) Ltd. For services to Health and Safety in Northern Ireland.
- Councillor John Letford, lately Lord Provost of Dundee City Council. For services to Local Government.
- Linda, Mrs. Lewis, Senior Officer, Stakeholder Engagement Team Leader, Benefits and Credits, Washington Tyne and Wear, H.M. Revenue and Customs.
- Winifred Patricia, Mrs. Lewis, Principal, Stafford School of Dance. For services to Dance.
- Derek Lickorish, Chair, Fuel Poverty Advisory Group. For services to the Fuel Poor.
- Jean, Mrs. Liddell, Access and Support Officer, South Eastern Regional College. For services to Education in Northern Ireland.
- James Lingwood, Co-Director, Artangel. For services to the Arts.
- Mary Marguarita, Mrs. Lock. For voluntary service to the Royal Naval Association.
- Janet Mary, Mrs. Lockyer, lately Occupational Therapist, Liverpool. For services to People with Disabilities.
- David Edward Loftus, Grade D, Ministry of Defence.
- Ms Eve Lom, Founder, Eve Lom Skincare. For services to the Cosmetics Industry.
- Joseph Longthorne. For charitable services.
- Lesley, Mrs. Lopez, Head, Patient and Public Involvement, Watford General Hospital. For services to the NHS.
- Maureen, Mrs. Lorimer, lately Headteacher, Calaiswood School, Fife. For services to Special Education.
- Anthony Lowe, Founder, Fareshare. For services to the Relief of Food Poverty.
- Margaret, Mrs. Lund. For services to Education and to the community in Fleetwood, Lancashire.
- Peter Graham Lusher. For services to the community in Horsham, West Sussex.
- Philip Arthur Lyons, Co-ordinator, Mansfield Area Strategic Partnership. For services to the community in Mansfield, Nottinghamshire.
- Dr. Sheena Maberly, Manager E, H.M. Prison Kirklevington Grange. For services to Her Majesty's Prison Service.
- Reginald James Magowan, Chairman, Board of Governors, Grosvenor Grammar School, Belfast. For services to Education in Northern Ireland.
- Ms Ulite Malcolm, Chaplaincy Volunteer, H.M. Prison Birmingham. For services to Prisoners and their Families.
- Miss Elizabeth Anne Marley, Head, Children's Youth and School Library Services, Hampshire County Council. For services to Local Government.
- David William Marsh. For services to the Surveying Profession and to the community in Bristol.
- Barbara Anne, Mrs. Marshall. For services to the community in Chesterfield, Derbyshire.
- Graham Marson, Vice-Chairman of Governors, Rushcliffe School, Nottingham. For services to Education.
- Alyson Lynne, Mrs. Martin, Chief Executive, Somerset Care Group. For services to Care Services.
- Ivor Martin, Residential Governor 5, Northern Ireland Prison Service, Department of Justice, Northern Ireland Executive.
- Kenneth Martin, Night Network Traffic Controller, London Buses. For services to London's Buses.
- Ms Loraine Frances Martins, lately Head of Equality, Inclusion, Employment and Skill, Olympic Delivery Authority.
- Dr. Christopher Michael Mason, Chairman, The Clyde Maritime Trust. For services to the Tourism Industry in Scotland.
- Lucy Maria Ann, Mrs. Mason, Personal Assistant, Commercial and Customer Strategy Directorate, Land Registry.
- Henry (Harry) McCullough, Deputy Principal Officer, Further Education Division, Department for Employment and Learning, Northern Ireland Executive.
- Roger George McCune, Regulator, General Qualifications in Northern Ireland. For services to Education in Northern Ireland.
- Keir Austin McDonald, Founder, EduCare. For services to Children.
- Dr. Lori Barbara McElroy, Director, Sust. For services to Sustainable Building Design.
- Robert Joseph McFerran, Chairman, Board of Governors of Regent House Grammar School and of Loughries Primary School. For services to Education in Northern Ireland.
- Clare, Mrs. McGartland, Lead Allied Health Professions Consultant, Public Health Agency. For services to Healthcare in Northern Ireland.
- James Brian McGookin. For services to Community Development in Randalstown, Northern Ireland.
- Ms Agnes Marie McGowan, lately Health Improvement Lead (Tobacco). For services to Smoking Cessation.
- Malachy Vincent McGreevy, General Manager, Rail Services. For services to Public Transport in Northern Ireland.
- Colin McIntyre, County Secretary, Hertfordshire Scouts. For services to Young People.
- John James McLaren. For services to Older People and the community in Erskine, Renfrewshire.
- Peggy, Mrs. MacLeod, Nurse Consultant Diabetes, Western Isles. For services to Nursing and to People with Motor Neurone Disease in Scotland.
- Jennifer Anne, Mrs. McMahon, Playgroup Leader, Happy House Playgroup, Leyland, Lancashire. For services to Children and Families.
- Margaret Jane, Mrs. McMullen. For Public Service to the Electoral System in Northern Ireland.
- David McSweeney, Senior Officer, H.M. Young Offenders' Institution Brinsford. For services to Her Majesty's Prison Service.
- Colin Meadows, Higher Executive Officer, Jobcentre Plus, Department for Work and Pensions.
- Kerry Michael. For services to the restoration of Weston Super Mare's Pier.
- Miss Michelle Michael. For services to the restoration of Weston Super Mare's Pier.
- David Middleton, Senior Executive Officer, Jobcentre Plus, Department for Work and Pensions.
- Peter Middleton, Area Controller, Arriva, London. For services to London's Buses.
- Elizabeth Hamilton, Mrs. Milne. For services to the community in Rochdale.
- Andrew Thomas Minnion, Director, The Rix Centre, University of East London. For services to the Education of People with Special Needs.
- John Evan Moffoot. For services to young people and the community in Milton Keynes.
- Heather, Mrs. Monteverde, General Manager, Macmillan Cancer Support Northern Ireland. For services to Cancer Sufferers.
- Ms Anne Moore, Chief Educational Psychologist, London Borough of Croydon. For services to Special Needs Education.
- Michael Morris, Co-Director, Artangel. For services to the Arts.
- Professor Victor John Morris, lately Professor, Institute of Food Research. For services to Food Science.
- Grant Morrison, Comic Book Writer and Playwright. For services to Film and Literature.
- Robert David Morrow. For services to the Boys' Brigade Movement and to the community in Northern Ireland.
- Bettie, Mrs. Morton. For services to Community Arts.
- Robert Ian Moss. For services to St. John Ambulance in Merseyside.
- Marian Anne, Mrs. Moutray, Director, Educational Contracts and Business Development, School of Nursing and Midwifery, Queen's University Belfast. For services to Nursing Education.
- Miss June Mulroy, lately Executive Director, Pensions Regulator. For services to Pensions Regulation and Pensions Policy.
- Margaret, Mrs. Munford. For charitable services to POD in Wales and the UK.
- Professor Scott Murray, St. Columba's Hospice Chair of Palliative Care, The University of Edinburgh. For services to Medical Science.
- Catherine Majella, Mrs. Myers, HR Director, Metropolitan Police Service. For services to Policing.
- Hazel, Mrs. Myers, Foster Carer, Hampshire County Council. For services to Children and Families.
- John Myers, Foster Carer, Hampshire County Council. For services to Children and Families.
- Dr. Venkataswamy Narayana, General Practitioner, Thursby Surgery, Burnley, Lancashire. For services to General Practice.
- Anne-Marie, Mrs. Nash. For services to Farming.
- Elizabeth Ann Mary, Mrs. Nelson, Vice-President, Weldmar Hospicecare Trust, Dorset and Vice-Chairman, Motor Neurone Disease Association. For services to Palliative Care and the Motor Neurone Disease Association.
- Susan, Mrs. Newton. For services to the community in Heaton, Newcastle upon Tyne.
- Ms Julie Nicholson, Governor, Hertfordshire Partnership NHS Foundation Trust and Chief Executive, HertsMind Network. For services to Mental Health.
- Santokh Singh Nijran. For services to Community Cohesion in Nottingham.
- Ms Caroline Norbury, Chief Executive, Creative England Ltd. For services to the UK Film Industry.
- Paul O'Connor, Manager, Inchgarth Community Centre. For services to the community in Garthdee, Aberdeen.
- Melanie, Mrs. Odell. For services to the community in Haslemere, Surrey.
- Dina, Mrs. Officer, Senior Officer, H.M. Prison Wormwood Scrubs. For services to Her Majesty's Prison Service.
- Hugh Joseph Ogus. For services to Education through the Mary Hare School for the Deaf in Newbury and the Lighting Education Trust.
- Francis Joseph O'Hagan. For services to Local Government and the Traveller Community.
- Marion, Mrs. O'Leary, Foster Carer, Sunderland, Tyne and Wear. For services to Children and Families.
- Clive Mark Ongley. For services to Youth and Disability Sailing in Deptford, South East London.
- Ms Yvonne Orengo. For services to the Andrew Lees Trust, Southern Madagascar.
- Vanessa, Mrs. Orr, Long-term Foster Carer, Edinburgh City Council. For services to Vulnerable Children and Young People.
- Keith Orrell. For services to the community in Wrenthorpe, West Yorkshire.
- Miss Rosemary Anne Osbourne. For services to the Food Service Industry.
- Bernard Wilson Page. For voluntary service to the Royal British Legion in Derbyshire.
- Amanda, Mrs. Paine, Member, Chronic Respiratory Disease Group, National Council for Palliative Care. For services to Healthcare.
- Norman Arthur Pampling. For services to the community in Liskeard, Cornwall.
- Roger William Parkes, Governor, Skinner's School, Tunbridge Wells, Kent and Chairman of Finance Committee, Skinner's Kent Academy. For services to Education.
- Thomas John Parr. For services to Young People and to the community in Birmingham, West Midlands.
- Ralph Stanley Partner, B.E.M., Voluntary Worker, H.M. Prison Standford Hill. For public service.
- Miss Julietta Pascall, Executive Personal Secretary, Department for Business, Innovation and Skills.
- David William Pask, lately Teacher and Manager, EOTAS Tuition and Support, March, Cambridgeshire. For services to Education.
- Ronald George Pate, Pharmacist, West Midlands. For services to Hospital Pharmacy.
- Ms Susan Pawsey, Detective Sergeant, Metropolitan Police Service. For services to Policing.
- The Reverend Prebendary Robert Payne, Sessional Chaplain, H.M. Prison and Young Offenders Institution Swinfen Hall. For services to Her Majesty's Prison Service.
- Adam Peirson, WorldSkills Ambassador for Cooking at London 2011 and Sous Chef, Claridges, London. For services to Skills.
- Elisabeth Angela, Mrs. Perry. For charitable services through the Falkland Islands Memorial Chapel Trust and the Foundation for the Study of Infant Deaths.
- Catherine Joy, Mrs. Peters, Orthoptic Service Manager, Northern Health and Social Care Trust. For services to Healthcare in Northern Ireland.
- Richard Trafford Phillips, Executive Officer, Drivers Medical, Driver and Vehicle Licensing Agency.
- Councillor Joseph William Pike. For services to Local Government in Essex.
- Ms Petra Elyse Pipkin. For services to the community in Highwood, Essex.
- Brian Hector Potter, Chairman, Potters Leisure Resort. For services to Tourism.
- William Spencer David Powell, Secretary, Cardiff Astronomical Society. For services to Science in the community.
- Kenneth Alfred Powell, Convenor, British Standards Institute. For services to the UK Window Blind Industry.
- Francis George Prentice. For services to the community in Stratford-upon-Avon, Warwickshire.
- Martyn Price, Apprenticeship Ambassador and lately Managing Director, CMC Ltd. For services to Skills.
- Roger Simon Proctor, Founder and Managing Director, Proctor and Stevenson. For services to the Design Industry in the South West.
- Rosanne, Mrs. Pudden, Director and Group Trainer, Lowlands Farm Riding for the Disabled Group. For services to the Riding for the Disabled Association.
- Christine Ann, Mrs. Pugh, Foster Carer, Cheshire and Founder, Another Chance to Care. For services to Children and Families.
- Colin Pugh, lately Team Manager, Leaving Care Team, Rhondda Cynon Taff. For services to Young People and their Families.
- Frank William Kenneth Purssey, Volunteer, Surrey Police. For services to Policing and the community.
- Henry Joseph Quinn, Coach, East Down Athletics Club. For services to Sport and to the community in Northern Ireland.
- Trevor Quinn, Senior Warden, Ardnabannon Outdoor Education Centre. For services to Young People in Northern Ireland.
- Mamun Ur Rashid. For services to the community in the East End of London.
- William Frederick Rawling, Chairman, The Farmer Network. For services to Agriculture and Hill Farming in Cumbria and Yorkshire and to the local community.
- Miss Amanda Jacqueline Redman, Actress and Founder, Artists' Theatre School. For services to Drama and Charity.
- Miss Kim Rees, Executive Officer, Jobcentre Plus, Department for Work and Pensions.
- David Stanley Reeve, M.V.O. For services to the community in West Norfolk.
- Miss Philomena Rego. For services to the community in the City of London.
- Andrew Peter Richardson, Grade C1, Ministry of Defence.
- David Richardson, Physics Teacher, Clifton College, Bristol. For services to Science Education in Africa.
- Malcolm Ernest Ridge, Chair, the Gower Society. For services to the community in Swansea.
- John Brendan Riney. For services to charity and to the community in the East End of London.
- Ms Kellie Rixon. For services to the Hospitality Industry.
- Joanna, Mrs. Robertson. For services to the community in Edington, Wiltshire and to Vulnerable and Disadvantaged People in the Middle East.
- Peter James James-Robinson. For voluntary service to charities and to People with Disabilities in Greater Manchester.
- Neil Roden, Area Manager, Local Compliance, Individual and Public Bodies National Minimum Wage, Sheffield, H.M. Revenue and Customs.
- John Calvert Gingles Rodgers, Chairman and Founder, Northern Ireland Children to Lapland Trust. For services to Children and to charities in Northern Ireland.
- Ronald Anthony Rowe, Head, Birtley Young People's Club. For services to Young People, Sport and the community.
- Kevin Ruane, Watch Manager, Nottinghamshire Fire and Rescue Service. For services to the Fire and Rescue Service.
- Marilyn Alice, Mrs. Russell, Chair of Governors, Stockley Academy. For services to Education.
- Miss Joan Patricia Rycroft. For services to Sport in Yorkshire.
- Janice, Mrs. Sadler, Founder, Pain Support Charity, Cornwall. For services to Pain Management.
- Richard Sagar, WorldSkills Ambassador for Electrical Installation at London 2011. For services to Skills.
- John Allan Salisbury. For services to Young People in the North West.
- June Elizabeth, Mrs. Salt. For services to the community in Broadmayne, Dorset.
- Neil Rodney Samuels, Member, Manufacturing Diversity Council, Ford Motor Company. For services to the Automotive Industry.
- Ms Mirella Santamaria, Project Manager, Routes into Languages East Midlands, Nottingham Trent University. For services to Higher Education and Language Learning.
- Dr. Marek Andrzej Stella-Sawicki. For services to the Polish community and to charity.
- Dr. Julia Kathy Schofield, Consultant Dermatologist, United Lincolnshire Hospitals NHS Trust. For services to Dermatology.
- Roy Schofield. For services to community in Caistor, Lincolnshire.
- Digby Richard Lidstone-Scott, Publisher, Pig World Magazine. For services to the Pig Industry.
- John Robert Scott. For services to the community in Englefield Green, Surrey.
- Peter Scott, Chief Executive, Dorset Chamber of Commerce and Industry. For services to International Trade and Business in Dorset.
- Virginia, Mrs. Scott, Secretary, Hewell Grange Conservation and Advisory Group. For services to Conservation and to Heritage in Worcestershire.
- Barbara Pascoe, Mrs. Seaton. For Political Service.
- Susan Fullerton, Mrs. Semple, Healthcare Co-ordinator, Belfast Health and Social Care Trust. For services to Healthcare in Northern Ireland.
- Keith Hope Shackleton, Artist and Author. For services to the Conservation of Wildlife.
- Dr. Natubhai Shah. For services to the Jain Community and Inter-Faith Relations.
- Miss Karen Anne Sharp, Primary School Teacher, Lane Green First School, Staffordshire. For services to Primary Education.
- David Sharples. For services to Young People in Toxteth, Liverpool.
- Ian Christopher Shaw, lately Chairman of Governors, Lincoln College. For services to Further Education.
- William Ian Shaw. For services to the Hairdressing Industry in Yorkshire.
- Dr. Richard James Shephard, D.L., Chamberlain and Director of Development, York Minster. For services to Music and Education.
- Vishwas Shetty. For public service.
- Dawn Janette, Mrs. Shute, Founder Member, Torbay, Newton Abbot and District Support Group for Children's Hospice, South West. For services to Children with Life-Limiting Illnesses.
- Dr. Jennifer Catherine Shute. For services to British Skiing.
- Dr. Narendra Singh. For services to the community in East Lancashire.
- Ann, Mrs. McGregor-Sistern, Chief Executive Officer, Northern Ireland Chamber of Commerce. For services to Enterprise and Small Business Development.
- Dr Kenneth Skeldon, Head of Public Engagement with Research, University of Aberdeen. For services to Science Engagement.
- Miss Diana Margaret Skilbeck, President, Boat Museum Society. For services to Heritage.
- Alan Brian Slater, Chief Executive Officer, National Association of Funeral Directors. For services to the Funeral Profession.
- Antony Charles Smart. For charitable services.
- David Peter Smith, Intelligence Officer, UK Border Force. For services to Combating Smuggling and Frontier Crime.
- Neil Christian Smith, Managing Director, Kinetic plc. For services to Business in Greater Manchester.
- Sheila Edwina, Mrs. Friend-Smith. For services to Local Government in East Cambridgeshire.
- Rana, Mrs. Soobrayen, Senior Officer Tax Specialist, Large Business Service (Oil and Gas), London, H.M. Revenue and Customs.
- Brian Anthonie Sparks. For services to Schools Basketball in Wales.
- Ms Rosamund Spearing. Founder and Director, Ebony Horse Club. For services to Young People in South London.
- Frank Stapleton, Fundraiser, The MS Therapy Centre, Bedfordshire and Northamptonshire. For services to People with MS and their Families.
- John Joseph Stapleton. For services to the communities in Partington and Davyhulme, Greater Manchester.
- Gary Raymond Steele, Chairman, Prostate Cancer Support North West. For services to Cancer Support and Awareness.
- Joanne Elizabeth, Mrs. Andrew-Steer. For voluntary service to The Royal British Legion Women's Section in Northern Ireland.
- David Randall Stevens. For services to the community in Hereford.
- Harry Stevens, Head of Resuscitation Services, Prince Charles Hospital, Merthyr Tydfil. For services to Resuscitation Training.
- Ivor Robert Stevenson, Chairperson, Armagh Old Boys Silver Band. For services to Music and to the community in Northern Ireland.
- Peter John Stevenson. For services to Local Government and International Search and Rescue.
- Pamela, Mrs. Stewart. For services to the community in Wigan.
- Deborah Mees, Mrs. Stone, Specialist Osteoporosis Nurse, Bronglais Hospital, Hywel Dda Local Health Board. For services to Patients with Osteoporosis in Ceredigion.
- Ivy Elsie, Mrs. Stone. For charitable services in Penkridge, Staffordshire.
- John Stopforth, lately Chief Executive, Liverpool Chamber of Commerce. For services to Regeneration.
- Janet, Mrs. Storar, Chair, Nottingham City Homes. For services to Community Relations, Social Housing and Diversity in Nottingham.
- Charles Edward Thomas Storer. For services to Humanitarian Aid in the Balkans.
- Councillor Ann Margaret Stribley. For services to the community in Poole, Dorset.
- Margaret Elizabeth, Mrs. Sullivan, Founder, In the Pink. For charitable services to Breast Cancer Research.
- John Simison Sutherland, Project Co-ordinator Scotland, Leonard Cheshire Disability. For services to Disabled People.
- Dr. Carol Swanson, lately Service Manager, West of Scotland Archaeology Service. For services to Archaeology in Scotland.
- Ashley Charles Sweetland, Vice-Chairman, National Council for Voluntary Youth Services and lately Trustee, United Kingdom Youth Parliament. For services to Young People.
- Manju, Mrs. Tank, Maths Teacher, Taunton's College, Southampton. For services to Education.
- Adrian Taylor. For services to the Fire Service and the Young Firefighters' Association.
- Miss Fiona Elizabeth Taylor, Ward Sister, Edinburgh Cancer Centre, Western General Hospital, Edinburgh. For services to Cancer Nursing and Care in the Lothians.
- David Leon Teacher. For services to ex-service organisations and to charity in Greater Manchester.
- Ms Katherine Tearle, lately Head of Education, Glyndebourne. For services to Music.
- Gavin Thomas. For services to Post-16 Education and Training in Wales.
- Wayne Kendal Thomas, President, Rhondda Boys' and Girls' Clubs. For services to Young People in Rhondda Cynon Taff.
- Katrina Beatriz, Mrs. Thompson, Assistant Chaplain, H.M. Prison The Verne. For services to Offenders.
- Richard George Thorne. For services to Search and Rescue work on Dartmoor, Devon.
- Councillor Jefferson Houseman Tildesley. For services to Local Government and to the community in Bridgend.
- Ernest Tomlinson. For services to Music.
- Ms Margaret Tookey. For services to Humanitarian Aid through Edinburgh Direct Aid.
- Mala, Mrs. Tribich, Education Volunteer, Holocaust Education Trust and the Imperial War Museum. For services to Education.
- Glynden Trollope, Deputy Chairman, Dacorum Mental Health Support Group, Hertfordshire. For services to Mental Health.
- Sara, Mrs. Truman. For voluntary service to the National Autistic Society in Surrey.
- Miss Fiona Clare Belinda Turner, Chief Executive Officer, Stubbing Court Training. For services to Training in the Equine Industry.
- Mary Elizabeth, Mrs. Turner. For services to the community in Tiverton, Devon.
- Michael Saunders Turner. For services to the community in Great Brickhill, Buckinghamshire.
- George Thomas Rhind-Tutt. For services to People with Learning Disabilities through the Sunnybank Trust in Epsom, Surrey.
- Dr. Roger Barry Twigg, Youth and Education Officer, National Drugs Prevention Alliance. For services to Young People.
- Hugh Jolyon Twiss. For services to the Royal Navy and Royal Marines Charity and for voluntary service.
- Cathrine Helen, Mrs. Valentine, Disability Policy Holder, Reasonable Adjustment Team Leader, People Function, Nottingham, H.M. Revenue and Customs.
- Dr. Yogesh Virmani, J.P. For services to Community Relations in Greater Manchester.
- Paul Walker, Managing Director, Malvern Instruments. For services to International Trade and Local Business Support.
- Miss Maureen Wallace, Chief Executive Officer, Norris Green Credit Union. For services to the community.
- Pauline, Mrs. Ward. For services to the community in Purton, Wiltshire.
- Ms Jane Mary Warwick, Volunteer, Metropolitan Police Service. For services to Policing.
- Karen, Mrs. Watkins, Police Staff, Cheshire Constabulary. For services to Policing.
- Frederick Tyson Wayles. For services to the community in Kirkby-in-Furness, Cumbria.
- Audrey, Mrs. Wearing, Foster Carer, Darwen, Lancashire. For services to Children and Families.
- Frederick Wearing, Foster Carer, Darwen, Lancashire. For services to Children and Families.
- Miss Diane Helen Webb, Administrative Assistant, Local Compliance, Small and Medium Enterprises, Bolton, H.M. Revenue and Customs.
- Trevor Weeks, Founder, East Sussex Wildlife Rescue. For services to Animal Welfare.
- Richard John West. For services to Philately.
- Doreen, Mrs. White, Social Area Supervisor, Franklin Sixth Form College, Grimsby. For services to Education.
- Lorna, Mrs. White. For services to the community in Redditch, Worcestershire.
- Margaret, Mrs. White. For services to the community in Newcastle upon Tyne.
- Robert Charles Widdecombe. For services to Crime Prevention and Sport in Plymouth, Devon.
- Joanna Mary, Mrs. Wiesner. For services to Music and to the Arts in Bath.
- Diana, Mrs. Monier-Williams. For charitable services in Ashbourne, Derbyshire.
- Ms Katherine Elizabeth Williams. For services to the University of Leicester.
- Shane Mark Williams. For services to Rugby.
- Miss Alison Jane Williamson. For services to Archery.
- Joan, Mrs. Wilson. For charitable services in Cardiff.
- Brian Martin Winterflood. For services to Financial Services.
- John Wood, Special Constable, Avon and Somerset Constabulary. For services to Policing.
- John Rollo Wood, Chairman, Formula Student. For services to Mechanical Engineering.
- Shirley, Mrs. Bailey-Wood, Director of Publishing, British Standards Institution. For services to the Knowledge Economy.
- Harry Woodhead. For services to the community in Thirsk, North Yorkshire.
- Simon Woodvine, Founder, Fylde Coast Men's Support Association. For services to Male Victims of Rape and Sexual Abuse.
- Kenneth Douglas Emerson Woolcott. For services to the Fitness Industry.
- Louie Margaret, Mrs. Wooldridge, Governor, All Saints Infant School, Reading, Berkshire. For services to Education.
- Ms Sarah Wren. For services to the community sector in Hertfordshire.
- Adrian Mark Wright, Liaison Officer, Serious Organised Crime Agency. For services to Law Enforcement in Afghanistan.
- Councillor Ena Mary Wynne. For services to Local Government and the community in Conwy.
- Councillor Waseem Zaffar, J.P. For services to the voluntary sector in Birmingham.

==== British Empire Medal (BEM) ====
- Mrs Michelle Akintoye, For service to the Youth and Community Sectors in West London.
- Mrs Jan Elisabeth Alexander, For service to Public Health Training.
- Mrs Myrtle Cecilia Moore Allen, For voluntary service to the community and charitable service to Action Cancer.
- John Henry Allison, For voluntary service to the Royal Air Forces Association.
- Mrs Sylvia Mary Andrews, For service the community in Leicester.
- Mrs Joyce Ashley, For service the community in Glossop, Derbyshire.
- George William Atkinson, For voluntary service to the Army Cadet Force in Durham.
- Kenneth Frederick James Averill, For service to the community in East Grinstead, West Sussex.
- Mrs Ann Bagnall, Co-founder, the Food Cupboard. For service to the community in Bletchley, Buckinghamshire.
- Malcolm Bagnall, Co-founder, the Food Cupboard. For service the community in Bletchley, Buckinghamshire.
- Mrs Elaine Alison Banks, Manager, Ferries Families Groups, The Wirral. For service to Families.
- Mrs Ethne Alison Bannister, For service to the community in Coniston Cold, North Yorkshire.
- Robert Barclay, For service to Young People and Sport in Fylde and Lytham St Annes, Lancashire.
- Mrs Gillian Valerie Barnard, For service the community in Salford, Oxfordshire.
- Philip Barnett, Director, Kidz R Us, St. Ives.
- Mark Barr, For service to the Portobello Road and Golborne Road Markets, London.
- Mrs Shirley Barrett, For service to Women, Young People and Children in the Gypsy and Traveller community.
- John Walwyn Baylis, Formerly chm, Navigation Committee, Inland Waterways Association. For service Inland Waterways.
- Mrs Sylvia Rose Hartnell-Beavis, Formerly Volunteer, Ridley Specialist Day Service, Somerset Partnership NHS Foundation Trust, South West. For services to Healthcare.
- Mrs Margaret Smith Bendell, For voluntary service to Community Relations.
- Mrs Mary Beresford, For service to the community in Hawkesbury Upton, South Gloucestershire.
- Thomas Vigus Beswarick, For service to the community in Crosby.
- Richard Charles Beynon, For charitable service in Liphook, Hampshire.
- Mrs Nita Helen Bharier, For service to the Jewish community in Enfield, Barnet and Haringey, North London.
- Mrs Christine Hazel Bird, For service the community in Brome and Eye, Suffolk.
- Robin Victor Blair, For service to the community in Darlington, Durham.
- John Albert Blundell, Group Scout Leader, 15th St Pancras Group and chm, Younger Generation Theatre Group, London. For service to Young People.
- Peter Boast, For service the community in Chertsey, Surrey.
- Samuel Ronald Martin Bothwell JP. For service to Music and the community in Northern Ireland.
- Kenneth Hector John Bovey, For charitable service through the Salvation Army.
- Mrs Edith Eleanor Boyd, For service to the Girl Guide Movement in Northern Ireland.
- Mrs Janet Mary Bradbourn, For service the community in Tumble, Carmarthenshire.
- Mrs Elizabeth Brown, For service to the community in Ayton, Scottish Borders.
- Mrs Alice Burke, For services to Housing in Hackney.
- Mrs Diana May Campbell, For service the community in Orpington.
- Mrs Elayne Carr, Senior Executive Officer, Department for Environment, Food and Rural Affairs. For voluntary service to the Youth Offending Team.
- Norman Frank Carr, For service the community in Waddesdon, Buckinghamshire.
- Thomas Carson, For services to charity in Edinburgh.
- Mrs Patricia Carter, Waitress. For services to the Hospitality Industry.
- Michael Chalk, For services to Havant Rugby Football Club.
- Roger John Cheshire, For service to the community in Staffordshire.
- Miss Myra Eileen Clare, Chair, Volunteer and Committee Member, Parkinson's UK, Winchester. For service to charity.
- Mrs Christine Clarke, Accounts Payable Clerk, Finance Department, Companies House.
- Mrs Betty Christine Clayton, For service to the community in Chingford, East London.
- Mrs Joy Frances Clee, For service to the community in Kempsey, Worcestershire.
- Anthony John Cleland, For service the community in Lambeth, South London.
- Mrs Heather May Kerr Clemence, Fundraiser, Sevenoaks Branch, British Heart Foundation. For charitable service.
- David John Cobb, For service to the community in Sandhurst, Gloucestershire.
- Mrs Jillian Coe, For service to the community in Chilthorne Dormer, Somerset.
- Brendan Cojeen, For services to Combating Homelessness in Stockport.
- Michael Francis Coleman, For services to Sport and to the community in Hambledon, Surrey.
- Dennis Willis Collins, Fundraiser, Gloucestershire. For services to charity.
- John Cootes, For service to the community in Salford.
- Ronald Charles Crabb, For service the community in the City of Exeter.
- Harold Crank, For services Sport and to Charity in Warrington, Cheshire.
- Philip Anthony Venner Crawford, For services to Farming and to the Rural Community in the South West.
- Frank Cripps, Volunteer, Leonard Cheshire Disability, Hydon Hill, Surrey.
- Mrs Cynthia Crossley, Estates Operations Team Leader, Riverside College, Widnes and Runcorn. For services to Further Education.
- Alexander Angus Cumming, For voluntary service to the community in Nairn.
- Frederick John Curtis, For service to the community in Bugbrooke, Northamptonshire.
- Mrs Marian Joan Daniel, For service to the community in Whimple, Devon.
- Ms Gillian Mary David, For services the Arts in Wigan.
- Councillor Christopher Davies, For services to the Scout Association, the Bristol Port Police and the community in Bristol.
- Geoffrey Charles Davies, For services to Veterinary Education.
- Miss Sally Davis, For service to the community in Farmborough, Somerset.
- Mrs Sheena McKenzie Davis, For service to the community in Derrington, Stafford.
- William John Davis, For services to Young People in Northern Ireland.
- John Herbert Holmes Dawson, For service to the community in Lytham St. Annes, Lancashire.
- Rundle Colin Dean, For service to the community in Brotherton, North Yorkshire.
- Mrs Carole Allinson Dennis, For service to the communities in Brightwell-Cum-Sotwell and Wallingford, Oxfordshire.
- Wilfred Dillon, For services to Elderly People in Westhoughton, Lancashire.
- Ian Acford Dingle, For service to the community in Plymouth and Tavistock, Devon.
- Jack Wignall Dobson, For service the community in Wrea Green, Lancashire.
- Eric Stuart Dockerill, For voluntary service to St. John Ambulance in Suffolk.
- Mrs Patricia Downes, For service to the community in Burghill and Tillington, Herefordshire.
- Terence Downes, For services to Boxing and Charity.
- Mrs Margaret Duddridge, Volunteer, Brightwell Gostrey Centre, Farnham, Surrey. For services to Older People.
- Hugo Nicholas Canning Dunkley, For service to the community in Gringley-on-the-Hill, Nottinghamshire.
- John Bryan Dunlop, For voluntary service to the community in County Tyrone.
- Roy Eric Duxbury, Senior Officer, HM Prison Everthorpe. For services to and support of Vulnerable Prisoners.
- Paul William Edmondson, For services to the community in Kendal, Cumbria.
- James David Elliott, For services to Swimming and to the community in Northern Ireland.
- Barry Elmore, For services School Sport in Derbyshire.
- Mrs Eiddwen Evans, For charitable services to The Teenage Cancer Trust.
- John Falla, For services to the Rural Economy in the Scottish Borders.
- Brian Fear, For services Sport and to the community in Aberdare, Rhondda Cynon Taff.
- Eric Philip Ferebee, For services to Community Sports in Battersea, London.
- Mrs Brenda Flanagan, Chair, Friends of St. John's Hospice and president, International Ostomy Association. For services to charity and the lcl community.
- James Fletcher, For services to the community in Belthorn, Lancashire.
- Mrs Michele France, Catering assistant, Sheffield Hallam University. For service to Higher Education and to charity.
- Philip David Froomberg, For voluntary service to SSAFA Forces Help in Merton.
- Neal Gardner, For services to Cancer charities and the Royal Mail.
- Michael Anthony Garland, For services to Cricket in East Yorkshire.
- Mrs Dee Gent, Manager, Rainbow Childcare Centre, RAF Marham. For services the Royal Air Force.
- Mrs Jennifer Gresley Gibbons, For service the community in Haxby, York.
- Miss Laura Dorothy Alma Gillespie, For service to the community in Orford, Suffolk.
- Mrs Sandra Joan Gladwyn, For service the community in Marden, Herefordshire.
- Thomas Glynn, For service to the community in Widnes, Cheshire.
- Mrs Florence Marian Goddard, Fundraiser, Arthritis Research UK. For services to People with Arthritis.
- Mrs Azalia Ruth Gosling, For voluntary service to the British Red Cross Society in Southampton.
- Brendan Patrick Gibb-Gray, For service to the community in Emsworth, Hampshire.
- Adrian Frank William Grayson, For services to Sport in Bedale, North Yorkshire.
- Norman Edward Grey, Volunteer, Young Explorers' Trust, Mansfield, Nottinghamshire. For services to Young People.
- Neil Norman Gurney, For service to the community and to charity in Wingrave, Buckinghamshire.
- Arthur William Gutteridge, For voluntary service to the Royal Naval Association.
- Mrs Joyce Ethel Hall, Volunteer, National Trust. For services to Heritage.
- Richard Wilson Hall, For service to the community in Leominster, Herefordshire.
- Richard James Halsall, Head of Operations, Arriva Manchester. For services to Fundraising for the MS Trust.
- Mrs Anna Marie Hamilton, Personal secretary to the Human Resource dir, Queen's University Belfast. For services to Higher Education in Northern Ireland.
- Colin Handforth, For services to Amateur Rugby League.
- Mrs Penelope Ann Hannigan, Teaching assistant, Crowmarsh Gifford Church of England Primary School, Oxfordshire. For services to Education.
- Mrs Susan Jacqueline Harper, For services to Visually Impaired People in Watford, Hertfordshire.
- Herbert Harris, Honorary president, 1st Redditch Boys' Brigade, Worcestershire. For services to Young People.
- Roland John Harrup, For service to the community in Stoke Hammond, Buckinghamshire.
- Ernest Lesley Havis, For services to the community and to Charity in Cheshunt, Hertfordshire.
- Mrs Shirley Hawkins, Executive assistant, Epping Forest District Council. For services the residents of the Epping Forest District and Charity.
- Gary Bryan Haynes, For services to Disability Sports.
- George Anthony Heath, For services the community in Ringmer, East Sussex.
- George Ernest Hedges, Secretary and chm, Respite Nursing for Oxfordshire's Sick Youngsters. For services Sick Children.
- Mrs Elizabeth Henry, Founder and Chair, Ballymena Area Schools Romania Group. For services to the community in Northern Ireland.
- Mrs Elaine Herd, Nursing Auxiliary, Northern Ireland Hospice. For services Nursing.
- Mrs Doreen Herridge, For service to the community in Rixton, Cheshire.
- Raymond Hewett, For services to Roke and Benson Brass Band.
- Mrs Rosemary Hickson, For service to the community in Merton, South West London.
- Mrs Denise Elizabeth Hillier, The Duke of Edinburgh's Award Co-ordinator, Rainford High Technology College, St. Helens. For services to Young People.
- John Ralph Hinchcliffe, For service to the community in Barnard Castle, Durham.
- Philip Osborne Hitchens, For service to the community in Penzance, Cornwall.
- Eric Thomas Holdaway, For service to the community in Hutton, Weston-Super-Mare, Somerset.
- Dr Nicholas Robert Joseph Hooper DL RD JP For services to the community in Bristol and North Somerset.
- Geoffrey Hopkinson, For services to Beekeeping and Environmental Education.
- Mrs Mavis Hopkinson, For service to the community in Bolton.
- Alan Leslie Hornby, For service to the community in Kirk Hammerton, North Yorkshire.
- David William Howard, For services to the Samaritans in Lincoln.
- Peter Edward Hughes, For services to Rugby Union Football in Lancashire.
- Mrs Margaret Hunter, For services to Football and to Bowling.
- Mrs Jean Brenda Hutton, For services to the community in St. Albans, Hertfordshire.
- Mrs Carol Eva Jacobs, PA to Dean of Students, University of East Anglia. For services to Higher Education.
- Mrs Agnes Johnston, For voluntary service to SSAFA Forces Help in Perth and Kinross.
- John Lloyd-Jones, Prison Officer, HM Prison Stocken, Rutland.
- Mrs Valerie Margaret Jurgens, For services to the community in Petts Wood.
- Miss Rebecca Elizabeth Jury, Administrative assistant, Corporate Affairs Directorate Co-ordination Unit, Driver and Vehicle Licensing Agency. For services to charity.
- Satish Chimanlal Kakkad, Retail Travel Adviser, London Midland, Milton Keynes Central Station. For service to the Rail Industry.
- David Chapman Keast, For services to the Davidstow Moor RAF Memorial Museum, Cornwall.
- Mrs Irene Erica Kelly, Volunteer, Nottinghamshire. For services to Bereavement Care.
- Miss Irene Kerr, Messenger, Health and Safety Executive, Department of Enterprise, Trade and Investment, Northern Ireland Executive.
- Colin Kibblewhite, For service to the community in Oakham, Rutland.
- Mrs Margaret Kiddie, Services Support Officer, Thorntree Primary School, Glasgow. For services to Education.
- Miss Brenda Killick, For service to the community in Reigate, Surrey.
- Edward Anthony Kilpin, For service the community in Hackleton, Northamptonshire.
- Philip Nelson King, For service to the community in Southport, Merseyside.
- John Frederick Knight, For service to the community in Thaxted, Essex.
- Mrs Susan Elaine Ladd, Station Administrative Officer, Vehicle and Operator Services Agency.
- Ronald Lambert, For voluntary service to the community in Holywell, Flintshire.
- Michael Ansdell Langman, For service to the community in Braunstone, Leicestershire.
- Councillor Maureen Larkin, JP, For service to the community in Basildon, Essex.
- Anthony George Lees, For service to the community in Seaford and East Sussex.
- Mrs Patricia Rosemary Leviston, For service to the community in Cliffe, Kent.
- Paul Lewis, For services to the Royal Mail, Engineering and the community in South Glamorgan.
- Victor Iorwerth Lewis, For voluntary service to the Royal British Legion in Ceredigion.
- Thomas Antony Liddle, For service to the community in Milnthorpe, Cumbria.
- Mrs Audrey Lloyd, For service to the community in Whale Hill, Redcar.
- Mrs Enyd Marion Lock, For services to Young People in Nantymoel, Bridgend.
- Yann Rufus Lovelock, For services to Community Cohesion and to Inter-Faith Relations in the West Midlands.
- William James Lunn, Caretaker, Park School Belfast. For services to Education in Northern Ireland.
- Mrs Jamesina Miller MacKay, For services to Highland Dancing and Charity in Caithness.
- Mrs Verna MacNaughton, For service to the community in Tyneside.
- Mrs Gloria Maria Maden, Head Coach, Civil Service Netball Club. For services to Netball and to Young People in Suffolk.
- Anthony Gerrard Mallam, For service to the community in Wednesbury, West Midlands.
- Mrs Susan Malley, For services to the Land Registry and to the StrongerTogether Project, Peterborough.
- David James Margarson, Higher Executive Officer, Jobcentre Plus. For services to Mental Health in Lincolnshire.
- Mrs Jean Lesley Marsden, Admissions and Reception Services mgr, John Ruskin College, Croydon. For services Education.
- Mrs Patricia Anne Marval, For services to the community in Bristol.
- Harold Mason, For service the community in Rawcliffe, East Yorkshire.
- Dr John Robert Mather, For services to Ornithology and Conservation.
- Mrs Shirley Matthews, Sheltered Scheme Officer, Tanybryn Sheltered Housing Complex, Burry Port. For services to Elderly People and the community in Carmarthenshire.
- Martin Alston Maybrey, For service to the community in Wonersh, Surrey.
- Mrs Carolyn McCabe, Chair, Portadown Festival Association. For services to the Performing Arts in Northern Ireland.
- Mrs Joan Mary McConn JP For services to the community in Kingston-upon-Thames.
- Mrs Carol Ann McGee, For services to the community in Bilsdale, North Yorkshire.
- Mrs Marilynn Carole McGee, Caretaker, Prior Pursglove College, Guisborough, North Yorkshire. For services to Sixth Form Education.
- Samuel Nelson McGonagle, For voluntary and charitable service to the community in Northern Ireland.
- Paul McKee, For services Amateur Sport, Basketball and the community.
- Mrs Margaret McKeegan, For charitable service in Chester.
- Philip Jude McKeown, Technical Instructor, Braid Valley Hospital, Ballymena. For services to Healthcare in Northern Ireland.
- Narendra Mehta, Records Officer, Ministry of Justice.
- Richard Michael, For services to Music Education.
- Mrs Elizabeth Millar, Chair, Ballymena Combat Cancer Group. For services to Cancer Research and People with Cancer.
- Peter Howard Mills, For services to the Alresford and District Agricultural Society's Annual Show and the lcl community.
- Brian Milner, For services to the Royal Mail and to Disabled People.
- Mrs Sybil Moores, Retired Nurse and Fundraiser, St Peter's Hospice, Gloucestershire. For services to the NHS and charity.
- Nicholas Royston Morgan, For charitable service.
- John Sampson Morton, For service to the community in Grindleford, Derbyshire.
- Mrs Mary Elizabeth Anne Moss, Fundraiser, Hampshire. For service to People with Hearing Impairments.
- Mrs Agatha Joan Mossman, For service to the community in Bristol.
- Miss Corinne Joy Murphy, For charitable services through the Karibuni Trust in Kenya.
- Mrs Manju Nagji, Volunteer, Roe Green School, London. For services to Education.
- Colin John Nicholson, For service to Music in Colchester.
- Mrs Gillian Nobbs, Coach, Wetherby Gymnastics Club. For service to Gymnastics.
- Mrs Frances O'Dwyer, Formerly Support Worker, Bolsover Community Mental Health Team, Derbyshire. For services to Mental Health.
- Raymond Oxley, For service to the community in Derby.
- Owen Parfitt, President, Blackwood Rugby Club. For services Rugby Football and to the community in Blackwood, Caerphilly.
- Mrs Isobel Parke, Caretaker, Glynn Primary School. For service to Education in Northern Ireland.
- Sufyaan Mustak Patel, For services the community sector in Blackburn, Lancashire.
- Ms Rebecca Pickles, For services to Young People in South Yorkshire.
- Nicholas Pitts, For service to the community in Spalding, Lincolnshire.
- Richard Plume, For service to the community in Northwood, North West London.
- Colin Leslie Plummer, For service to the community in Sarratt, Hertfordshire.
- Mrs Mary Pointon, For service to the community in Hopwas, Staffordshire.
- William David Pollock, For services to Young People through the Scout Association.
- Mrs Pamela Mary Chessington Potts, For service to the community in Whittlesey, Cambridgeshire.
- Dr Peter Pritchard, For service to the community in Dorchester-on-Thames, Oxfordshire.
- Mrs Jennifer Shirley Private, For service to Visually Impaired People in Bexhill-on-Sea, East Sussex.
- Michael Pullin, For voluntary service to St. Michael's Hospice, Herefordshire.
- Robert John Pumfrey, For services to the Heritage of Steam and Agricultural Machinery in East Anglia.
- Miss Alice Olivia Pyne, Fundraiser, Cumbria. For services to charity.
- Miss Milly Kate Pyne, Fundraiser, Cumbria. For services to charity.
- Gerald William Chin-Quee, For service to the community in Falmouth, Cornwall.
- Douglas Atkinson Raine, For service to the community in Sandsend, North Yorkshire.
- Mrs Bertha Ann Rankin, Youth Worker, Belfast Education and Library Board. For services to Young People in Northern Ireland.
- Mrs Meryl Gloria Rawlings, Administrative Officer, Essex Magistrates' Courts Committee, Ministry of Justice.
- Miss Jean Rea, For services to the community in Northern Ireland.
- Paul Anthony Rees, Executive Officer, Estates and Corporate Services, Driver and Vehicle Licensing Agency.
- Mrs Irene Rebecca Audrey Robb, Activity Co-ordinator, Waterside Hospital, Northern Ireland. For services to Healthcare.
- Mrs Elizabeth Roberts, For services to Music and to the community in Anglesey.
- Ms Margaret Robertson, Porter, Ninewells Hospital, Dundee. For services to Cancer Patients.
- Clarence Bennie Robinson, For service to the community in East Staffordshire.
- Mark James Rodman, For service to the community in Newmarket, Suffolk.
- Mrs Eileen Mary Rooke, Chair, Honiton Hospiscare Fund Raising Support, Devon. For services to charity.
- Mrs Elizabeth Rose, Home Care Worker, Belfast Health and Social Care Trust. For services to the community in Northern Ireland.
- James Ross, For services to Amateur Football in Argyll and Bute.
- Barry Thomas Ryan, Formerly Caretaker, Walford and North Shropshire College. For services to Further Education.
- Mrs Rosemary May Sandall, For charitable service in Chernobyl, Ukraine and service to Carers.
- Ms Janet Elizabeth Sawyer, Managing dir, LittlePod. For services to Employment and Culture in East Devon.
- Joseph David Schleider, For service to the Jewish community in North West London.
- Robert Selby, Founder and president, Newton-le-Willows Boys' and Girls' Club, St. Helens, Merseyside. For services to Young People.
- Mrs Joy Winifred Seward, For service to the community through Sidmouth in Bloom, Devon.
- Peter Arthur Sexton, Assistant Group Scout Leader, 2nd Bramhall Scout Troop, Cheshire. For services to Young People.
- Raymond Mark Shaddick, For services the community and to charity in Bude, Cornwall.
- Sobhag Narshi Shah, Head Caretaker, Richmond upon Thames College, Twickenham. For services to Further Education.
- Mrs Patricia Ann Shannon, Senior Sister, Ulster Hospital Belfast. For services to Nursing and to the Community in Northern Ireland.
- Ms Margaret Jacqueline Shapland, For services to Conservation and to Heritage in Clifton, Bristol.
- Mrs Alison Louise Shelton, Centre mgr, The LV Streetwise Safety Centre. For services Policing and the community.
- Robert Shepherd, For voluntary service to Hospital Radio in Angus.
- Robert Sheppard, For service to Nature Conservation.
- John Shepperson, For service to the community in Swavesey, Cambridgeshire.
- Lionel David Skelhorne, Volunteer, Officer of the Bursar, University of Bristol. For services to Heritage Buildings and Higher Education.
- Mrs Kaylet Anita Smedley, Chairman, Derbyshire Branch of the Leukaemia Research Fund. For services to Leukaemia and Lymphoma Research.
- Anthony James Smith, For service the community in Paignton, Devon.
- David Smith, For service to the community in Manchester.
- David Lawrence Smith, Founder and lately chm, The Wash House Youth Club, Lewisham, London. For services to Young People.
- Francis Graham Smith, For services to Victim Support and to Health in Preston, Lancashire.
- Jack Smith, For services to Education and the community in Loanhead.
- John Francis Howe Smith, Secretary, The Stamford Mercury Archive Trust. For services to Conservation.
- Richard Frederick Smith, For service to the community in Beaconsfield, Buckinghamshire.
- David Spurrell, Formerly dir, Sovereign Youth Centre, Surrey. For services to Young People.
- Dr Roger William Squires, Formerly Deputy National chm, Inland Waterways Association. For service to Inland Waterways.
- Peter Christian Steiner, For service to the community in Merton, South West London.
- George Alan Sutton, Youth Officer, Birkenhead and South Wirral Youth Service and Founder, Oread Mountaineering Club. For service to Young People.
- Mrs Vivienne Tamar Margaret Target, For service to the community in Low Worsall, North Yorkshire.
- Mrs Agnes Cynthia Mary Taylor, For service to the community in Rustington, West Sussex.
- John Edward Teague, Member, St. Vincent de Paul Society. For services to the community.
- Mrs Nora Ann Hope Tennant, Chair, Friends of Davenies School and Cub Scout Leader, 2nd Beaconsfield Scout Group, Beaconsfield, Buckinghamshire. For service to the community.
- Dr Myrtle Sylvia Ternstrom, For services to the Lundy Field Society.
- Mrs Janet Ann Tibbey, Playgroup Leader, Clarendon Park Playgroup, Christchurch, Leicester. For services to Children and Families.
- Mrs Joyce Tickner, Volunteer, Danbury Park School, Danbury, Essex. For services to Education.
- Leslie Denis Togwell, Group chm, 15th St. Pancras Scout Group, London. For services to Young People.
- Michael Plaistow Trapaud, For service to the community in Shalden, Hampshire.
- Leonard Trevillion, For services to Music in Mayfield, East Sussex.
- Christopher David Trigwell, For service to the community in Kintbury, Berkshire.
- Mrs Patricia Mary Tucker, For service to the community in Berrynarbor, North Devon.
- David Turner, For service to the community in Hitcham, Suffolk.
- Miss Anne Skelton Vance, For services to People with Mental Illness in Northern Ireland.
- Derrick Francis Vernall, For service to the community in Horning, Norfolk.
- Mrs Janice Waterman, Scout Leader and School Volunteer, King's Somborne, Hampshire. For services to Young People.
- Alan George Watts, Captain, 5th London Company, Boys' Brigade. For services to Young People.
- Mrs Edna Weatherby, Fundraiser, Royal National Lifeboat Institution. For services to Maritime Safety.
- Mrs Patricia May Wenbourne, For service to the community in High Halden, Kent.
- Mrs Mary Glenys Wheeler, For service to the community in Garston, Liverpool.
- Mrs Dorothy Ella White, For service to the community in Newrough and Fourstones, Northumberland.
- Leslie Whitfield, Regional Volunteer Co-ordinator, Royal Society of Chemistry Benevolent Fund. For services to Chemistry and to the Community.
- Mrs Yvonne Doris Whitley, Volunteer, Plas Newydd, Anglesey. For service to the National Trust and for charitable service in Anglesey.
- Anthony Willis, For service to the community in Sutton Coldfield, West Midlands.
- Peter Richard Willmer, For service to the community in Great Staughton, Cambridgeshire.
- Mrs Geraldine Mary Wilson, For service to the community in Loughton, Essex.
- Mrs Margaret Wilson, For services to Young People through the Girls' Brigade and The Duke of Edinburgh's Award Scheme.
- Nigel Vincent Winchester, For service to the community in Maghull, Liverpool.
- Ms Beryl Windsor, For service to the Angel Canal Festival in North London.
- Mrs Rita Winstanley, Manager G, HM Young Offenders Institution Styal. For services to Female Offenders.
- Mrs Isabella Woods, For services to Cycling in Northern Ireland.
- Inigo Rodney Milman Woolf, For service to the community in Hampstead, North West London.
- Mrs Constance Wright, Governor and Volunteer Patient Representative, Royal National Hospital for Rheumatic Diseases NHS Foundation Trust. For voluntary services to Healthcare.
- Robert Dawson Wright, Museum Attendant, Northern Ireland War Memorial. For services to Museums.
- Colin John Yates, Captain, St. Catherine's Company, The Church Lads' and Church Girls' Brigade, Altrincham. For services to the community.
- Geoffrey John Young, Teacher and The Duke of Edinburgh's Award Scheme Leader, Mellow Lane School, Hayes, West London. For services to Young People.

== Australia ==
The Queen's Birthday Honours 2012 for Australia were announced on 11 June 2012.

== New Zealand ==
The 2012 Queen's Birthday and Diamond Jubilee Honours were published on 4 June 2012 by Department of the Prime Minister and the Cabinet before being published in the New Zealand Gazette.

== Antigua and Barbuda ==
=== Order of the British Empire ===
==== Member of the Order of the British Empire (MBE) ====
- Jason D. Brodie. For public service

== Barbados ==
=== Knight Bachelor ===
- The Reverend Wesley Winfield Hall. For services to sport and the community

=== The Order of the British Empire ===
==== Commander of The Order of the British Empire (CBE) ====
- Rashid Orlando Marville. For his contribution to the Foreign Service.
- The Reverend Oscar Holman Millar. For services to the Methodist Church, education and the community.
- Dr. George Lincoln Reid. For services to the financial sector.

==== Officer of The Order of the British Empire (OBE) ====
- Dr. Frances Louise Chandler. For services to agriculture.
- Hensley Henderson Robinson. For public service in the area of the electoral process.
- Ms Carolyn Adora Sinkler. For services to education and sport

==== Member of The Order of the British Empire (MBE) ====
- Collis Earl Blackman. For services to labour relations.
- David Lionel Harding. For services to the maritime industry

== Grenada ==
=== Order of The British Empire ===
==== Member of The Order of the British Empire (MBE) ====
- Ms Anne Louise Pierre. For services to education.

=== British Empire Medal (BEM) ===
- Glenroy Albert Johnson. For public service and services to sport.
- Sister Mary Francis Nelson. For social work

== Belize ==
=== Order of the British Empire ===
==== Officer of The Order of the British Empire (OBE) ====
- Sister Maria Caritas Lawrence. For services to education and religion.
- The Right Reverend Philip Silvin Wright. For services to religion.

== St Lucia ==
=== Order of Saint Michael and Saint George ===
==== Companion of The Order of Saint Michael and Saint George (CMG) ====
- Calixte George. For services to the nation in agriculture and government

=== Order of The British Empire ===
==== Officer of The Order of the British Empire (OBE) ====
- Virginia, Mrs. Albert-Poyotte. For services to teaching, educational administration and the community.
- Anthony Bryan Severin. For his contribution to public and regional service.

==== Member of The Order of the British Empire (MBE) ====
- Ms Juliet Clare Brathwaite. For services to education and charity.
- Ignatius Evans. For services to education and the community.
- MacDonald Jawahir. For services to agriculture and business.
- Keifer Vitalis. For services to industry and commerce

=== British Empire Medal (BEM) ===
- Margaret, Mrs. Murris-Anthony. For services to the community.
- Ms Melzar Bruce. For services to education, community and youth development.
- Gregory Dickson. For services to the community.
- Antonia Leonilla, Mrs. Polius. For services to teaching and the community.
- Leonard Preville. For services to agriculture and the community

== Solomon Islands ==
=== Order of Saint Michael and Saint George ===
==== Knight Commander of The Order of Saint Michael and Saint George (KCMG) ====
- Francis Billy Hilly CMG. For services to politics, governance, public administration and community development.

=== Order of the British Empire ===
==== Knight Commander of The Order of the British Empire (KBE) ====
- Bruce Joshua Saunders OBE. For service to business and public and community development.

==== Officer of The Order of the British Empire (OBE) ====
- Chief Colin Gauwane. For services to politics, education, the Church and community development.
- Kamilo Teke. For services to governance, local politics, education and the Church.

==== Member of The Order of the British Empire (MBE) ====
- Fr. Sam Ata. For services to the Church and the community
- Bartholomew Basia. For services to the media, sport and the community.
- Simon Joshua Houma. For services to education, the Church and community development.
- The Reverend Canon Mathew Kale. For services to education, the Church, provincial government and community development.
- Ms Caroline Laore. For services to the community

== The Cook Islands ==
=== Order of the British Empire ===
==== Member of The Order of the British Empire (MBE) ====
- Daniel Apii. For services to the public and the community

=== British Empire Medal (BEM) ===
- Nooroa Kairenga Atera. For services to the public and the community.
