= Niblett =

Niblett is a surname of British origin. People with that name include:

- Callum Niblett (born 2003), British music producer
- Harry Seawell Niblett (1852–1939), Royal Navy officer
- James Niblett (Jim Niblett, born c. 1950), British civil servant
- Jason Niblett (born 1983), Australian professional racing cyclist
- Jeanette Crossley, nee Niblett (1949–2015), New Zealand biochemist
- Robin Niblett (born 1961), British specialist in international relations
- Ryan Niblett (born 2004), American football player
- Scout Niblett (Emma Louise Niblett, born 1973), English singer, songwriter and multi-instrumentalist
- Stephen Niblett (fl. 1726–1766), English academic administrator at the University of Oxford
- Vic Niblett (1924–2004), English footballer

== See also ==
- Niblett's Bluff, a former port on Sabine River, Louisiana, U.S.A.
- Fort Niblett, a later construction at Niblett's Bluff
- Neblett, a surname
