= Redeeming Our Communities =

British charitable organisation

- Founded: 2004
- Founder: Debra Green OBE
- Type: (Registered Charity Number: 1139817; Registered Charity in Scotland SC044606)
- Headquarters: Manchester, UK
- Region served: United Kingdom
- Website: http://roc.uk.com http://scotland.roc.uk.com/

Redeeming Our Communities (ROC) is a UK-based charity, founded by author and popular speaker Debra Green OBE in 2004.

ROC is a community engagement charity; people of goodwill working together towards safer, kinder communities. Their activities include partnerships with community groups, churches, police, fire service, local authorities and voluntary agencies. They currently run over 250 projects throughout the UK targeting a variety of social needs, reaching over 2000 people every week.

== History ==
The Redeeming Our Communities initiative was launched in 2004 at the Reebok Stadium in Bolton, where thousands of people across the North West gathered and pledged to reduce violent crime in the region. A year later that pledge was met when the Metro Newspaper reported that violent crime in the region had fallen by 11%, bucking the national trend.

In 2006 ROC became a national organisation, holding an event in the NEC Arena in Birmingham. The event was attended by 7,000, and as a result many people across the UK signed up to become ROC Ambassadors, spreading the vision of ROC across the UK. After the National Launch, ROC began to host conferences to train and equip people in how to set up projects using the ROC model.

Since the National Launch, ROC has moved into over 200 different regions across the UK, including the Belfast Launch event in 2012. During this time ROC have hosted several high-profile Launch Events, including the 2009 Liverpool Launch which attracted over 5,000 people and the 2010 Birmingham Launch which drew 2,000. These high-profile events are held in partnership with local police forces in the hopes of building links and creating local ROC projects.

ROC launched in Scotland at the ROC Scotland Showcase event on 5 February 2014. The event was attended by over 1700 people including 100 civic leaders and senior members of public services. The evening was hosted by Sally Magnusson and included performances from the Police Pipe Band, Midge Ure, Jai McDowall and the High School of Glasgow Chamber Choir. The evening inspired people to get involved in community projects.

In recognition of her work ROC founder Debra Green received an OBE in June 2012.

In 2018 ROC were awarded the Queen's Award for voluntary service and attended a garden party at Buckingham Palace.

ROC have developed a community engagement model called a ROC Conversation. They have delivered over 250 of these across the UK in Counties, Cities, towns, and villages. Their work has recently been recognised by the Home Office.

== ROC projects ==
There are currently over 300 projects under the ROC banner. These projects are multi-agency and will usually involve partnerships among faith groups, police, and emergency services as well as various other statutory agencies and organisations.

Projects and initiatives include:

- ROC Cafés, which provide diversionary activities for young people
- ROC Conversation community engagement initiatives
- ROC Centres, offering a community hub for a variety of projects
- ROC Care, which focuses on the elderly and isolated
- ROC Football
- Mentoring schemes
- Mobile community bus scheme

ROC claims to have seen reductions in crime as a result of their projects, including significant reductions in anti-social behaviour, which has inspired additional ROC projects.

In 2008 Debra Green wrote a book, containing the stories of many of the projects: Redeeming Our Communities: 21st Century Miracles of Social Transformation. Her next book, ROC your World; transforming communities for good, was published by River Publishing in March 2014.

In 2012 ROC announced that they would be starting a restorative justice scheme called ROC Restore.

In 2014 ROC received a new HQ as a community asset transfer, The FUSE in Trafford. The FUSE is a £5Million state of the art community centre received on a 22 year rent free lease in recognition of their work

In 2018 ROC Restore, restorative Justice project was awarded the RSQM, The Restorative Service Quality Mark Princess Ann visited ROC HQ to celebrate 5 years of their restorative justice work.

== UK wide ==
In 2014, the charity launched into Scotland, hosting a Showcase Event on 5 February. Following the event, it was reported by ROC that several projects were in the planning stages including in Parkhead, Queen's Park Glasgow, Newton Stewart and Edinburgh.
