= Neblett =

Neblett is a family name, and may refer to:

- A. Viola Neblett (1842-1897), American temperance activist, suffragist, and women's rights pioneer
- Andre Neblett (born 1988), American football player
- Colin Neblett (1875–1950), American judge
- Edward Neblett (born 1964), Barbadian boxer
- James Neblett (1901–1959), West Indian cricketer
- Touré (born 1971), born Touré Neblett, American author

== See also ==
- Niblett, a surname
