= Ashton Community Science College =

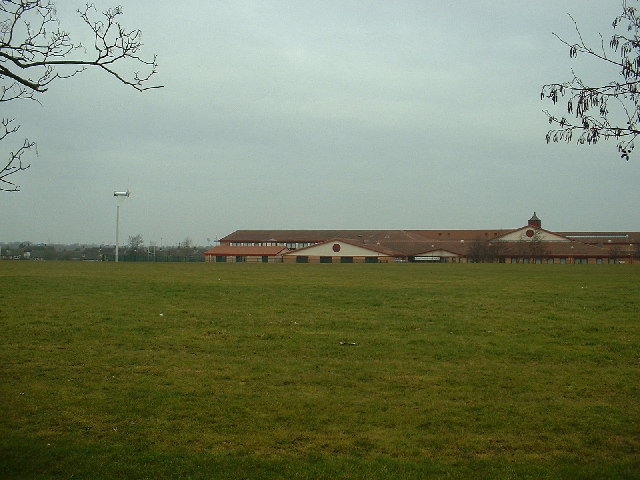
- View of the school (2005)

Location
- Aldwych Drive; Ashton-on-Ribble; Preston, Lancashire, PR2 1SL; England; 53.77043°N 2.75019°W

Information
- Type: Community school
- Local authority: Lancashire
- Department for Education URN: 119707 Tables
- Ofsted: Reports
- Headteacher: Janet Hoyle
- Gender: Coeducational
- Age: 11 to 16
- Enrolment: 831 as of December 2022
- Website: www.ashtoncsc.lancs.sch.uk

Ashton Community Science College is a coeducational secondary school located in the Ashton-on-Ribble area of Preston in the English county of Lancashire.

It is a community school administered by Lancashire County Council. The school also has a specialism in science. Feeder primary schools include Ashton Primary School and St Andrews CE Primary School in Ashton-on-Ribble, Lea Community Primary School and Lea Endowed CE Primary School in Lea, and Cottam Primary School in Cottam.

Ashton Community Science College offers GCSEs, BTECs and OCR Nationals as programmes of study for pupils. The school also offers The Duke of Edinburgh's Award programme.

The school was originally called Ashton-on-Ribble High School.
