= Tony Cunningham =

Tony or Anthony Cunningham may refer to:

- Tony Cunningham (politician), British politician
- Tony Cunningham (footballer), Jamaican footballer
- Anthony Cunningham, hurler and Gaelic football and hurling manager
- T. J. Cunningham (Anthony Cunningham Jr.), American football player
