= Debra Green =

Debra Jean Green OBE is an author, popular speaker and founder of Redeeming Our Communities, a UK-wide charity based in Manchester, UK.

== Career ==
Throughout the 1990s Green worked for Network, the Council of Churches in Greater Manchester. She was instrumental in setting up a leaders' forum and a citywide prayer event, Prayer Network, which involved over 200 churches of many denominations working and praying together for the city. She co-ordinated citywide meetings which focused on issues such as crime, education and healthcare, with up to 2500 people attending these events. Stories from this season are captured in Green's book, City-Changing Prayer, co-authored with her husband, Frank Green.

From 1997 to 2003 Green was on the National Council of the Evangelical Alliance. She was part of the co-ordinating team for More Than Gold, an initiative which brought people together for various citywide events during the Commonwealth Games in Manchester 2002.

From 2002 to 2004 Green worked for Festival:Manchester (a joint initiative of The Message Trust and the Luis Palau Organisation), a venture which launched the church into social transformation projects across Manchester. Many of the projects were done in partnership with the Greater Manchester Police. Green was responsible for coordinating collaboration among 500 churches across the North West region.

In the summer of 2008 Green hosted a high-profile community prayer event at the Velodrome National Cycling Centre in Manchester, where over 2000 Christians gathered for an evening of prayer about the issue of gang violence. The event was attended by police chiefs, community leaders and politicians.

Later in 2008 Green organised a regional event, The Game of Life, which was attended by 6000 people at the Manchester Velodrome.

In 2018 Green joined the planning group of Spring Harvest

== Charities ==
=== City Links ===
Green officially launched her first charity, City Links, in 2003 at the end of Festival: Manchester in the Apollo Manchester. The group's aim was to continue networking churches and organisations for the purpose of prayer and mission, with a focus on the North-West of England. Through City Links three projects were launched: the North West Leaders' Forum, Redeeming the Arts and Redeeming Our Communities.

=== Redeeming Our Communities ===
In 2004 Green founded the charity Redeeming Our Communities (ROC), of which she is the National Director. ROC is a national community engagement charity. This group aims to bring about community transformation by creating strategic partnerships which open up opportunities for crime and disorder reduction and improved community cohesion.

Over the following years, stories of community transformation emerged across the nation, some of which are collected together for Green's 2014 book 'ROC Your World; changing communities for good' published by River Publishing

In recognition of her work towards community cohesion, she was awarded an OBE in June 2012.

In 2012, ROC launched in Northern Ireland at the Waterfront Arena.

Green wrote a book titled ROC your World; changing communities for good, published by River Publishing in March 2014.

In 2014 ROC received a community asset transfer which became their HQ. The FUSE is a £5 million state of the art community centre in Trafford Manchester. The charity were awarded the building by the Government in recognition of their work on a 22-year rent free lease.

In 2014, ROC launched in Scotland at the Royal Concert Hall in Glasgow https://vimeo.com/88165445.

In 2018 ROC was awarded the Queen's Award for voluntary service on behalf of their 8000 volunteers. Debra attended a garden party at Buckingham Palace. She was also invited to attend the wedding of Harry and Meghan at Windsor Castle in 2018 at the invitation of the Lord Lieutenant of Greater Manchester.

In 2019 ROC were recognised by the Home Office for their community engagement work. The ROC Conversation model has been used in over 250 UK locations.

== Other leadership roles ==
For 20 years Green was on the leadership team of Ivy Manchester Church, a large church in South Manchester.

Her speaking engagements include Spring Harvest, New Wine, Festival of Praise Focusfest CLAN, as well many other conferences and community gatherings across the UK.

== Personal life ==
Debra Green is married to Frank and they have four grown up children.

== Bibliography ==
- D. Green & F. Green, "City-Changing Prayer" (Kingsway, 2005) ISBN 1-84291-218-6
- D. Green, "Redeeming Our Communities: 21st Century Miracles of Social Transformation" (New Wine Press, 2008) ISBN 978-1-905991-09-9
- D. Green, "ROC your World, transforming communities for good" (River Publishing, 2014)
- D. Green & D. Roberts "Mountain Moving Prayer. The unlimited potential (SPCK, 2019)"
