= Dougal Goodman =

British scientist

Dougal Jocelyn Goodman OBE is a British scientist, and was Chief Executive of the Foundation for Science and Technology during 2000–2018.

Goodman studied at Christ's College, Cambridge and researched the mechanical properties of ice at the Cavendish Laboratory, Cambridge under Professor David Tabor. In 1980 he worked for BP managing a research programme on the effects of ice forces on offshore structures, later becoming head of safety for the company. From 1995 to 2000 he was a Deputy Director of the British Antarctic Survey responsible for the science undertaken by the UK Antarctic Programme, and was awarded the Polar Medal. His interests are polar history and development of arctic areas as well as walking from Coulags Croft in Coulags in the highlands of Scotland.

He was appointed Officer of the Order of the British Empire (OBE) in the 2012 Birthday Honours for services to science.
