= Tina Lavender =

British midwife

Professor Dame Tina Lavender DBE (born 1965 or 1966) is a British midwife and professor of maternal and newborn health at the Liverpool School of Tropical Medicine (LSTM). She is the director of the Centre for Childbirth, Women's, and Newborn Health which is a collaboration between WHO and LSTM. She is also chief investigator at the NIHR Global Health Unit on the Prevention and Management of Stillbirths and Neonatal Deaths in Sub-Saharan Africa and South Asia.

== Early life and education ==
She attended Roby Comprehensive School and trained in nursing at Broadgreen Hospital. She has an M.Sc. and a Ph.D., her thesis title being "Managing prolonged labour using different partogram action lines: obstetric outcome and maternal satisfaction".

== Career and research ==
She has been professor of midwifery and the director of the Centre for Global Women's Health at the University of Manchester until 2020.

She was awarded DBE "for services to midwifery" in 2012 and is an Honorary Fellow of the Royal College of Midwives. In 2015, she was listed as one of BBC's 100 Women.
