= Jim Niblett =

James Niblett OBE (born c. 1950) is a British former civil servant who served as Head of International Policy at Ofcom. He studied at Trinity College, Cambridge 1971–1975. He began his career in the civil service, and in 1996 moved to Oftel. In 2003, he joined Ofcom when that organisation was created. In 2012, he was made an Officer of the Order of the British Empire for services to telecommunications.

Niblett is also a successful tournament bridge player, whose achievements include: winning the Harrison Gray Salver in 1974, winning the Tollemache Trophy in 1983, contesting the Gold Cup final in 1987, and winning the Crockford's Cup in 1989.
