= Colin Crooks =

British Ambassador to the Republic of Korea

His Excellency Colin Crooks LVO
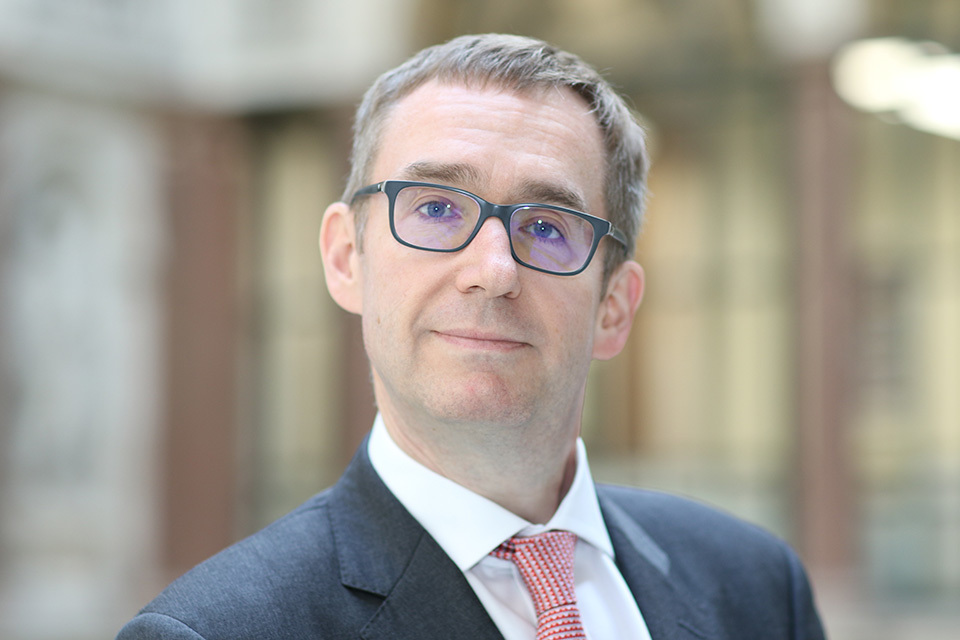
- Crooks in 2017

British Ambassador to South Korea
- Incumbent
- Assumed office March 2022
- Monarchs: Elizabeth II; Charles III
- Prime Minister: Boris Johnson; Liz Truss; Rishi Sunak; Keir Starmer; Andy Burnham
- Preceded by: Simon Smith

British Ambassador to North Korea
- In office December 2018 – December 2021
- Monarch: Elizabeth II
- Prime Minister: Theresa May; Boris Johnson
- Preceded by: Alastair Morgan
- Succeeded by: David Ellis

Personal details
- Born: 18 February 1969 (age 57) Dungannon, Northern Ireland, United Kingdom
- Spouse: Young-kee Crooks
- Children: 2
- Education: University of Cambridge

Colin James Crooks LVO (born 18 February 1969) is a British diplomat serving as the British Ambassador to the Republic of Korea since 2022.

He was born in County Tyrone, Northern Ireland, and read French and German at Cambridge University.

He joined the Foreign and Commonwealth Office in 1992.

Previously he served as British Ambassador to the Democratic People's Republic of Korea from December 2018 to December 2021.

Prior to serving as the Ambassador to the DPRK, Crooks served in various other positions in Her Majesty's Diplomatic Service, and was the Minister Counsellor at the British Embassy Beijing from 2015 to 2018 and the Chargé d'Affairs to the British Embassy in Pyongyang in 2008.

In May 2020, Crooks announced via Twitter that the Pyongyang embassy had been evacuated as a result of the COVID-19 pandemic.

== Sources ==
Diplomatic posts
Preceded by Alastair Morgan	British Ambassador to North Korea; 2018–2021	Succeeded by James Hoare
Preceded by Simon Smith	British Ambassador to South Korea; 2022–present	Incumbent
