= Lara Aharonian =

Lebanese activist

- Born: 1972 (age 53–54); Beirut
- Partner: Raffi
- Children: four

Lara Aharonian (born 1972) is a Lebanese Canadian Armenian rights activist. She is the Director of the Women's Resource Centre in Yerevan. She has been recognised as a "Woman of Courage" by the United Nations.

== Life ==
Aharonian is an Armenian who was born in Beirut in 1972. The Lebanese Civil War started in 1975 and in the 1990s she left to study in Montreal. She studied Psycho-education and Comparative feminist Literature. She went to live in Armenia, and in 2003 she, Shushan Avagyan and Gohar Shahnazaryan created the Women's Resource Center in Yerevan. Their feminist aim was to challenge the patriarchal Armenian society. In 2007 she started to act as an advocate for the women of Nagorno-Karabakh. In 2008 she founded a crisis centre as a refuge to women -survivors of sexual violence.

She was one of the directors of a 2009 documentary film called Finding Zabel Yesayan about the life of the writer and dissident Zabel Yesayan. In 2013, threats against her organisation became so specific that they asked for the police to investigate. Aharonian lives in Armenia in with her husband and her four children. In 2014 she was honoured with a UN "Woman of Courage" award, presented by Kathy Leach who was the British Ambassador to Armenia.

In 2018 she gave a provocative talk concerning the rights of LGBT women and other minorities at the National Assembly. She received threats from far-right groups. She continued to speak out and in March 2019 she reported the death threats to the police.
