= Kathy Leach =

Her Excellency Kathy Leach

British Ambassador to Latvia
- Incumbent
- Assumed office July 2025
- Monarch: Charles III
- Prime Minister: Keir Starmer; Andy Burnham
- Preceded by: Paul Brummell

British Ambassador to Kazakhstan
- In office 2021–2025
- Monarchs: Elizabeth II; Charles III
- Prime Minister: Boris Johnson; Liz Truss; Rishi Sunak; Keir Starmer
- Preceded by: Michael Gifford
- Succeeded by: Sally Axworthy

British Ambassador to Armenia
- In office 2012–2015
- Monarch: Elizabeth II
- Prime Minister: David Cameron
- Preceded by: Charles Lonsdale
- Succeeded by: Judith Farnworth

Personal details
- Occupation: Diplomat

Katherine "Kathy" Jane Leach is a British diplomat, serving since August 2025 as British ambassador to Latvia.

== Career to date ==
Leach joined the Foreign Office in 2000, with a first international posting to Moscow for 2003–4, and a more substantive one to Tokyo as Head of the Energy and Environment team for 2007–11.

Leach's first Ambassadorial posting was a joint one, replacing Charles Lonsdale as Her Majesty's Ambassador in Yerevan from 2012, shared with Jonathan Aves by alternating every four months; for the last year of her posting, Leach served in the role solo. She was succeeded as ambassador to Armenia in 2015 by Judith Farnworth.

Returning to London, Leach served then as the Head and later (promoted to SMS) Deputy Director of the Policy Unit within the Foreign Office's Strategy Directorate, for 2015–2018. She worked as the Deputy Director responsible for Constitution and Devolution in the Europe Directorate during the final year or so of the Brexit negotiations from 2019 until 2020.

Leach returned to ambassadorial work in 2021 as HMA, Astana, succeeding Michael Gifford. Her four year tour ended in 2025 with her being followed as ambassador to Kazakhstan by Sally Axworthy.

Most recently as of August 2025, Leach was appointed as HMA, Riga, replacing Paul Brummell as ambassador to Latvia.
