= Deborah Bronnert =

British diplomat

Dame Deborah Bronnert DCMG
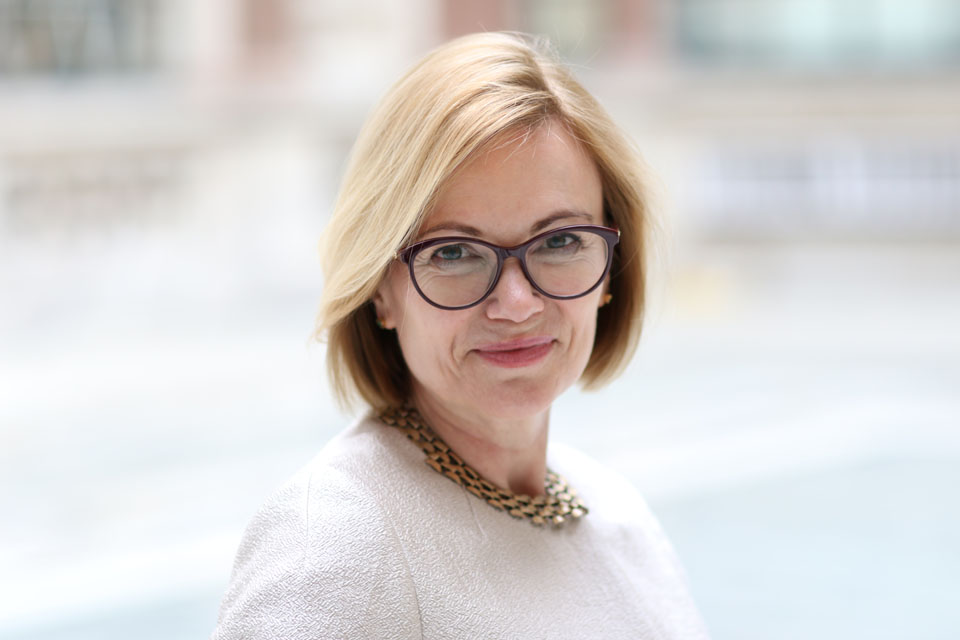

British Ambassador to Russia
- In office January 2020 – 2023
- Monarchs: Elizabeth II; Charles III
- Prime Minister: Boris Johnson; Liz Truss; Rishi Sunak
- Preceded by: Sir Laurie Bristow
- Succeeded by: Nigel Casey

British Ambassador to Zimbabwe
- In office 2011–2014
- Monarch: Elizabeth II
- Prime Minister: David Cameron
- Preceded by: Mark Canning
- Succeeded by: Catriona Laing

Personal details
- Born: Deborah Jane Bronnert; 31 January 1967 (age 59) Stockport, England
- Education: Featherstone High School
- Alma mater: University of Bristol (BSc); University College London (MA)

Dame Deborah Jane Bronnert DCMG (born 31 January 1967) is a British diplomat and civil servant. Bronnert served as British Ambassador to Russia from 2020 to 2023. Earlier in her career, she served in other positions at the Foreign and Commonwealth Office (FCO), including as Ambassador to Zimbabwe from 2011 to 2014.

== Early life and education ==
She was born on 31 January 1967 and educated at Featherstone High School, Middlesex. Bronnert attended the University of Bristol, where she read Mathematics and graduated as BSc. She then pursued further studies in the Political Economy of Russia and Eastern Europe at University College London's (UCL) School of Slavonic and East European Studies, receiving a MA degree.

== Career ==
Bronnert entered HM Civil Service in 1989, working for the Department of the Environment before being posted to the EEC UK representation in Brussels 1991–93. She then joined the Foreign and Commonwealth Office (FCO) and was posted to Brussels again from 1995 to 1999. She served in Moscow and various other posts at the FCO, before becoming British Ambassador to Zimbabwe from 2011 to 2014.

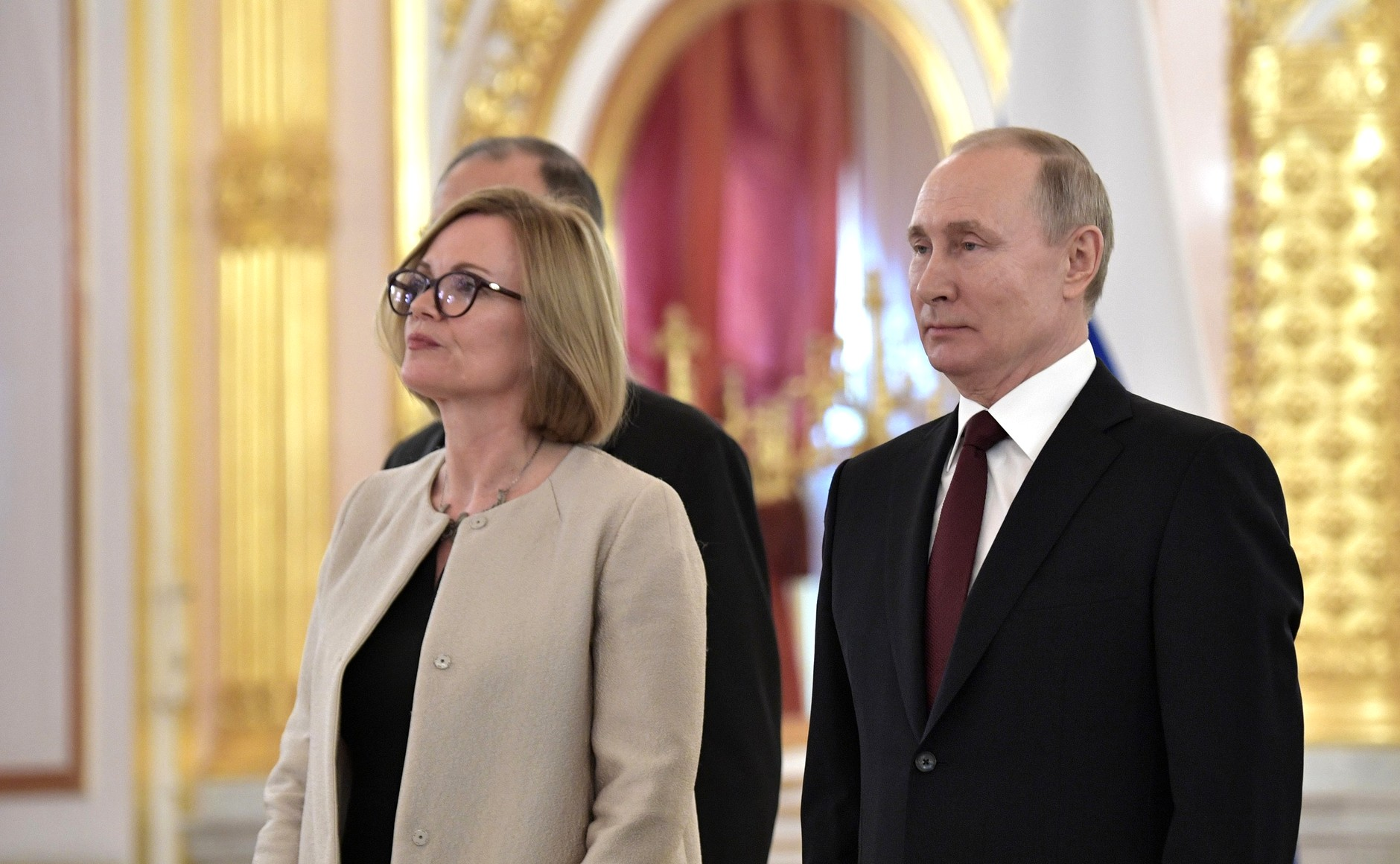
Bronnert (left) with President Vladimir Putin in 2020

She was promoted to Director-General for Economic and Global Issues at the FCO in 2017.

=== Ambassador to Russia ===
She was appointed Ambassador to Russia in January 2020. Her tenure coincided with international crises, including the onset of the COVID-19 pandemic and the 2022 Russian invasion of Ukraine. She left the position in October 2023.

In September 2024, Bronnert was appointed Director General Europe at the Foreign, Commonwealth & Development Office (FCDO). She served as Honorary President at the Russo-British Chamber of Commerce.

== Honours ==
Bronnert was appointed Companion of the Order of St Michael and St George (CMG) in the 2012 Birthday Honours and Dame Commander of the Order of St Michael and St George (DCMG) in the 2023 New Year Honours for services to British foreign policy.

== See also ==
- List of ambassadors of the United Kingdom to Russia

Diplomatic posts
Preceded by Mark Canning	British Ambassador to Zimbabwe; 2011–2014	Succeeded by Catriona Laing
Preceded by Sir Laurie Bristow	British Ambassador to Russia; 2020–2023	Succeeded by Nigel Casey
