= Stubbs Society =

University of Oxford student paper-reading and debating society

The Stubbs Society
- The Stubbs Society logo
- Named after: William Stubbs
- Formation: c. 1884
- Founder: Samuel A Brearley Jr
- Type: Student paper-reading and debating society
- Headquarters: Oxford
- Patron: General Sir Richard Shirreff
- Senior Member: Lord Mendoza
- President: James Forsdick, New College
- Website: stubbssociety.org.uk

The Stubbs Society for Foreign Affairs and Defence, commonly referred to simply as Stubbs Society, is the University of Oxford's oldest officially affiliated paper-reading and debating society (not to be confused with the unaffiliated debating society the Oxford Union). It is the university's forum for scholarship in international history, grand strategy and foreign affairs.

Named in honour of the Victorian historian, William Stubbs, in 1884, the Society has throughout its history welcomed many prominent speakers across the humanities and sciences. Its alumni include former Home Secretaries, Lord High Chancellors, Archbishops of Canterbury, world leaders, Nobel laureate recipients, Victoria Cross holders, journalists and academics. Notable past-office holders include political theorist Sir Isaiah Berlin, socialist and second-wave feminist Sheila Rowbotham, military historian Sir Charles Oman, Canadian Prime Minister Lester B. Pearson, Archbishop of Canterbury Lord Lang and Winston Churchill's Home Secretary the Earl of Kilmuir.

== Membership ==
Life membership of the society is available to anyone studying at the following institutions:

- University of Oxford
- Oxford Brookes University
- Oxford Centre for Islamic Studies
- Oxford Centre for Hebrew and Jewish Studies
- Staff members of the University of Oxford or any of its colleges or permanent private halls.

Shorter one-year memberships are also available to those participating in visiting study programmes at Oxford.

Discounted membership is given to those currently or formerly serving in His Majesty's Armed Forces. This includes the University Officers' Training Corps, the University Royal Naval Unit, and the University Air Squadron, which a significant proportion of members are associated with.

== History ==
=== Foundation ===
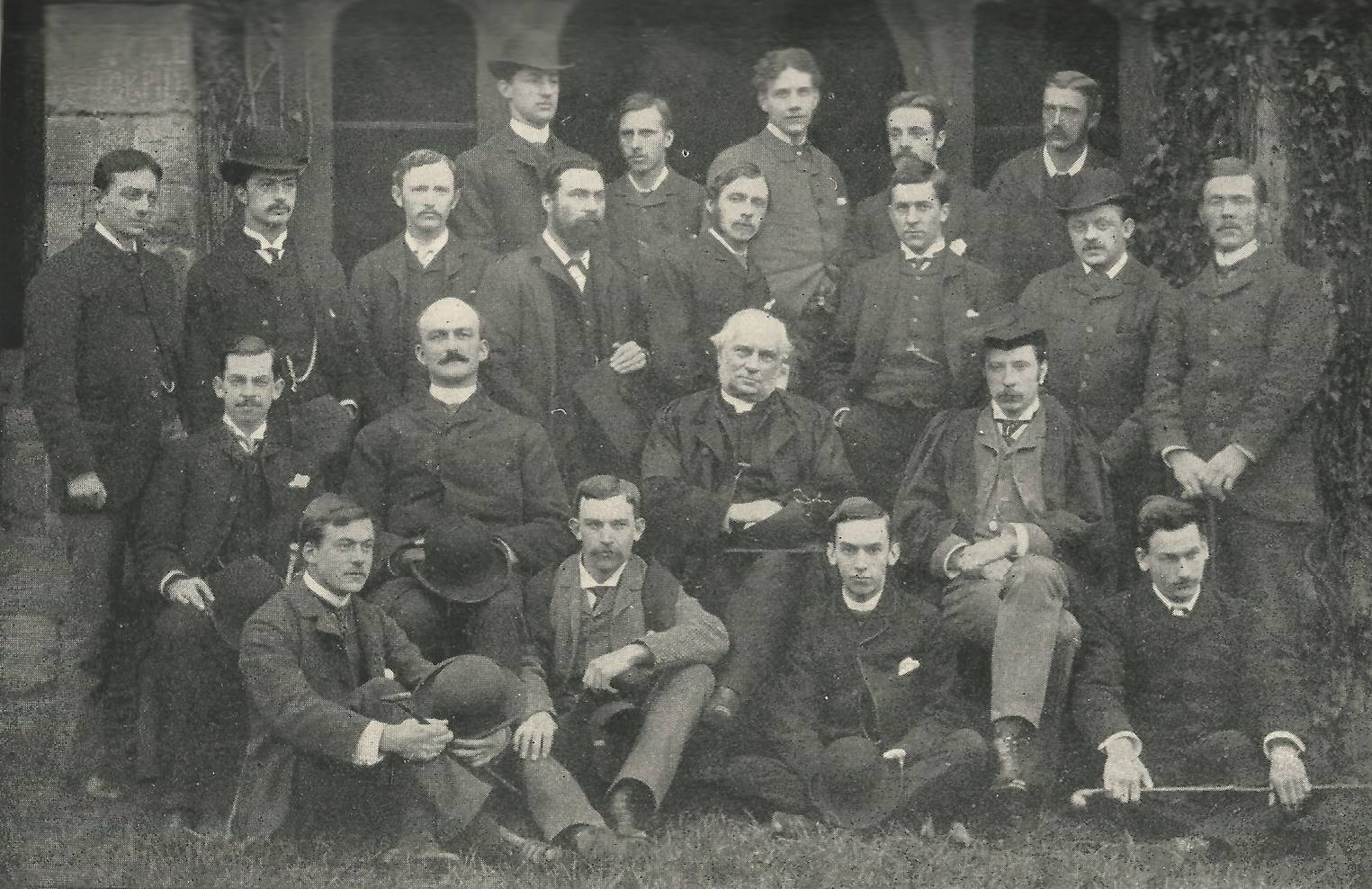
"Dr Stubbs and his adherents of the 'Historical Society', winter of 1882-83"

When an American, Samuel A. Brearley Jr., introduced the idea of the 'seminar' to Oxford in 1882, his initiative became, first, the Oxford Historical Seminar, and then, in 1884, the Stubbs Society. Functioning as a 'proving ground for future leaders and the founders of new fields of enquiry', the Society fostered critical thinking and intellectual curiosity under the aegis of dons such as Sir Charles Oman, E. A. Freeman, and with members including such future doyens of the historical profession as James Tait, Sir Charles Harding, and Frederick York Powell.

The photo to the right shows the original members of the society in which there are at least four future Members of Parliament, an Archbishop of Canterbury and some of the greatest scholars of the historical profession.

The Society's 'Transactions', largely extant from 1894 in the Bodleian Library, reveal much about its early character; but the Society resists easy characterisation. The early model has overtones of the gentleman's club, with one blackball in six enough to prevent election as a member and the Society colours being "claret, cider and coffee – the only drinks that were permitted at its meetings." The original constitution, too, declared the Society would "honour its toast to Clio in mulled claret.".

Equally, if some of the talks and debates are replete with naivety and sui generis moral judgement, discussion has often been insightful, sophisticated, and culturally inflected: for instance, a paper on Lollardy, delivered in the 1910s, provoked suggestions that Lollardy was a rhetorically-constructed vehicle for the condemnation of the enemies of the Lancastrian regime—a thesis broadly similar to that advanced by recent historians of the Lollards such as Paul Strohm. The Stubbs Society, then, seems to have always been a vigorous intellectual space, necessarily coloured by its setting, but nonetheless (indeed, in some respects, all the more) worthy of attention.

The Society has maintained throughout its existence a lively programme of social events. Indeed records of the Society's 1903 triennial dinner talk of a 7-course meal served to members. Today, the Society continues to provide opportunities for members to engage with like-minded practitioners and students with an annual garden party and dinner.

=== Female membership ===
It was Lord Beloff, the Conservative peer and university administrator, who first proposed the admission of women in 1939, some 30 years ahead of the Oxford Union. Female students from Somerville, Lady Margaret Hall and other new women's colleges joined eagerly, leading to the presidency of Ann Faber in 1942.

One of the first female members of the Society was a young Agnes Headlam-Morley who rose later to become Montague Burton Professor of International Relations - the first woman to be appointed to a chair at Oxford. Professor Headlam-Morley spoke on "British Foreign Policy During the Last Century and that of Mr Chamberlain's".

=== Past speakers ===
Historically, individuals were invited to address members of the Stubbs Society just once in their career. It was thus well-known in the world of academia and in the corridors of Westminster as one of the most prestigious invitations anyone could receive - to turn down an invitation to speak was rare. In over a century of continual activity, the Society has been addressed by a series of eminent speakers in meetings famous, sometimes notorious, for the combative discussion that ensues after a paper has been read. Indeed, Conrad Russell recalled an occasion when Geoffrey Elton was the speaker:

The first time I met Geoffrey Elton was when I was a postgraduate in 1960. After addressing the Stubbs Society in Oxford, he faced a concerted assault, begun "while Lawrence is getting his anti-tank gun into position". I rashly wandered into the cross-fire and defended him.

The speaker lineups have been appropriately diverse, ranging from Joseph Needham on the history of Chinese science, to Christopher Andrew on MI5, to Lord Sumption on the Royal Navy during the Hundred Years' War. In one instance, the author Fernández-Armesto described how "Fatally pertinent questions reduced the excellent but academically underqualified historical writer Veronica Wedgwood to tears." He continued:

I recall an occasion when a visiting professor from Lancaster, who gave a talk on an early-18th-century Tory, wilted on being asked, "What have you added to what Macaulay has to say on the subject?" Self-destructively, he burbled, "I didn't know anyone still read Macaulay." "We do in this university," rejoined his interrogator.

Other events have been contentious in their own right. On one occasion, the controversial British politician Enoch Powell was invited to address the Society on the topic of constitutional history.

In recent years, speakers have included:

- Sir Malcolm Rifkind - Former Defence Secretary and Foreign Secretary
- Sir Mark Sedwill - Former Cabinet Secretary and Head of the Home Civil Service
- Sir Geoffrey Nice - Lead prosecutor at President Slobodan Milošević's trial for war crimes
- Sir John Sawers - Former Chief of the Secret Intelligence Service (MI6)
- Sir Julian King - The last British European Commissioner
- Kate Adie - Former Chief News Correspondent for BBC News
- Lord Patten - The 28th and last Governor of Hong Kong
- Lord Houghton - Former Chief of the Defence Staff
- Lord Alderdice - First Speaker of the Northern Ireland Assembly (1998–2004)
- Ben Ferencz - Last living Nuremberg trials prosecutor
- Ciaran Martin - First CEO of the National Cyber Security Centre (United Kingdom)
- James Arroyo - Director at the Ditchley Foundation
- Sir Clive Johnstone - former Vice Admiral in the Royal Navy and Commander Allied Maritime Command
- Lord Peter Ricketts - former National Security Advisor and Ambassador to France

== Governance ==
=== Elections ===
Much rivalry exists for the Presidency of the "chief historical discussion club", particularly between the central colleges of the University: specifically between members from New College, Christ Church, Magdalen College and St John's College. Indeed, Paul Johnson, writing in the Spectator, recalled an episode involving Lord Dacre:

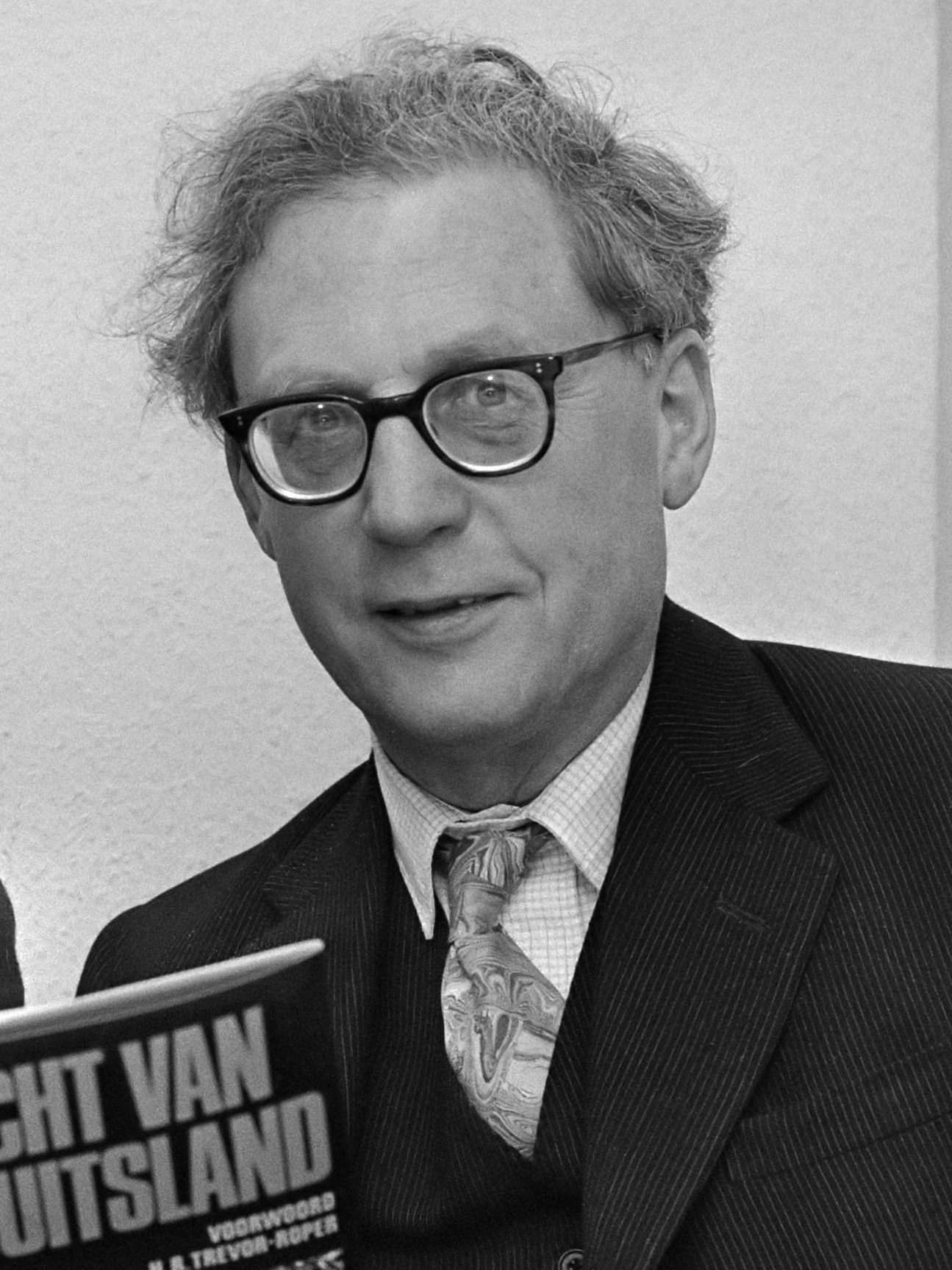
Hugh Trevor-Roper (Lord Dacre)

That term, in 1948, I was due to be elected secretary at the final meeting. As treasurer, I had noted that a suspicious number of extra subscriptions had been taken out in the previous fortnight but, not being a conspiracy theorist, had thought no more of it. However, when I and Karl Leyser arrived for the meeting, we found it packed with strangers, chiefly red-faced Christ Church louts, who looked as though they would have been more at home at a bump-supper or a Bullingdon Club grind. Roper, who was now Censor of Christ Church, had hustled them all together to vote us out of office, as indeed they did.

It was the kind of plot the CP had perfected in the British trades-union movement, and Roper had clearly studied the party's methods. His delight at the success of his scheme was so transparent and schoolboyish that I had to laugh. though the rest of the Monks [colloquial term for students at Magdalen College] were very annoyed.

Trevor-Roper later became Senior Member of the Society, but others of such diverse political persuasions as Christopher Hill have also fulfilled this role over the years.

Through much of its history, the Stubbs Society was highly selective, with membership conditional on the support of tutors. It was designed to be "an elite from which future historians are supposed to be drawn". Indeed membership was so restrictive that future greats such as A J P Taylor were not invited to join whilst studying at Oxford. Such strict regulation ensured "meetings brought dons and undergraduates together in companionable complicity".

=== Modern composition ===
The Society has open-membership to students of all disciplines. There continues to be much competition for the Presidency. Internal committee elections held at the end of every term.

Alongside the prestigious position of President there are three senior offices: Vice-President, Treasurer, and Secretary. In order to stand for President, candidates are expected to have held one of these three offices.

== Past officers ==
A list of past officers of the Stubbs Society includes:

=== Academia ===
- Sheila Rowbotham - Prominent second-wave feminist and socialist
- Sir Isaiah Berlin - Political theorist
- Sir John Hicks - Nobel Prize-winning economist
- Sir Charles Oman - Military historian and politician
- Sir William Ashley - Economic historian
- Sir Charles Firth - English Civil War historian and Regius Professor of Modern History
- Sir Frederick Powicke- Medieval historian and Regius Professor of History
- Sir Fred Clarke - Director of the Institute of Education
- Sir John Edward Lloyd - Welsh historian
- Sir James Holt - Magna Carta scholar and Fitzwilliam College, Cambridge Master
- Lord Dacre - Modern historian and Regius Professor of Modern History
- Dame Gillian Beer - Literary critic and first female President of the Society
- Catherine Hughes - Diplomat and former Principal of Somerville College
- George Norman Clark - Chichele Professor of Economic History and Provost of Oriel College
- James Tait - Medieval Historian
- Manning Clark - Australia's most famous historian
- Felipe Fernández-Armesto - Historian
- Roger Howell Jr. - Former President of Bowdoin College
- John Henry Whitehead - President of the London Mathematical Society
- John Farquhar Fulton - Neurophysiologist
- Gareth Stedman Jones - Marxist historian
- Lawrence Stone - English Civil War historian
- Karl Leyser - Medieval historian
- Keith Robbins - Former Vice-chancellor of the University of Wales
- Alan Deyermond - Hispanist
- Kenneth McFarlane - Medieval historian
- Samuel A Brearley Jr - Pioneer of women's education and founder of the Brearley School

=== Politics and government ===
- Lester B. Pearson - Former Canadian Prime Minister and Nobel laureate
- Earl of Kilmuir - Former Home Secretary, Lord High Chancellor and Nuremberg prosecutor
- Walt Whitman Rostow - Former US National Security Advisor
- Lt Gen Sir Adrian Carton de Wiart - Victoria Cross holder
- Sir John Marriott - Educationist and Conservative Member of parliament
- Sir Ryland Adkins - Senior British Judge and Liberal politician
- Sir Michael Wheeler-Booth - Clerk of the Parliaments
- Sir Robert Birley - Anti-apartheid campaigner and headmaster of Charterhouse and Eton College
- Lord Beloff - Conservative life peer and prominent Eurosceptic
- Lord Monk Bretton - Peer of the Realm
- Earl Russell - Historian and Liberal Democrat peer
- Thomas Ellis - Leader of the Welsh home-rule campaign Cymru Fydd
- Simon Manley - British Diplomat
- Charles Lonsdale - British Diplomat

=== Religion ===
- Lord Lang - Former Archbishop of Canterbury
- Hensley Henson - Former Bishop of Durham
- William Holden Hutton - Former Dean of Winchester
- Dr Alexander Carlyle - Former Canon Treasurer of Truro Cathedral
- Philip Caraman - Jesuit priest and author

=== Broadcasting and journalism ===
- Paul Johnson - Writer and recipient of the Presidential Medal of Freedom
- Manicasothy Saravanamuttu - Sri Lankan journalist and diplomat
- Michael Davie - Journalist and biographer
- Matthew d'Ancona - Journalist and Editor
- Guy Browning - Journalist and after-dinner speaker

=== Business ===
- Nigel Higgins - Chairman of Barclays Bank

== Past Presidents ==
=== Key ===
- All Souls
- Balliol
- Brasenose
- Christ Church
- Corpus Christi
- Exeter
- Green Templeton
- Harris Manchester
- Hertford
- Jesus
- Keble
- Kellogg
- Lady Margaret Hall
- Linacre
- Lincoln
- Magdalen
- Mansfield
- Merton
- New College
- Nuffield
- Oriel
- Pembroke
- Queen's
- Regent's Park
- Somerville
- St Anne's
- St Antony's
- St Catherine's
- St Cross
- St Edmund Hall
- St Hilda's
- St Hugh's
- St John's
- St Peter's
- Trinity
- University
- Wadham
- Wolfson
- Worcester

=== Presidents 1907-1919 ===
Year	Michaelmas	Hilary	Trinity
1907-1908	W. E. Drury	C. E. Bax	Reverend H. Hill
1908-1909	Reverend H. Hill	G. D. Macleon	Captain L. Fullbrook-Leggatt MC
1909-1910	Captain L. Fullbrook-Leggatt MC	Captain L. Fullbrook-Leggatt MC	Reverend E. N. Moore MC
1910-1911	Reverend E. N. Moore MC	R. H. Atkinson	R. A. Edwards
1911-1912	G. R. Hunter	Captain N. Johnstone Sievers	H. G. Evans
1912-1913	F. H. Brabat	Reverend H. Chamberlain	W. R. Smale
1913-1914	A. N. Carew Hunt	A. N. Carew Hunt	A. R. Herron
1914-1915	N. E. Field Jones	P. Hactill	E. W. B. Pim
1915-1916	Reverend E. H. Fendrick	Reverend L. J. a'Andria	G. S. Gregern
1916-1917	R. F. Butler	Reverend L. J. a'Andria	D. T. Nelson
1917-1918	F. S. Cameron-Head	F. S. Cameron-Head	C. R. S. Yavis
1918-1919	J. L. C. Rodrigo	R. D. Wormald	

=== Presidents 1983-1993 ===
Year	Michaelmas	Hilary	Trinity
1983-1984	Dora Thornton	Richard Harris	Roderick Macpherson
1985-1986	Guy Browning and Frances Barr	Roger Wood	Charles Lonsdale
1986-1987	Mark Muldowney	Philip Murphy	Simon Manley
1987-1988	Susan Holliday	Matthew d'Ancona	David Moody
1988-1989	Jane Whewell	Carolyn Fooks	Andrew Howard
1989-1990	Maria Quantrill	David Rundle	Philip Sellars
1991-1992		Toby Purser	Simon Taylor
1992-1993	Jonathan Dawson	Jeremy Goldring	Eleanor Brown

=== Presidents 2018-Today ===
Year	Michaelmas	Hilary	Trinity
2017-2018	N/A	Arun Dawson	Arun Dawson
2018-2019	Arun Dawson	Oscar Davies	Madeleine Moore
2019-2020	Madeleine Moore	Madeleine Moore	Joe Davies
2020-2021	Joe Davies	Joe Davies	Johnny Sturgeon
2021-2022	Johnny Sturgeon	Jack Stacey	Jack Stacey
2022-2023	Isaaq Tomkins	Isaaq Tomkins	Joe Bradshaw
2023-2024	Adam Tomkinson	Becky Collett and Minh Tran	Rosanna Carrick-Daly
2024-2025	James Forsdick	Junsoo Kim	Dominic O'Loughlin
2025-2026	Elliot Francolla	Maxwell Benster	Amelie Addison
2026-2027	Amala Leonard		

== In popular culture ==
In the Village Tales series by G. M. W. Wemyss, the Duchess of Taunton is described as a former member of the Stubbs Society.

== See also ==
- Oxford Union Society
- Cambridge Union
- Yale Political Union - with whom the Stubbs Society has a historic relationship.
- Berkeley Forum
- Olivaint Conference of Belgium
