= List of Puntland–Somaliland prisoner exchanges =

Puntland prisoner exchanges are POWs exchange and armistice between Puntland and Somaliland of prisoners during the Puntland–Somaliland conflict. Puntland has exchanged POWs with its neighbour Somaliland. It included several rounds of prisoners exchanges between Puntland and Somaliland.

== List of prisoner exchanges ==
=== Las Anod conflict ===
On 25 August 2023, Puntland defeated Somaliland and recaptured Las Anod. In the following month of September, the International Committee of the Red Cross (ICRC) visited more than 500 prisoners captured during the clashes between the Puntland army and Somaliland forces in Las Anod. Pascal Cuttat, the head of the ICRC delegation in Somalia, confirmed the organization had visited both Garowe Central prison and Hargeisa Central Prison, where prisoners were held.

In October 2023, the UN Secretary-General's Special Representative for Somalia, Catriona Laing, has requested on the Puntland and Somaliland to peacefully exchange their captured prisoners of war.

On 29 April 2025, Puntland and Somaliland announced to exchange prisoners which was described as a positive step by both governments to mend relations badly frayed by the Las Anod conflict. The release by Puntland of 15 prisoners and 11 by Somaliland is a commendable confidence-building step which many hope will pave the way to normalisation and cooperative relations.

Later Puntland and Somaliland were conducted a prisoner exchange, seen as a step toward easing tensions. Puntland’s Minister of Justice, Mohamed Abdi Wahaab, said 15 prisoners captured during the 2023 Sool conflict were handed over to Somaliland, while Puntland received 11 detainees in return. He called the move a “confidence-building measure” aimed at restoring peaceful relations and reuniting detained Somali youth with their families.

On 30 April 2025, a private plane departed from Garowe airport carrying 15 Somaliland army prisoners was landed in Hargeisa airport and returned with 11 Puntland prisoners released by Somaliland. The exchange was mediated by the ICRC.

Puntland releases 15 prisoners of war in exchange for Somaliland releasing 11 prisoners of war of combatants captured during the conflict of Las Anod.

== See also ==
- Puntland–Somaliland dispute
- Las Anod conflict (2023–present)
