= List of ambassadors of the United Kingdom to North Korea =

British Ambassador to the Democratic People's Republic of Korea
- Coat of arms of the United Kingdom
- Incumbent; Simon Wood since September 2025
- Style: His Excellency
- Residence: Munsu-Dong Compound, Pyongyang
- Inaugural holder: James Hoare (Chargé d'affaires)
- Formation: 2001
- Website: British Embassy Pyongyang

The British ambassador to North Korea is head of the United Kingdom's diplomatic mission to North Korea. The official title is His Britannic Majesty's Ambassador to the Democratic People's Republic of Korea (DPRK). The current ambassador is Simon Wood, who has held the role since September 2025.

== History ==
Under the Imperial Chinese tributary system, Korea was a tributary state to China. After the United Kingdom–Korea Treaty of 1883 British Ministers to China were appointed as "Her Majesty's Envoy Extraordinary and Minister Plenipotentiary to His Majesty the Emperor of China, and also Her Majesty's Envoy Extraordinary and Minister Plenipotentiary to His Majesty the King of Corea." Britain also appointed consuls-general to be resident in Seoul, but they were not heads of mission, as the head of mission was the minister in Peking (now Beijing). In 1898, following the First Sino-Japanese War (1894–95), the Korean Empire became independent of China, and Britain appointed a chargé d'affaires who became Minister Resident when the United Kingdom and Korea exchanged envoys in 1901.

== Consul-General in Seoul ==
- 1884–1885: William George Aston
- 1889–1896: Walter Hillier
- 1896-1898: John Jordan

== Head of mission to Korea ==
=== Minister to China, non-resident Minister to Korea ===
- 1884–1885: Sir Harry Smith Parkes
- 1885–1892: Sir John Walsham, 2nd Baronet
- 1892–1895: Sir Nicholas O'Conor
- 1896–1898: Sir Claude MacDonald

=== Chargé d'affaires ===
- 1898–1901: John Jordan

=== Minister Resident ===
- 1901–1905: Sir John Jordan

Under the Japan–Korea Treaty of 1905 Korea became a protectorate of Japan, and Britain and other countries withdrew diplomatic missions from Seoul. After World War II Japan's rule ended and Korea was occupied by the Soviet Union and United States, resulting in division of Korea between the Democratic People's Republic of Korea (North Korea) and the Republic of Korea (South Korea).

== Head of mission to North Korea ==
After Britain and North Korea re-established diplomatic relations in 2000, James Hoare was appointed British Chargé d'affaires in Pyongyang; and his work laid the foundation for the establishment of a full embassy in the North Korean capital.

The British Embassy in Pyongyang opened in July 2001. David Slinn was the first British Ambassador; he arrived in Pyongyang in November 2002.

=== Chargé d'affaires in North Korea ===
- James Hoare, 2001–2002

=== Ambassador to North Korea ===
Name	Tenure begins	Tenure ends	British monarch	Supreme leader
David Slinn	2002	2006	Elizabeth II	Kim Jong-il
John Everard	2006	2008	Elizabeth II	Kim Jong-il
Peter Hughes	2008	2011	Elizabeth II	Kim Jong-il
Karen Wolstenholme	2011	2012	Elizabeth II	Kim Jong-un
Michael Gifford	2012	2015	Elizabeth II	Kim Jong-un
Alastair Morgan	2015	2018	Elizabeth II	Kim Jong-un
Colin Crooks	2018	2022	Elizabeth II	Kim Jong-un
David Ellis	2022	2025	Elizabeth II	Kim Jong-un
David Ellis	2022	2025	Charles III	Kim Jong-un
Simon Wood	2025		Charles III	Kim Jong-un

== See also ==
- Embassy of the United Kingdom, Pyongyang
- List of diplomatic missions of the United Kingdom
- List of diplomatic missions in North Korea
- List of ambassadors of the United Kingdom to South Korea
