= South Wilts Grammar School =

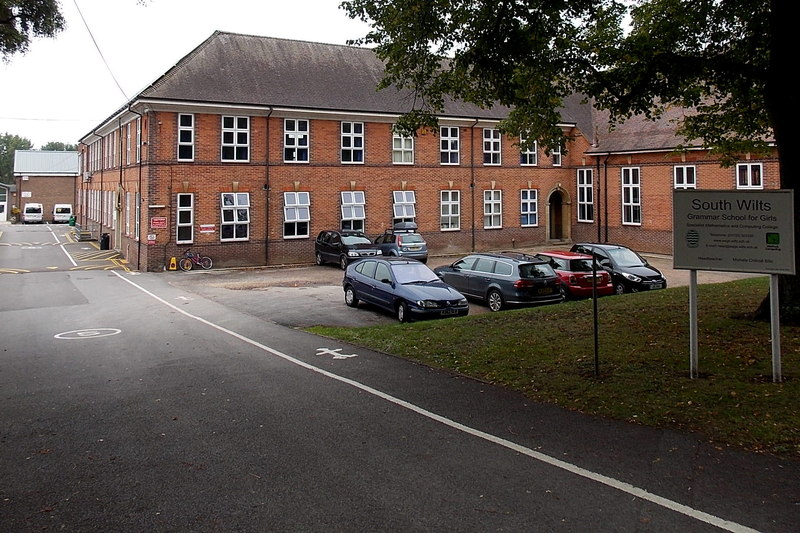

Location
- Stratford Road; Salisbury, Wiltshire, SP1 3JJ; England; 51°04′47″N 1°47′57″W

Information
- Type: Academy
- Motto: Be Kind, Be Involved, Be Aspirational
- Established: 1927; 99 years ago
- Specialist: Mathematics and Computing College
- Department for Education URN: 136391 Tables
- Ofsted: Reports
- Chair of trustees: Liz Ogilvie
- Head teacher: Amanda Smith
- Staff: over 100
- Gender: Girls (boys only in 6th form not lower school)
- Age: 11 to 18
- Enrolment: 1,200 (September 2026)
- Houses: Avon, Bourne, Ebble, Nadder, Wylye
- Colours: Green and blue
- Website: www.swgs.wilts.sch.uk

South Wilts Grammar School, formerly South Wilts Secondary School (1927-1944) and South Wilts Grammar School for Girls (1945-2020), is a grammar school in Salisbury, south Wiltshire, England, for students aged 11 to 18. Established in 1927, the school converted to an academy in 2011. In 2020, the name was changed to South Wilts Grammar School to reflect the admission of male students into the sixth form in September of that year.

== History ==
A secondary school for girls, based in Salisbury and to serve the south Wiltshire area, was due to be built in 1913. Unfortunately, the first world war delayed this project and girls continued to attend Bishop Wordsworth's School until 1927.

South Wilts Secondary School was finally opened in September 1927 and new students as well as female students who had previously been at Bishop Wordsworth’s School transferred to the newly built site on Stratford Road, Salisbury. The school opened with just 14 members of staff and 207 students, with the original site consisting of the main red brick ‘Old Building’, which was only partly double storied, and the Gymnasium which is now the Small Hall.

During the second world war, evacuated pupils from Portsmouth Southern Secondary School for girls came to live in Salisbury and attend South Wilts Secondary School. An Air Raid Precaution Centre and First Aid Post was also established in the school for the residents of the local area and shelters and trenches were built in the school grounds.

It became a grammar school after the Education Act 1944 and the name changed from South Wilts Secondary School to South Wilts Grammar School for Girls.

Due to the increasing numbers of students, new buildings were added to the site in 1958 and 1963.

The school gained specialist status in mathematics and computing in 2003, and in 2010 was accredited with the International School Award. It became an academy in January 2011.

In 2009, it was the top-achieving school in Salisbury, including independent schools. Entry is by a selective entrance examination known as the eleven-plus.

Since September 2020, the school admits boys to its sixth form.

South Wilts Grammar School was named State Secondary School of the Year for the South West by The Sunday Times Parent Power Guide 2026.

== The School Badge, Motto and Values ==
The School Badge, which consists of five white wavy lines on a green background, signify the five rivers which flow through the Salisbury area; the Avon, the Bourne, the Ebble, the Nadder and the Wylye. These river names are also the names of the School Houses.

The School Motto is 'Onwards' - providing an education that prepares students to embrace their futures with confidence.

The School Values are Be Kind, Be Involved, Be Aspirational.

== List of Headteachers ==
- Dr Amanda Smith 2024 - present
- Mrs Michele Chilcott 2011 - 2024
- Mrs Fran Stratton 2003 - 2011
- Mrs Marian Freeman 1991 - 2003
- Mrs Diana Lord 1988 - 1991
- Miss Vincente Matthews 1970 - 1987
- Miss Margaret Briggs 1953 - 1969
- Miss G A Moore 1927 - 1953

== Notable former pupils ==
- Anna Brecon, Emmerdale actress
- Sophie Unwin, cyclist
- Carolyn Browne, former Ambassador to Azerbaijan
- Sally Clark, lawyer
- Helen Dawes, Anglican priest and academic
- Norvela Forster, MEP from 1979 to 1984 for Birmingham South
- Penny Tranter, BBC weather forecaster
- Jenny Pearson, author

== Teacher misconduct cases ==
In 2015, Debbie Evans, who had been head of art at South Wilts until she resigned in 2013, was banned from teaching for life after being found guilty of unacceptable professional conduct for having a two-year affair with an ex-student.

In April 2018, computing teacher Ashley Bakewell admitted to taking inappropriate photos of female pupils at South Wilts without their knowledge, stating that he was particularly attracted to their long hair. He was banned from teaching indefinitely.
