= Peter Hughes (diplomat) =

British diplomat (born 1953)

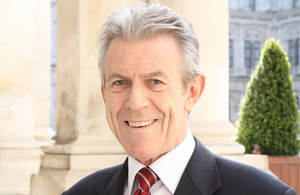
Peter Hughes

Peter John Hughes OBE (born 14 September 1953) is a British diplomat. From 2013 to 2018 he was the British High Commissioner to Belize.

Hughes joined the Foreign and Commonwealth Office (FCO) in 1976 and served in Islamabad, Rome, Warsaw, Sydney, Castries, Colombo and Kabul before being appointed Ambassador to North Korea in 2008 where he served until 2011. In 2009 he wrote a blog entry that noted the fair weather and festive mood in Pyongyang during that year's parliamentary election, prompting accusations in the British and South Korean press that he was an apologist for the North Korean government.

== Honours ==
Hughes was appointed Officer of the Order of the British Empire (OBE) in the 2012 Birthday Honours.

== See also ==
- 2009 North Korean parliamentary election

Diplomatic posts
Preceded by John Everard	British Ambassador to North Korea; 2008–2011	Succeeded by Karen Wolstenholme
Preceded by Patrick Ashworth	British High Commissioner to Belize; 2013–2018	Succeeded by Claire Evans
