= Axworthy =

Axworthy is a surname. Notable people with the name include:

- Chris Axworthy (1947–2023), Canadian politician
- Lloyd Axworthy (born 1939), Canadian politician, statesman and academic
- Michael Axworthy (1962–2019), British academic, author and commentator
- Sally Axworthy (born 1964), British diplomat
- Tom Axworthy (born 1947), Canadian civil servant, political strategist, writer and professor
