= List of ambassadors of the United Kingdom to Kazakhstan =

The ambassador of the United Kingdom to Kazakhstan is the United Kingdom's foremost diplomatic representative in the Republic of Kazakhstan, and head of the UK's diplomatic mission in Nur-Sultan. The official title is His Britannic Majesty's Ambassador to the Republic of Kazakhstan.

Until 2012 the ambassador to Kazakhstan served concurrently as the non-resident Ambassador to Kyrgyzstan, an ambassadorial position in its own right.

== Ambassadors ==
- 1993–1995: Noel Jones
- 1995–1999: Douglas McAdam
- 1999–2002: Richard Lewington
- 2002–2005: James Sharp
- 2005–2009: Paul Brummell
- 2009–2012: David Moran
- 2013–2018: Carolyn Browne
- 2018–2021: Michael Gifford
- 2021–2025: Kathy Leach
- 2025–present: Sally Axworthy
