= Shushan Avagyan =

Armenian author and translator (born 1976)

Shushan Avagyan (born 1976) is an Armenian author, translator and associate professor at the American University of Armenia's College of Humanities and Social Sciences, where she is the coordinator of the Graduate Certificate in Translation Program.

Avagyan has translated into English a volume of Shushanik Kurghinian’s poetry, as well as works by Russian critics Boris Arvatov and Viktor Shklovsky. Her articles and translations have been published in academic journals including Contemporary Women's Writing, The Review of Contemporary Fiction, Asymptote, and The Los Angeles Review of Books. In 2003, she co-founded the Women's Resource Center in Yerevan with Lara Aharonian and Gohar Shahnazaryan.

Avagyan's debut novel, Girq-anvernagir (A Book, Untitled), was published in 2006. The English translation was a winner of the English PEN Translates Award in 2023.

== Early life ==
Avagyan was born in 1976 in Soviet Armenia. As a child, she lived in Zambia and Ethiopia with her parents, who taught there due to the Soviet Teach Abroad Program. After graduating from Khachik Dashtents School in Yerevan, she moved to Cyprus to study at the Melkonian Educational Institute in Nicosia. She received her undergraduate degree in studio art at Cedar Crest College, and her master's and doctoral degrees in English studies from Illinois State University.

== Awards ==
- 2023: English PEN Translates Award for A Book, Untitled
- 2024: MSA Translation Book Prize for A Book, Untitled

== Works ==
=== Novels ===
- Girq-anvernagir, samizdat, 2006 (A Book, Untitled, Awst Press, 2023; trans. Deanna Cachoian-Schanz) (Libro senza nome, Utopia, 2024; trans. Minas Lourian). ISBN 99930-4-583-7 (Eastern Armenian); ISBN 978-1-911284-88-8 (English); ISBN 979-12-80084-84-2 (Italian).
- Queered: What’s to be done with Xcentric art? (co-author), the Queering Yerevan (QY) Collective, 2011
- Zarubyani Kanayq (with Lusine Talalyan), samizdat, 2014.

=== Translations ===
- Shushanik Kurghinian, I want to live: Poems of Shushanik Kurghinian, Armenian International Women's Association, 2005. ISBN 978-0-9648787-5-4
- Viktor Shklovsky, Energy of Delusion: A Book on Plot, Dalkey Archive Press, 2007. ISBN 978-1-56478-426-1
- Arkadii Dragomoshchenko, Dust (with Evgeny Pavlov, Thomas Epstein and Ana Lucic): Dalkey Archive Press, 2009. ISBN 978-1-56478-419-3
- Viktor Shklovsky, Bowstring: On the Dissimilarity of the Similar, Dalkey Archive Press, 2011. ISBN 978-1-56478-425-4
- Viktor Shklovsky, A Hunt for Optimism, Dalkey Archive Press, 2013. ISBN 978-1-56478-823-8
- Viktor Shklovsky, The Hamburg Score, Dalkey Archive Press, 2017.
- Boris Arvatov, Art and Production, Pluto Press, 2017. ISBN 978-0-7453-3736-4
- Hovhannes Tumanyan, Quatrains, 2019. ISBN 978-9939-858-13-5
- Viktor Shklovsky, On the Theory of Prose, Dalkey Archive Press, 2021. ISBN 978-1-56478-769-9

=== Articles ===
- (Un)Disciplining Traumatic Memory: Mission Orphanages and the Afterlife of Genocide in Micheline Aharonian Marcom’s The Daydreaming Boy (with Rebecca Saunders), Contemporary Women's Writing, 2010
- Traumatic Infidelities: Translating the Literature of the Armenian Genocide, 2012
- Violent Phenomena: 21 essays on Translation, Titled Axis Press, 2021. ISBN 978-1-911284-78-9
