= Michael Gifford =

British diplomat (born 1961)

His Excellency Michael Gifford OBE
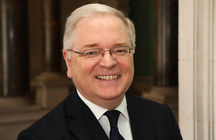
- Gifford in 2012

British Ambassador to Kazakhstan
- In office January 2018 – March 2021
- Monarchs: Elizabeth II; Charles III
- Prime Minister: Theresa May; Boris Johnson; Liz Truss; Rishi Sunak
- Preceded by: Carolyn Browne
- Succeeded by: Kathy Leach

British Ambassador to North Korea
- In office 2012–2015
- Monarch: Elizabeth II
- Prime Minister: David Cameron
- Preceded by: Karen Wolstenholme
- Succeeded by: Alastair Morgan

British Ambassador to Yemen
- In office 2004–2007
- Monarch: Elizabeth II
- Prime Minister: Tony Blair
- Preceded by: Frances Guy
- Succeeded by: Timothy Torlot

Personal details
- Born: Michael John Gifford; 2 April 1961 (age 65)
- Spouse: Patricia Owen
- Children: 2
- Education: Hastings Grammar School

Michael John Gifford OBE (born 2 April 1961) is a British diplomat who was the United Kingdom's Ambassador to Kazakhstan from January 2018 March 2021.

== Career ==
Gifford joined the Foreign and Commonwealth Office in 1981. From 2004 until 2007 he served as the British Ambassador to Yemen. He was then the Deputy Head of Mission in Cairo. He became the Ambassador to North Korea in October 2012. He left that appointment in December 2015 and was succeeded by Alastair Morgan. After full-time Russian language training he was appointed to be the Ambassador to Kazakhstan from early 2018. He will leave this post in late summer 2021 and retire from the Diplomatic Service.

Gifford was appointed Officer of the Order of the British Empire (OBE) in the 2022 New Year Honours for services to British foreign policy.

== Personal life ==
Gifford is married to his wife, Patricia, and the couple have one son and one daughter.

Diplomatic posts
Preceded by Frances Guy	British Ambassador to Yemen; 2004–2007	Succeeded by Timothy Torlot
Preceded by Karen Wolstenholme	British Ambassador to North Korea; 2012–2015	Succeeded by Alastair Morgan
Preceded by Carolyn Browne	British Ambassador to Kazakhstan; 2018–present	Incumbent
