= Alastair Morgan =

British diplomat

His Excellency Alastair Morgan CMG
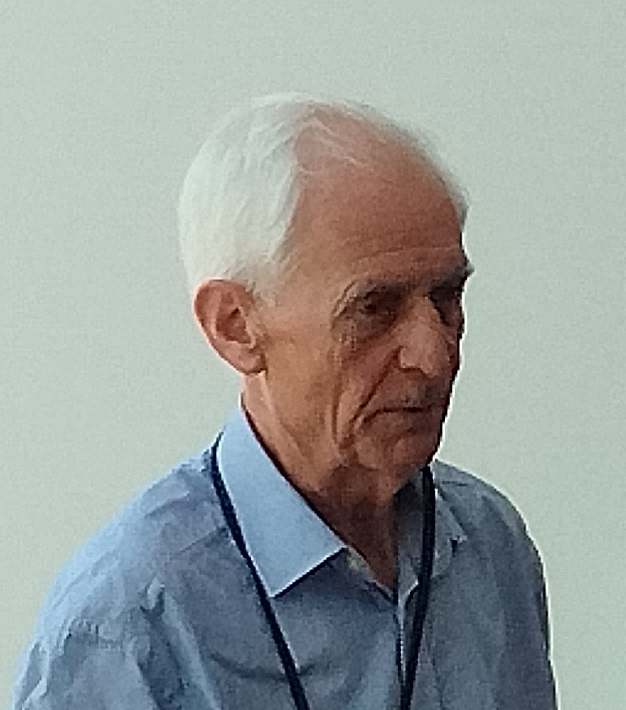

British Ambassador to North Korea
- In office December 2015 – December 2018
- Monarch: Elizabeth II
- Prime Minister: David Cameron; Theresa May
- Preceded by: Michael Gifford
- Succeeded by: Colin Crooks

Personal details
- Born: 28 May 1958 (age 67) Camberley, Surrey, England
- Occupation: Diplomat

Alastair William James Morgan CMG (born 28 May 1958) is a British diplomat. He was the United Kingdom ambassador to the Democratic People's Republic of Korea.

In his diplomatic career, he served mainly in East Asia especially in China and Japan; namely, First Secretary in Tokyo from 1991 to 1996, Director of Investment in Tokyo from 2002 to 2006, Commercial Counsellor in Beijing from 2007 to 2010, and as Consul-General in Guangzhou from 2010 to 2014. He then served as the British ambassador to North Korea from December 2015 to December 2018, after which he was replaced by Colin Crooks.

Morgan was appointed a Companion of the Order of St Michael and St George in the New Year Honours for 2019.

Diplomatic posts
Preceded by Michael Gifford	British Ambassador to North Korea; 2015–2018	Succeeded by Colin Crooks
Preceded by Brian Davidson	British Consul-General in Guangzhou; 2010–2014	Succeeded by Matthew Rous
