= Noel Jones (diplomat) =

British diplomat (1940–1995)

Noel Andrew Stephen Jones (22 December 1940 – 21 November 1995) was an Indian-born British diplomat, British ambassador to Kazakhstan from 1993 to 1995. He was the first British ambassador to have come from an ethnic minority.

His father, Ernest Walter Jones, was a domiciled European who worked in the Telegraph Department in India; his mother, Merlyn Edith Jones (née Jones), was an Anglo-Indian woman, daughter of a Postmaster of Madras.

Noel Jones came to live in England, where he married Jean Rosemary Cheval. He had a wife, Jean, and they had two children, Mark and Alison.

He entered the diplomatic service and was appointed British ambassador to Kazakhstan in 1993. His career was cut short by his death in 1995, at the age of 54.
