= Carolyn Browne =

British diplomat

Carolyn Browne CMG
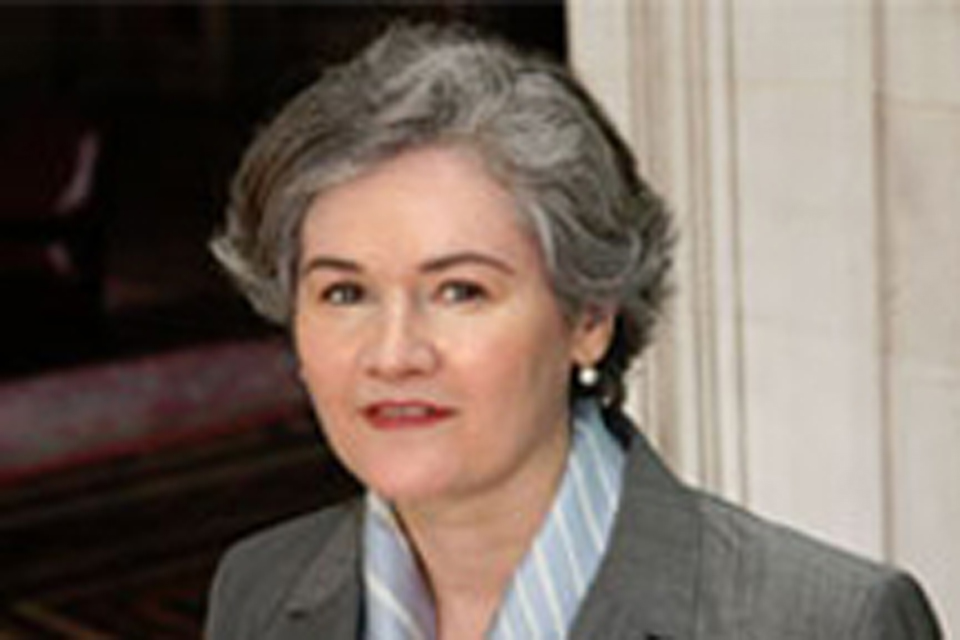

British Ambassador to Kazakhstan
- In office 2013–2018
- Monarch: Elizabeth II
- Prime Minister: David Cameron; Theresa May
- Preceded by: David Moran
- Succeeded by: Michael Gifford

British Ambassador to Azerbaijan
- In office 2007–2011
- Monarch: Elizabeth II
- Prime Minister: Tony Blair; Gordon Brown; David Cameron
- Preceded by: Laurie Bristow
- Succeeded by: Peter Bateman

Personal details
- Born: 19 October 1958 (age 67) Yorkshire, England
- Education: South Wilts Grammar School for Girls
- Alma mater: University of Bristol (BSc); Linacre College, Oxford (DPhil)

Carolyn Browne CMG (born 19 October 1958) is a British diplomat who was the British Ambassador to Kazakhstan from 2013 to 2018.

== Early life ==
She is the daughter of the late Brigadier Christopher Browne OBE and Margaret Howard. She attended the South Wilts Grammar School for Girls.

From the University of Bristol, she gained a BSc degree in Microbiology. From Linacre College, Oxford she gained a DPhil in Bacterial Genetics in 1985.

== Career ==
She joined HM Diplomatic Service in 1985. From 1988–91 she was a First Secretary in Moscow. From 1993–97 she was at the United Kingdom Mission to the United Nations (UKMIS). From 2002–05 she worked for the Permanent Representatives of the United Kingdom to the European Union.

In 2007 she became the Ambassador to Azerbaijan (Her Majesty's Ambassador to the Republic of Azerbaijan). Her appointment had been announced in December 2006.

On 1 October 2007 she received a visit from Prince Andrew, Duke of York. He met the President of BP Azerbaijan in Baku, and had a dinner given by the President of the Republic of Azerbaijan, Ilham Aliyev. The Prince visited again on 1 June 2009 for an exhibition at the Heydar Aliyev Sports and Exhibition Complex and an event given by the British Business Group of Azerbaijan, and later attended a dinner given by the Ambassador. The Prince visited on 26 November 2010, where he had another dinner, given by the President of the Republic of Azerbaijan.

In July 2011 she took leave of President Aliyev at the end of her mission to Azerbaijan. Her appointment to Kazakhstan was announced in July 2012 and she took up the post in April 2013. In January 2017 the Foreign and Commonwealth Office announced that she was to be replaced in early 2018 and was to transfer to another Diplomatic Service appointment.

Browne was appointed Companion of the Order of St Michael and St George (CMG) "for services to British foreign policy" in the 2017 Birthday Honours.

On 1 February 2019, she joined the Technical Secretariat of the Organisation for the Prohibition of Chemical Weapons (OPCW) as the Director of Verification.

Diplomatic posts
Preceded by Laurie Bristow	British Ambassador to Azerbaijan; 2007–2011	Succeeded by Peter Bateman
Preceded by David Moran	British Ambassador to Kazakhstan; 2013–2018	Succeeded by Michael Gifford
