= Paul Brummell =

British diplomat and travel writer (born 1965)

His Excellency Paul Brummell CMG
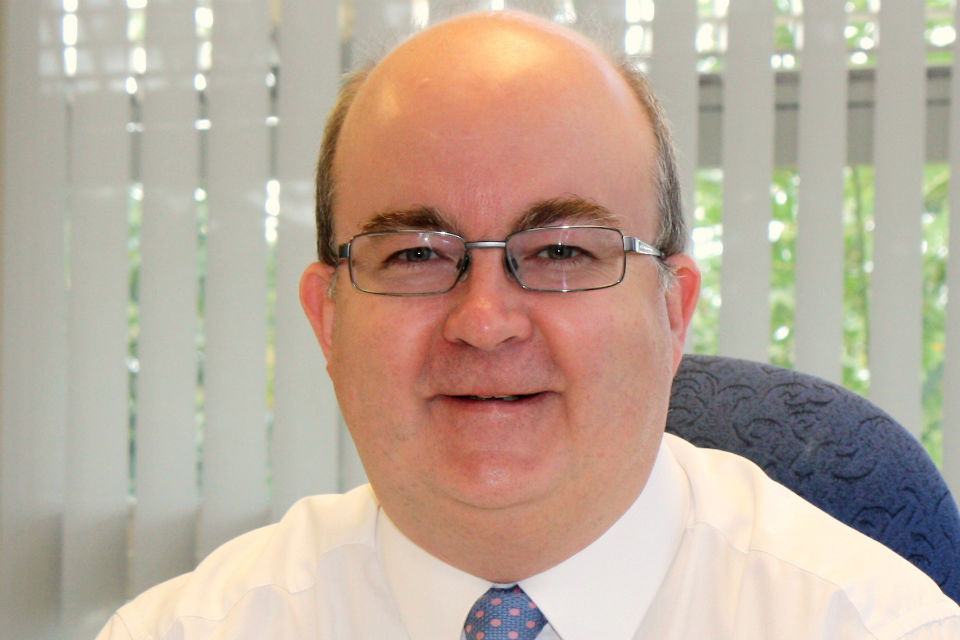

British Ambassador to Latvia
- In office July 2021 – July 2025
- Monarchs: Elizabeth II; Charles III
- Prime Minister: Boris Johnson; Liz Truss; Rishi Sunak; Keir Starmer
- Preceded by: Keith Shannon
- Succeeded by: Kathy Leach

British Ambassador to Romania
- In office 2014–2018
- Monarch: Elizabeth II
- Prime Minister: David Cameron; Theresa May
- Preceded by: Martin Harris
- Succeeded by: Andrew Noble

British High Commissioner to Barbados and other Caribbean countries
- In office 2010–2013
- Monarch: Elizabeth II
- Prime Minister: David Cameron
- Preceded by: Duncan Taylor
- Succeeded by: Victoria Dean

British Ambassador to Kazakhstan and Kyrgyzstan
- In office 2005–2009
- Monarch: Elizabeth II
- Prime Minister: Tony Blair; Gordon Brown
- Preceded by: James Lyall Sharp
- Succeeded by: David Moran

British Ambassador to Turkmenistan
- In office 2002–2005
- Monarch: Elizabeth II
- Prime Minister: Tony Blair
- Preceded by: Fraser Wilson
- Succeeded by: Peter Butcher

Personal details
- Born: 28 August 1965 (age 60)
- Education: St Albans School
- Alma mater: St Catharine's College, Cambridge
- Occupation: Diplomat, travel writer

Paul Brummell CMG (born 28 August 1965) is a British diplomat and travel writer.

== Early life ==
Brummell was educated at St Albans School before reading geography at St Catharine's College, Cambridge. He entered the Foreign and Commonwealth Office in 1987.

== Career ==
After stints in Pakistan and Italy, interspersed with jobs in Whitehall, Brummell received his first posting as head of a diplomatic mission in 2002, as Ambassador to Turkmenistan. In 2005, he made the relatively short move to head the embassy in Kazakhstan, a position that also includes being non-resident ambassador to Kyrgyzstan. That same year his name was among a list of individuals claimed to be serving members of the Secret Intelligence Service that appeared on the US website Cryptome.

In 2008 he invited the US ambassador, Tatiana Gfoeller, to a meeting with the Duke of York and British businessmen; her report to Washington, leaked by WikiLeaks and reported by British and international media, mentioned indiscreet remarks by the Duke.

In 2009 Brummell was transferred to Bridgetown, Barbados, where he served as High Commissioner to Barbados and the Eastern Caribbean (Antigua and Barbuda, Dominica, Grenada, St Kitts and Nevis, St Lucia, and St Vincent and the Grenadines) until 2013, and was also UK representative to CARICOM and the OECS.

Following this, Brummell served as Ambassador to Romania from 2014 to 2018.

He then held the position of Head of Soft Power and External Affairs Department within the Communication Directorate of the Foreign and Commonwealth Office.

In July 2021, he succeeded Keith Shannon as Ambassador to Latvia, serving until July 2025 when he was succeeded by Kathy Leach.

== Honours ==
Brummell was appointed Companion of the Order of St Michael and St George (CMG) in the 2016 Birthday Honours for services to foreign policy.

== Publications ==
- Turkmenistan, Bradt Travel Guides, 2005. ISBN 978-1-84162-144-9
- Kazakhstan, Bradt Travel Guides, 2008. ISBN 978-1-84162-369-6

Diplomatic posts
Preceded by Fraser Wilson	British Ambassador to Turkmenistan; 2002–2005	Succeeded by Peter Butcher
Preceded by James Lyall Sharp	British Ambassador to Kazakhstan and Kyrgyzstan; 2005–2009	Succeeded by David Moran
Preceded by Duncan Taylor	British High Commissioner to Barbados and other Caribbean countries 2010–2013	Succeeded by Victoria Dean
Preceded by Martin Harris	British Ambassador to Romania; 2014–2018	Succeeded by Andrew Noble
Preceded by Keith Shannon	British Ambassador to Latvia; 2021–2025	Succeeded by Kathy Leach
