= List of ambassadors of the United Kingdom to Latvia =

The ambassador of the United Kingdom to Latvia is the United Kingdom's foremost diplomatic representative in Latvia, and head of the UK's diplomatic mission in Riga.

== Heads of mission ==
=== Envoys extraordinary and ministers plenipotentiary ===
From 1921 to 1940, British ministers were accredited to Estonia and Lithuania as well as Latvia; they were based in Riga.

- 1921–1922: Ernest Wilton
- 1922–1927: Sir Tudor Vaughan
- 1928–1930: Joseph Addison
- 1931–1934: Hughe Knatchbull-Hugessen
- 1934–1937: Sir Edmund Monson, 3rd Baronet
- 1937–1940: Sir Charles Orde

No representation 1940–91. Latvia was incorporated into the Soviet Union in 1940, and regained its independence in 1991.

=== Ambassadors ===
- 1991–1993: Richard Samuel
- 1993–1995: Richard Ralph
- 1996–1999: Nicholas Jarrold
- 1999–2002: Stephen Nash
- 2002–2005: Andrew Tesoriere
- 2005–2007: Ian Bond
- 2007–2009: Richard Moon
- 2010–2013: Andrew Soper
- 2013–2017: Sarah Cowley
- 2017–2021: Keith Shannon
- 2021–2025 Paul Brummell
- 2025–present: Kathy Leach
