= Penny Tranter =

British weather forecaster

Penny Tranter was a BBC Weather weather forecaster from 1992 to 2008.

== Biography ==
Tranter was born in Kilwinning, Ayrshire, Scotland. Her interest in weather started after living through the Great Glasgow Storm of 1968. A few years later, after a family move to England, her interest intensified and, after attending South Wilts Grammar School in Salisbury, graduated from the University of East Anglia in 1982 with a degree in Environmental Sciences.

She joined the Met Office in 1983 as a graduate trainee weather forecaster. Tranter worked as a forecaster across the UK at the Norwich, Glasgow and Southampton Weather Centres before joining the Commercial division in 1990. In 1992 Tranter joined the team at the BBC Weather Centre, as a broadcast meteorologist, making her first television appearance on 7 November of that year. She appeared regularly on BBC One, BBC Two, BBC News 24, BBC World, BBC Radio 2, BBC Radio 4 and BBC Radio 5 Live.

Tranter was also involved with Children in Need over three years with fellow BBC weather presenters dancing the 'Can Can', 'It's Raining Men' and 'The Time Warp' from the Rocky Horror Show. As part of a BBC Weather Centre team, she also enjoyed running half marathons, completing several Great North Runs, until her knees 'said no more'.

Tranter left the BBC Weather Centre in January 2008 to become the Meteorology Training Manager at the Met Office College in Exeter, where she worked until 2011. While in the role, she oversaw an expansion of the College, leading to an increase in both student numbers and weather and climate change training,

Tranter is now a Met Office Advisor working with emergency responders and planners, specialising in severe weather. She is based in SW England, and remembers vividly the severe winter of 2013/14, when she worked closely with the emergency community involved in the response and recovery of the Somerset Levels flooding.

Sailing is a lifelong hobby, and during London 2012 she was able to combine this passion with her weather forecasting skills. Tranter was a member of the successful Met Office forecasting team for the sailing events in Weymouth for the Olympics and Paralympics. Since then, Tranter has presented the weather brief for the 2015 and 2017 Fastnet Races to the competing yachtsmen and yachtswomen taking part in this iconic sailing challenge.

Tranter is a Chartered Meteorologist, member of the Royal Meteorological Society and a STEM (Science, Technology, Engineering, Maths) ambassador for the Met Office. She often gives talks and presentations on weather, specialising in sailing weather and weather forecasting.
