= James Tait (historian) =

English medieval historian (1863–1944)

Professor James Tait FBA
- Born: 19 June 1863; Broughton, Salford, Lancashire
- Died: 4 July 1944 (aged 81); Manchester, Lancashire

Academic background
- Education: Owens College, Manchester; Balliol College, Oxford
- Academic advisor: Arthur Lionel Smith

Academic work
- Era: Middle Ages
- Discipline: History
- Sub-discipline: Medieval History
- Institutions: Owens College, Manchester

James Tait (19 June 1863 – 4 July 1944) was an English medieval historian. With Thomas Frederick Tout, he was the second major figure in the "Manchester School of History".

== Life ==
Tait was born in Broughton, Salford, on 19 June 1863, the son of Robert Ramsay Tait, a seed merchant, and his wife Annie Case. He entered Owens College, Manchester, aged 16, and in 1883 graduated there, in history, the institution having meanwhile become part of the federal Victoria University, with other colleges in Leeds and Liverpool. He then studied at Balliol College, Oxford under Arthur Lionel Smith, and obtained a first class degree in 1887. Whilst at Oxford, he was a member of the exclusive Stubbs Society.

Appointed Assistant Lecturer at Manchester in 1887, Tait became lecturer in Ancient History in 1896. He served as Professor of Ancient and Medieval History, from 1902 to 1919. He was elected a Fellow of the British Academy in 1921.

Tait was noted for his retiring, scholarly life, in Fallowfield and then in Wilmslow. He died unmarried, in Wilmslow, on 4 July 1944.

== Works ==
Tait's major works were Mediaeval Manchester and the Beginnings of Lancashire (1904), the first volume of the history series of Manchester University Press and a standard work for the rest of the century, and The Medieval English Borough (1936).

Tait published on local history, with contributions to the Victoria County History of Lancashire, and he also edited The Domesday Survey of Cheshire (1916).

Tait was a Member of the Chetham Society, serving as Member of Council (1901–44) and President (1915–25). He contributed several works which were published by the Society.

== Notes ==
Professional and academic associations
Preceded by Adolphus William Ward	President of the Chetham Society; 1915–25	Succeeded by John William Robinson Parker
