= Laurie Bristow =

British diplomat (born 1963)

Sir Laurie Bristow KCMG
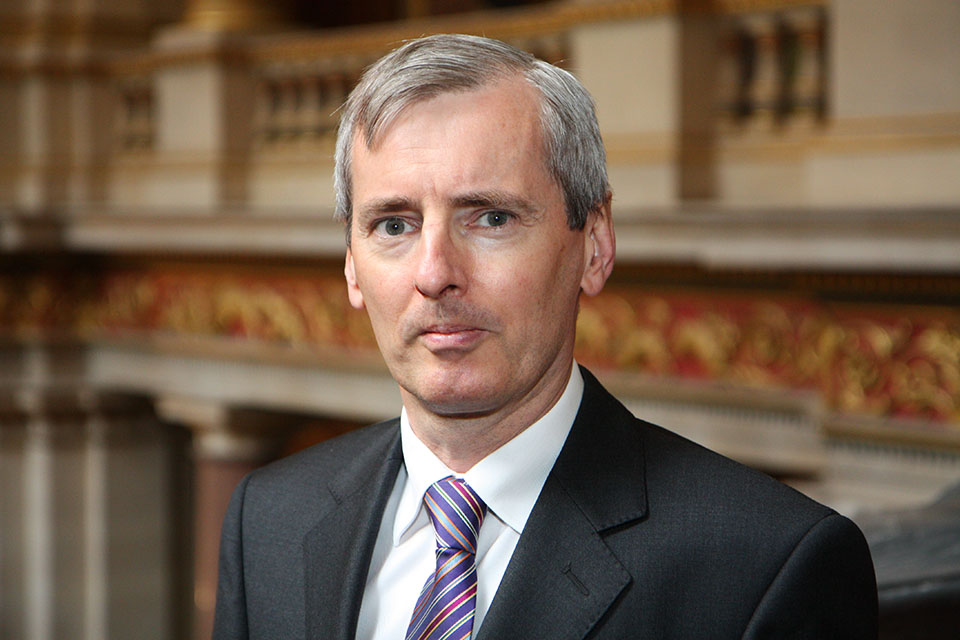

British Ambassador to Afghanistan
- In office June 2021 – November 2021
- Monarch: Elizabeth II
- Prime Minister: Boris Johnson
- Preceded by: Alison Blake
- Succeeded by: Martin Longden (chargé d'affaires)

British Ambassador to Russia
- In office January 2016 – January 2020
- Monarch: Elizabeth II
- Prime Minister: David Cameron; Theresa May; Boris Johnson
- Preceded by: Sir Tim Barrow
- Succeeded by: Deborah Bronnert

British Ambassador to Azerbaijan
- In office 18 February 2004 – 2007
- Monarch: Elizabeth II
- Prime Minister: Tony Blair
- Preceded by: Andy Tucker
- Succeeded by: Carolyn Browne

Personal details
- Born: 23 November 1963 (age 62)
- Spouse(s): Fiona, Lady Bristow
- Children: 2
- Education: Colchester Royal Grammar School
- Alma mater: Trinity College, Cambridge (BA); University of Cambridge (PhD); The Open University (MBA)
- Occupation: Diplomat

Sir Laurence Stanley Charles Bristow KCMG (born 23 November 1963) is a British diplomat who served as British Ambassador to Afghanistan between June and November 2021, notably during the fall of Kabul. He served as British Ambassador to Azerbaijan from 2004 to 2007 and British Ambassador to Russia from 2016 to 2020. He is now President of Hughes Hall, Cambridge.

== Education ==
Bristow was educated at Colchester Royal Grammar School, and Trinity College, Cambridge, where he graduated with a BA in 1986. He received a PhD in English literature from the University of Cambridge in 1990, with a thesis called "Ezra Pound: Poetry and Public Speaking". He also gained an MBA in 2001 from The Open University.

== Career ==
Bristow joined the Foreign and Commonwealth Office (FCO) in 1990. In the winter of early 1992, after attending a year of Romanian language training in the UK, he was posted to Bucharest, Romania, where he worked for three years as second secretary. He then returned to the FCO in London, where he worked in the European Union department. From 1996 to 1998, he served as private secretary to the Minister of State for Europe. After a year of Turkish language training, he worked in Ankara, Turkey as head of the political section from 1999 to 2002. From 2002 to 2003, he worked in Rome at the NATO Defence College. In 2003 he worked on the Iraq policy unit at the FCO.

Bristow was British Ambassador to Azerbaijan from 18 February 2004 to 2007. He was minister (deputy head of mission) in Moscow from 2007 to 2010. He then returned to London as Director, Eastern Europe and Central Asia, from 2010 until 2012. He subsequently replaced Thomas Drew as Director, Intelligence and National Security. In 2015, he was succeeded by Jonathan Allen and appointed to be Ambassador to Russia, a role he served in from January 2016. In response to the poisoning of British spy Sergei Skripal, he had "difficult conversations" with the Russian government about deterrence. His tenure ended in January 2020, and he was succeeded by Deborah Bronnert. In March 2020 he was appointed Regional Ambassador for COP26 - China, Eastern Europe, Central Asia, Middle East, North Africa, jointly at the Foreign and Commonwealth Office and the Cabinet Office.

Bristow succeeded Alison Blake as Ambassador to Afghanistan in June 2021. As Kabul fell to the Taliban on 15 August 2021 and people attempted to flee Afghanistan, Bristow remained at Kabul's airport, personally processing visa applications of British and Afghan nationals. Bristow flew back to the UK on 29 August, announcing that the Embassy would operate from Qatar "for the time being".

In October 2022, Bristow became President of Hughes Hall, a postgraduate college of the University of Cambridge.

== Honours ==
Bristow was appointed Companion of the Order of St Michael and St George (CMG) "for services to British foreign policy interests and national security" in the 2015 New Year Honours and promoted as Knight Commander of the Order of St Michael and St George (KCMG) in the 2019 New Year Honours.

== Personal life ==
Bristow is married to Fiona and has two sons.

== Books ==
Bristow's memoir, Kabul: Final Call, recounting the evacuation from Afghanistan during the fall of Kabul, was published in April 2024.

Diplomatic posts
Preceded by Andy Tucker	British Ambassador to Azerbaijan; 2004–2007	Succeeded by Carolyn Browne
Preceded by Sir Tim Barrow	British Ambassador to Russia; 2016–2020	Succeeded by Deborah Bronnert
Preceded by Alison Blake	British Ambassador to Afghanistan; 2021	Succeeded by Martin Longden as chargé d'affaires
