= Jasmine Dotiwala =

British broadcaster, producer, and columnist

Jasmine Dotiwala OBE
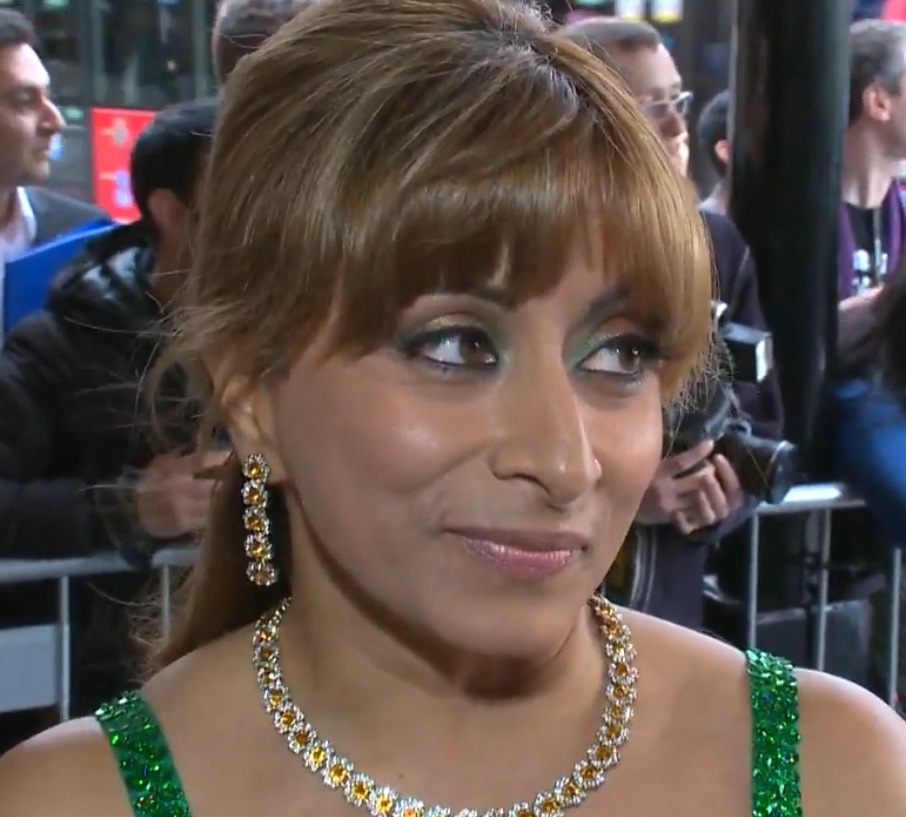
- Dotiwala at the 4th Asian Awards, 2014
- Born: England
- Occupations: Broadcaster, producer, columnist
- Website: jasminedotiwala.co.uk

Jasmine Dotiwala is a British broadcaster, producer, and columnist. Dotiwala has worked with television and radio news platforms such as MTV, Channel 4 and BBC Radio London. She has written and blogged for publications including Huffington Post UK and The Voice.

== Early life ==
Jasmine Dotiwala grew up in Southall, West London, where she attended Featherstone High School. She participated in the performing arts through her childhood; she began dance training when she was seven years old and started to teach dance by fifteen. After earning eight O-Levels, she read dance and drama at Surrey University and graduated in 1992.

== Career ==
Dotiwala was first employed by production company Planet 24, which worked on the morning show The Big Breakfast, until she successfully auditioned for co-host of the Channel 4 programme The Word in 1994. After she co-hosted The Word for several years, she moved to MTV Europe where she was a presenter for MTV News, before becoming senior producer of shows including Making the Video and MTV Cribs. In 2006, she became head of MTV Base, where she interviewed artists such as Jay-Z and Eminem. The Guardian included her into its list of the 30 most important ethnic minorities in media in the following year. In 2009, she returned to Channel 4, where she worked on music programmes such as twentieth anniversary special for The Word. She moved to the BBC in 2011 to work in their Children's Development team, before moving to the BBC TV Music department where she worked on developing youth music content.

The Source magazine in 2016 described Dotiwala as "one of hip hop culture's most important voices". She was a judge for the 2018 iteration of BBC's Woman's Hour Power List, which recognises women working in the music industry. In April 2018, Dotiwala was requested to give evidence at the House of Commons to MP's for the Youth Violence Commission. Later that year, she was announced as a presenter for the weekly BBC Radio London radio show The Scene. Dotiwala was called to give evidence to peers of the House of Lords in May 2019 around the subject of the future of public service broadcasters in the era of streaming services. She was later named to the judging panel for the 2019 Namibian Annual Music Awards.

In 2020, Dotiwala joined Netflix UK. She was appointed an Officer of the Order of the British Empire (OBE) in the 2025 New Year Honours for services to Broadcasting, to Music and to Equality, Diversity and Inclusion.
