= Embassy of the United Kingdom, Pyongyang =

Embassy in Pyongyang, North Korea

The British Embassy Pyongyang
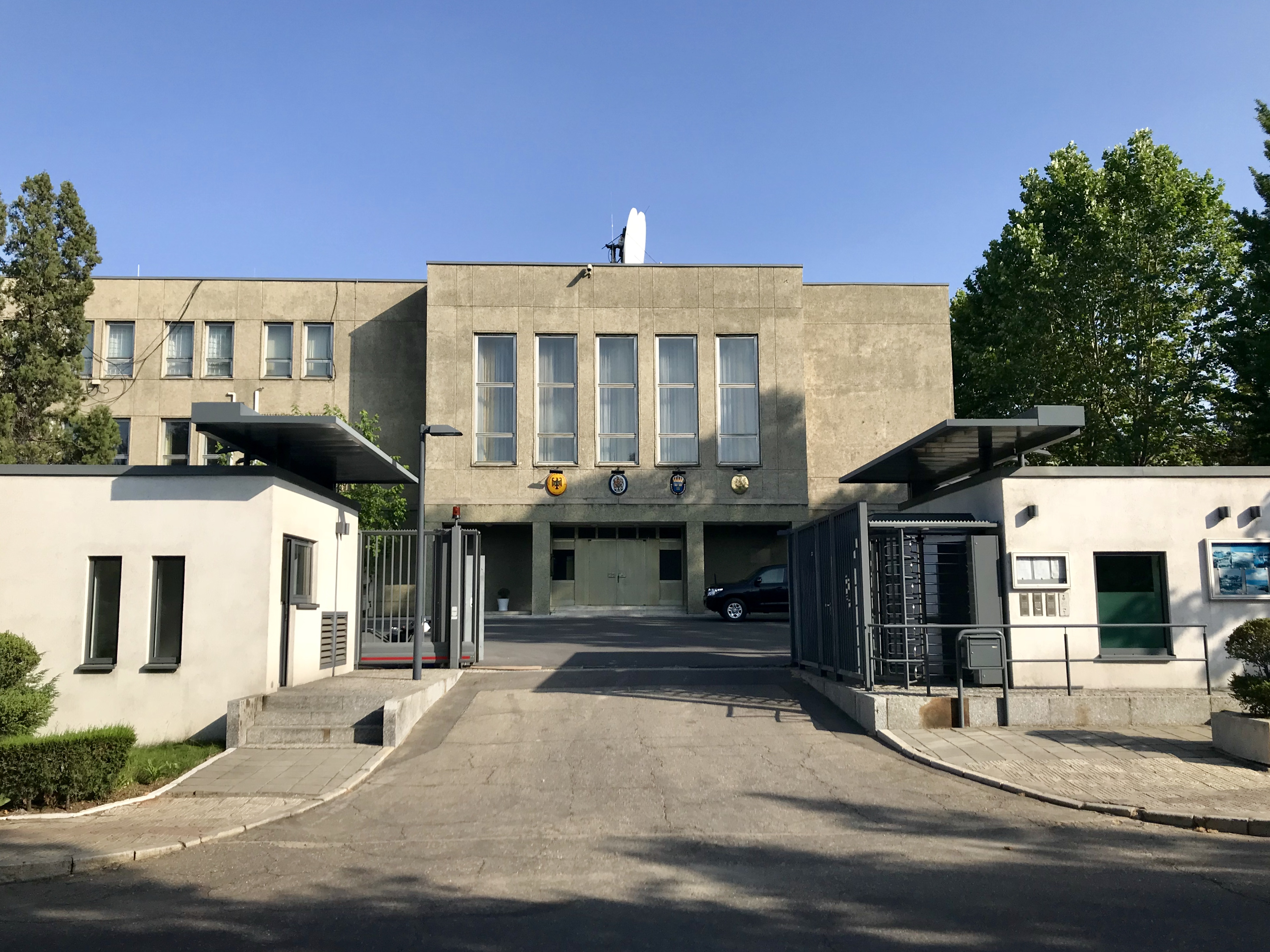
- The chancery that houses the British, German, French and Swedish embassies in Pyongyang
- Location: Pyongyang, North Korea
- Address: Munsu-dong Compound
- Coordinates: 39.0225°N 125.7940°E
- Ambassador: Simon Wood

The British Embassy Pyongyang is the British sovereign's diplomatic mission in Pyongyang, North Korea, that represents the United Kingdom's interests. It is located in the Munsu-dong diplomatic compound (in the Taedonggang District), where most of the diplomatic missions to North Korea are located, with the exception of the Russian and Chinese missions.

It shares a building with the German, French and Swedish missions to North Korea, in what was originally the East German mission and was transferred to the government of the present Germany upon German reunification. The former East German embassy was established at a time when North Korea relied almost exclusively on the Comecon countries, along with China, for external trade.

In May 2020, the embassy was closed due to the COVID-19 pandemic. As of 2026, it remains closed.

== History ==
The UK and North Korea had no formal diplomatic relations until 12 December 2000, when diplomatic missions in London and Pyongyang were established. James Hoare was chargé d'affaires from 2001–02 until a permanent ambassador was appointed by the UK Government: the first full-time accredited British diplomat was James Warren. The embassy itself opened in July 2001 and the first ambassador, David Slinn, arrived in North Korea in November 2002.

On 5 April 2013, the North Korean government advised the British Embassy, and all other missions, that the safety of their missions could not be assured past 10 April 2013. This was part of the North Korean government's response to United Nations Security Council Resolution 2094 and deterioration of relations between North Korea and the United States.

In May 2020, the embassy was closed due to the COVID-19 pandemic and has been closed since. Some other countries had their diplomats evacuated earlier in March. In February 2024, NK News reported that the UK was in negotiations with North Korea about re-opening its embassy. However, as of 2026, the embassy remains closed, with Ambassador Simon Wood yet to take his post in North Korea.

== See also ==
- List of ambassadors of the United Kingdom to North Korea
- List of diplomatic missions in North Korea
  - Embassy of Sweden, Pyongyang
- Foreign relations of North Korea
