= James Hoare =

British scholar of East Asia (born 1943)

James Edward Hoare OBE (born 1943) is a British academic and historian specialising in Korean and Chinese studies, and a career diplomat in the British Foreign Office.

== Academia ==
Hoare is a graduate of London's School of Oriental and African Studies (SOAS). He has long been a member of the Anglo-Korean Society, the Korean Branch of the Royal Asiatic Society, and the Royal Society for Asian Affairs.

In 2006, Hoare was President of the British Association of Korean Studies (BAKS).

== Foreign service ==
After Britain and North Korea re-established diplomatic relations in 2000, Hoare was appointed British Chargé d'affaires in Pyongyang; and his work laid the foundation for the establishment of a full embassy in the North Korean capital.

Previously, Hoare had been head of the Foreign Office's North Asia and Pacific Research Group. He joined the Foreign and Commonwealth Office in 1969 and was stationed in Seoul in 1981-1984 and in Beijing in 1988–1991.

Hoare was awarded an OBE in the 2025 New Year Honours for "services to UK interests in the Korean Peninsula".

== Selected work ==
In a statistical overview derived from writings by and about James Hoare, OCLC/WorldCat encompasses roughly 30+ works in 60+ publications in 3 languages and 4,000+ library holdings.

Books

- 2018 - Culture, Power and Politics in Treaty-Port Japan 1854-1899 ISBN 978-1-898823-61-2 (cloth)
- 2015 - Historical Dictionary of the Republic of Korea ISBN 978-0810849495
- 2013 - Critical Readings on North and South Korea ISBN 978-9004208766 (cloth)
- 2012 - Historical Dictionary of Democratic People's Republic of Korea ISBN 978-0810861510
- 2005 - A Political and Economic Dictionary of East Asia ISBN 978-1857432589
- 2007 - Korea: The Past and Present with Susan Pares. London: Global Oriental. ISBN 978-1-901903-54-6 (cloth)
- 1999 - Britain and Japan: Biographical Portraits, Vol. III. London: RoutledgeCurzon. ISBN 978-1-873410-89-9 (cloth)
- 1999 - Embassies in the East: The Story of the British and their Embassies in China, Japan and Korea from 1859 to the Present. London: Curzon. ISBN 0-7007-0512-0
- 1999 -- Korea: a Historical and Cultural Dictionary with Richard Rutt. London: Routledge. ISBN 978-0-7007-0464-4
- 1994 - Japan's Treaty Ports and Foreign Settlements: The Uninvited Guests 1858-1899. London: Curzon. ISBN 1-873410-26-3
- 1994 - Nish, Ian and James E. Hoare, eds. Britain & Japan: Biographical Portraits, Vol. II. London: RoutledgeCurzon. ISBN 1-873410-62-X
- 1988 - James Hoare & Susan Pares. Korea: An Introduction. Keegan Paul International. https://books.google.com/books/about/Korea.html?id=_zoOAAAAQAAJ.

Periodicals

- 1994 - "Building Politics: the British Embassy Peking, 1949-1992," in The Pacific Review, Vol. 7.

== See also ==
- List of Ambassadors from the United Kingdom to North Korea
- Global Oriental
