= List of ambassadors of the United Kingdom to Azerbaijan =

The ambassador of the United Kingdom to Azerbaijan is the United Kingdom's foremost diplomatic representative in the Republic of Azerbaijan, and head of the UK's diplomatic mission in Baku.

After the collapse of the Soviet Union, the United Kingdom recognised the independence of Azerbaijan in December 1991. Diplomatic relations were re-established in March 1992 and the then British ambassador to Russia, Sir Brian Fall, was also accredited to Azerbaijan until the first resident ambassador arrived in 1993.

== Ambassadors ==
- 1992–1993: Sir Brian Fall (non-resident)
- 1993–1997: Thomas Young
- 1997–2000: Roger Thomas
- 2000–2003: Andrew Tucker
- 2004–2007: Laurie Bristow
- 2007–2011: Carolyn Browne
- 2011–2013: Peter Bateman
- 2013–2016: Irfan Siddiq
- 2016–2019: Carole Crofts
- 2019–2022: James Lyall Sharp
- 2022–2026: Fergus Auld
- 2026–present: Duncan Norman
