= John Everard (diplomat) =

British diplomat

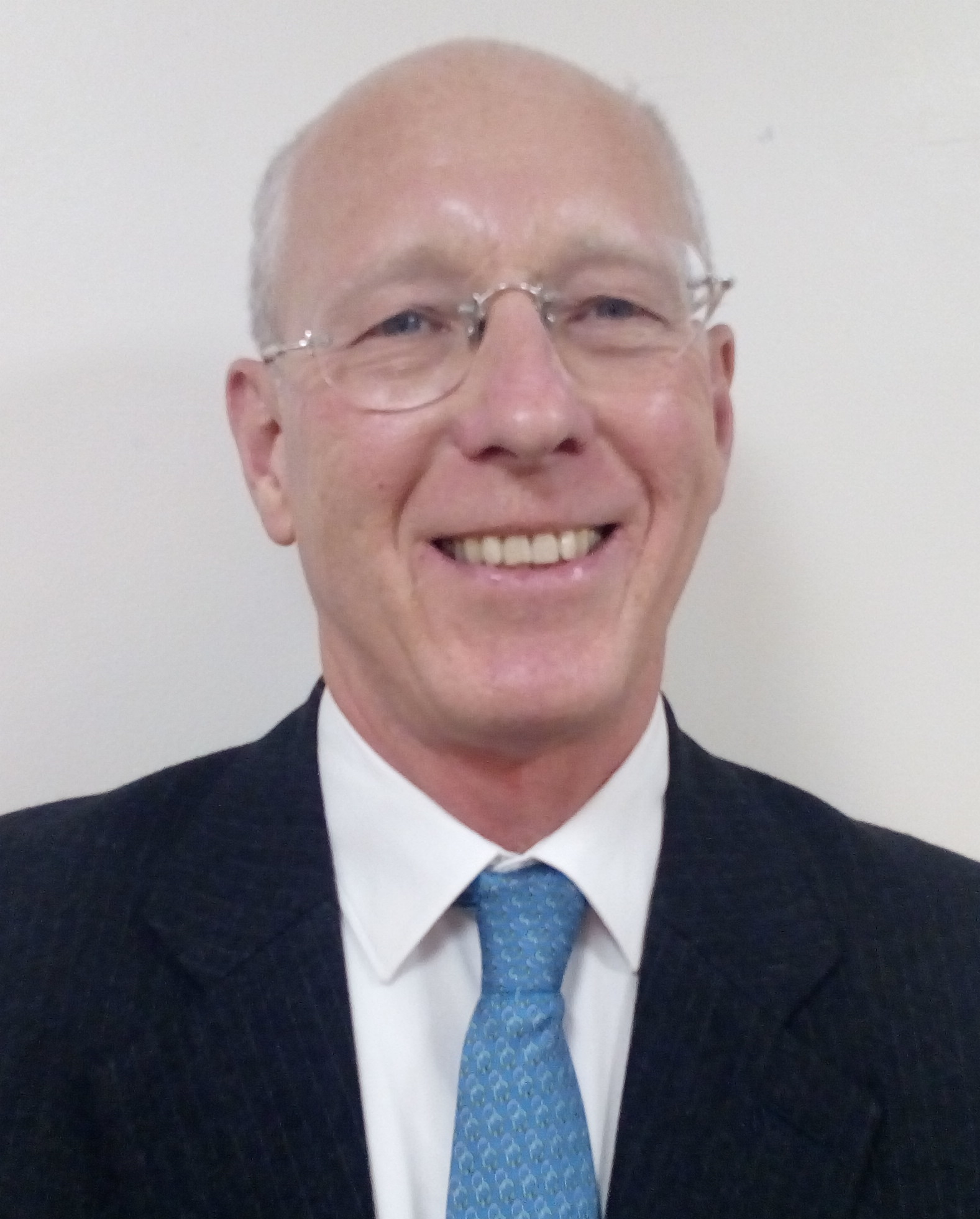
- Everard in December 2019

Co-ordinator of the UN Security Council's Panel of Experts on sanctions on North Korea
- In office April 2011 – November 2012
- Governor: Ban Ki-moon

London School of Economics Visiting Senior Fellow, Asia Research Centre
- In office September 2010 – June 2012

Pantech Fellow, Shorenstein Asia Pacific Research Center at Stanford University, California
- In office September 2010 – June 2011

Trustee of the London Cycling Campaign
- In office July 2009 – October 2010

Trustee of the Youth Hostel Association
- In office June 2009 – July 2010

Ambassador of the United Kingdom to North Korea
- In office February 2006 – July 2008
- Monarch: Elizabeth II
- Prime Minister: Tony Blair; Gordon Brown

Ambassador of the United Kingdom to Uruguay
- In office September 2001 – April 2005
- Monarch: Elizabeth II
- Prime Minister: Tony Blair

Head of the Political Section at the UK's embassy in Beijing
- In office May 1998 – October 2000
- Monarch: Elizabeth II
- Prime Minister: Tony Blair

Ambassador of the United Kingdom to Belarus
- In office May 1993 – December 1995
- Monarch: Elizabeth II
- Prime Minister: John Major

Personal details
- Born: 24 November 1956 (age 69) Newcastle upon Tyne, United Kingdom
- Spouse: Heather Starkey (m. 1990)
- Relations: William Ralph Everard (father)
- John Everard's voice recorded in December 2019

John Vivian Everard (born 24 November 1956) is a British former diplomat. He was formerly the UK's ambassador to Belarus, the UK's ambassador to Uruguay and the UK's ambassador to North Korea from 2006 to 2008, after which he was the holder of the Pantech fellowship at the Shorenstein Asia–Pacific Research Center at Stanford University in 2010 and 2011.

== Early life and education ==
Born in Newcastle upon Tyne to William Ralph Everard and Margaret Nora Jennifer Everard (née Massey), Everard holds BA and MA degrees in Chinese from Emmanuel College at Cambridge University, and a diploma in economics from Beijing University. Everard also earned an MBA from Manchester Business School.

== Career ==
Everard was appointed the coordinator of the United Nations Panel of Experts on sanctions against North Korea established by United Nations Security Council Resolution 1874 in March 2011 and withdrew from that position in November 2012.

== Personal life ==
Everard is proficient in Chinese, Spanish, German, Russian and French. Everard is a cyclist. He was a trustee of the Youth Hostels Association of England and Wales from 2009 to 2010.

Everard married Heather Ann Starkey in 1990; they live in London.

== Books ==
- Only Beautiful, Please: A British Diplomat in North Korea, Asia–Pacific Research Center, 18 June 2012. ISBN 1931368252
