= Featherstone High School =

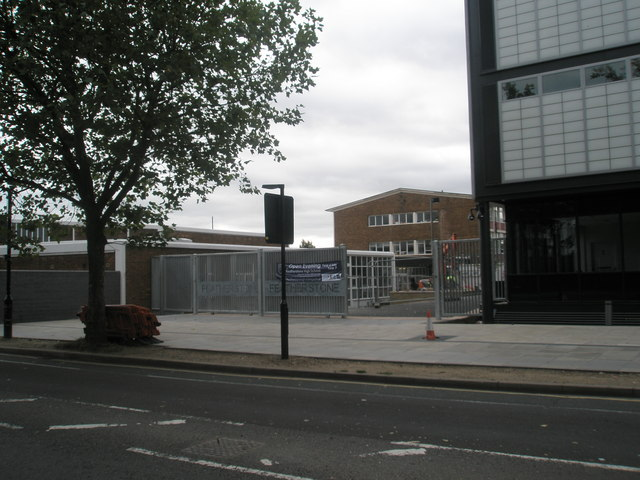

Location
- Montague Waye; Southall, Greater London, UB2 5HF; England
- Coordinates: 51°29′57″N 0°23′14″W

Information
- Type: Academy
- Department for Education URN: 137729 Tables
- Ofsted: Reports
- Headteacher: Nathan Walters
- Gender: Coeducational
- Age: 11 to 18
- Enrolment: 1679
- Houses: Liberty; Equality; Inspire; Unity; Honour
- Colours: Black, Red and Blue
- MAT Website: https://www.featherstonehigh.ealing.sch.uk/gumat/
- Website: www.featherstonehigh.ealing.sch.uk

Featherstone High School is a coeducational secondary school and sixth form with academy status, located in the Southall area of the London Borough of Ealing, England.

The school converted to academy status in February 2012, and was previously a community school under the direct control of Ealing London Borough Council. The school continues to coordinate with Ealing London Borough Council for admissions.

Featherstone High School offers GCSEs and BTECs as programmes of study for pupils, while sixth form students can choose to study from range of A Levels and additional BTECs.

Notable former pupils include the broadcaster Jasmine Dotiwala OBE.
