= Sally Axworthy =

British diplomat (born 1964)

Her Excellency Sally Axworthy MBE
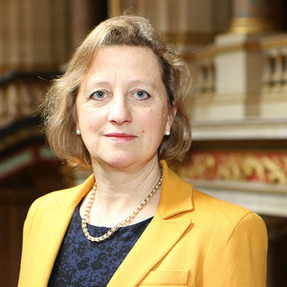

British Ambassador to Kazakhstan
- Incumbent
- Assumed office 2025
- Monarch: Charles III
- Prime Minister: Keir Starmer; Andy Burnham
- Preceded by: Kathy Leach

British Ambassador to the Holy See
- In office 19 September 2016 – July 2021
- Monarch: Elizabeth II
- Prime Minister: Theresa May; Boris Johnson
- Preceded by: Nigel Baker
- Succeeded by: Chris Trott

Personal details
- Born: 1 September 1964 (age 61)
- Spouse: Michael Axworthy (m. 1996; died 2019)
- Children: 4
- Occupation: Diplomat

Sally Jane Axworthy, MBE (née Hinds, 1 September 1964) is a British diplomat who was formerly the British Ambassador to the Holy See. Since August 2025, Axworthy serves as the British Ambassador in Astana.

== Life ==
Axworthy is the widow of Michael Axworthy, whom she married in 1996 and who died in March 2019, and has four children. She graduated in with a degree in modern history from Oxford University, with a specialisation in economics and law.

She joined the Foreign Office in 1986. In 1987, she was a Desk Officer covering Hungary and what was then Czechoslovakia. From 1988 until 1989, she spent a year learning Russian in preparation for her posting to Moscow in 1989 as a Third Secretary, Commercial. She remained in Moscow until 1991 when she was transferred to Kiev as a Second Secretary, Economic.

From 1993 to 1994, Axworthy returned to London as Head of the Political Section in the UN Directorate. After this, until 1996 she was seconded to the German Foreign Ministry returning to the FCO but remaining in Germany in Berlin as First Secretary. For two years from 1998 she was head of the Turkey, Cyprus & Malta Section before being posted to Government Office South West as assistant director.

From 2011 to 2015, she returned to London where she worked in the FCO on African affairs, starting in the Great Lakes team, then the Somalia unit, and finally as joint head of the North Africa department.

On 19 September 2016, Axworthy presented her letter of credence to Pope Francis, beginning her mission to the Holy See. She ended her mission in July 2021.

Returning to London, Axworthy served in London on international peace negotiations work. She was appointed as British Ambassador to Kazakhstan to succeed Kathy Leach in 2025.

Diplomatic posts
Preceded by Nigel Baker	British Ambassador to the Holy See; 2016–2021	Succeeded by Christopher Trott
