= Catriona Laing =

British diplomat

Her Excellency Catriona Laing CB
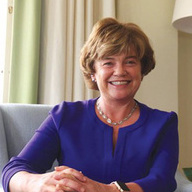

British High Commissioner to Nigeria
- In office 2018–2023
- Monarchs: Elizabeth II; Charles III
- Prime Minister: Theresa May; Boris Johnson; Liz Truss; Rishi Sunak
- Preceded by: Paul Arkwright

British Ambassador to Zimbabwe
- In office 2014–2018
- Monarch: Elizabeth II
- Prime Minister: David Cameron; Theresa May
- Preceded by: Deborah Bronnert
- Succeeded by: Melanie Robinson

Personal details
- Born: Catriona Wendy Campbell Laing
- Education: London School of Economics (MSc)

Catriona Wendy Campbell Laing CB is a British civil servant and diplomat who has been serving as United Nations Secretary-General António Guterres' Special Representative for Somalia and Head of the United Nations Assistance Mission in Somalia (UNSOM) since 2023.

== Early life and education ==
Laing studied economics at the London School of Economics, graduating with a Master of Science (MSc) degree in 1986. She later attended the Cranfield School of Management at Cranfield University, and completed a Master of Business Administration (MBA) in 1996.

== Career ==
After graduating, Laing worked as an ODI Fellow for the Botswana Ministry of Works. She then joined the Overseas Development Administration, which was then an agency of the Foreign and Commonwealth Office (FCO). She was seconded to be head of the development office of the UN Mission in Somalia 1993–94. She studied at Cranfield School of Management 1995–96 for an MBA degree. She continued with the Overseas Development Administration when it became part of the Department for International Development (DFID) in 1997. She was seconded to the Cabinet Office as deputy director of the Prime Minister's strategy unit 2001–05, then was head of DFID's International Division Advisory Department 2005–06, head of DFID in Sudan 2006–09, and director, human rights and international, at the Ministry of Justice 2009–12. She then joined the FCO and was the UK's senior civilian representative to the NATO operation in southern Afghanistan 2012–13.

Laing was appointed to be Ambassador to Zimbabwe from 2014. After four years in that post she was appointed to be High Commissioner to Nigeria from November 2018.

Laing was appointed CB in the 2012 New Year Honours.
