= Charles Lonsdale =

British diplomat

Charles John Lonsdale (born 5 July 1965) is a British diplomat who was Ambassador to Armenia 2008–2012. He is the son of author and scholar Roger Lonsdale

Lonsdale was Second Secretary in Budapest, Hungary from 1990 to 1993, and First Secretary in Moscow, Russia from 1998 to 2000.

At the Foreign & Commonwealth Office in London, UK, Lonsdale was Deputy Head of the Afghanistan Group from 2003 to 2005, and then Deputy Head of the Human Rights, Democracy and Governance Group.

After leaving Armenia, Lonsdale was briefly Chargé d'Affaires at the British Embassy in Dushanbe, Tajikistan.

He speaks French, Russian, Hungarian and Armenian.

Diplomatic posts
Preceded by Anthony Cantor	Ambassador to Armenia; 2008–2012	Succeeded by Jonathan Aves and Katherine Leach
