= David Slinn =

British diplomat

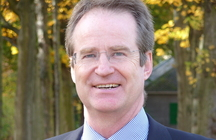
David Slinn

David Arthur Slinn CMG OBE (born 16 April 1959 in Northampton, England) is a retired British diplomat. He was Chargé d'Affaires to Albania in 1995 to 1996. Slinn was the first British ambassador to North Korea. Slinn was head of the Helmand Provincial Reconstruction Team between 2007 and 2008. He was appointed ambassador to Croatia in 2012 and retired from the Diplomatic Service in 2015. He also held posts in Geneva, Ulan Bator, Pretoria, Tirana, Belgrade, and Pristina.
