= List of ambassadors of the United Kingdom to Armenia =

The ambassador of the United Kingdom to Armenia is the United Kingdom's foremost diplomatic representative in Armenia, and head of the UK's diplomatic mission in Yerevan. The official title is His Britannic Majesty's Ambassador to the Republic of Armenia.

The UK recognised Armenia on 31 December 1991, and diplomatic relations were established on 20 January 1992 when the then ambassador to Russia, Sir Brian Fall, was also accredited to Armenia. The British Embassy in Yerevan was opened in July 1995.

== Ambassadors to Armenia ==
- 1992–1995: Sir Brian Fall (non-resident)
- 1995–1997: David Miller
- 1997–1999: John Mitchiner
- 1999–2002: Timothy Marschall Jones
- 2003–2005: Thorhilda Abbott-Watt
- 2006–2008: Anthony Cantor
- 2008–2012: Charles Lonsdale
- 2012–2014: Jonathan Aves and Katherine Leach (joint appointment, alternating on a 4-monthly basis)
- 2014–2015: Katherine Leach
- 2015–2020: Judith Farnworth
- 2020–2025: John Gallagher
- 2025–present: Alexandra Cole
