= 1948 New Year Honours =

British royal recognitions

The 1948 New Year Honours were appointments by many of the Commonwealth realms of King George VI to various orders and honours to reward and highlight good works by citizens of those countries. They were announced on 1 January 1948 for the British Empire and New Zealand to celebrate the past year and mark the beginning of 1948.

This was the last honours list to include appointments to The Most Exalted Order of the Star of India and the Order of the Indian Empire.

The recipients of honours are displayed here as they were styled before their new honour, and arranged by honour, with classes (Knight, Knight Grand Cross, etc.) and then divisions (Military, Civil, etc.) as appropriate.

== British Empire ==
=== Viscount ===
- The Right Honourable John Scott, Baron Hyndley, GBE, chairman, National Coal Board. Lately Controller-General, Ministry of Fuel and Power, and chairman, Finance Corporation for Industry Ltd.

=== Baron ===
- Sir Valentine George Crittall, JP. For political and public services.
- Marshal of the Royal Air Force Sir (William) Sholto Douglas, GCB, MC, DFC, Commander-in-Chief and Military Governor, Germany, 1946–1947.
- Sir Harold Vincent Mackintosh, Bt., JP, DL, chairman, National Savings Committee.
- Colonel the Right Honourable Sir (David) John Colville, GCIE, TD, Governor of Bombay, 1943–1947 (dated 14 August 1947).

=== Privy Counsellor ===
- George Buchanan, MP, Minister of Pensions. Joint Parliamentary Under-Secretary of State for Scotland, 1945–1947. Member of Parliament for the Gorbals Division of Glasgow since 1922.
- David Kirkwood, JP, MP, Member of Parliament for Dumbarton Burghs since 1922. For political and public services.
- The Honourable William John McKell, KC, Governor-General of the Commonwealth of Australia.
- The Honourable Sir Malcolm Macnaghten, KBE, lately Judge of the High Court of Justice.
- George Heaton Nicholls, High Commissioner for the Union of South Africa in London, 1944–1947.
- The Honourable Sir Humphrey Francis O'Leary, KCMG, Chief Justice of New Zealand.

=== Knight Bachelor ===
- Richard Harold Armstrong, LLD, Chairman of the Royal Liverpool United Hospital.
- Michael Elias Balcon, Director and Production Head of Ealing Studios Ltd.
- Frederic Charles Bartlett, CBE, FRS, Professor of Experimental Psychology, University of Cambridge.
- Leslie Cecil Blackmore Bowker, OBE, MC, City Remembrancer.
- Colonel Eric Gore Browne, DSO, OBE, TD, ADC, chairman, Southern Railway Company.
- George Chester, CBE, General Secretary, National Union of Boot and Shoe Operatives.
- Harold Claughton, CBE, MA, Principal of the University of London.
- John Douglas Cockcroft, CBE, PhD, LLD, MSc, MIEE, FRS, Director, Atomic Energy Research Establishment, Ministry of Supply.
- Commander Geoffrey Edgar Duveen, VRD, Royal Naval Volunteer Reserve (Retired), Chairman of the Royal Ear Hospital, London.
- His Honour Tom Eastham, KC, Senior Official Referee, Supreme Court of Judicature.
- Robert George Erskine, CBE, deputy chairman, Navy Army and Air Force Institutes.
- Vincent Ziani de Ferranti, MC, chairman and managing director, Ferranti Ltd.
- Robert Macdonald Gould, CB, Chief Industrial Commissioner, Ministry of Labour and National Service.
- Philip Buhner Johnson, President, Engineering and Allied Employers' National Federation.
- Edward Redmayne Redmayne-Jones, lately Chairman of the National Federation of Corn Trade Associations.
- Ralph Wilfred Lacey, Cotton Controller, Board of Trade.
- John Loudon, Director of Bacon and Ham, Ministry of Food.
- James Gow Mann, FSA, Director of the Wallace Collection.
- John Parkinson, MD, FRCP, Physician to the Cardiac Department, London Hospital.
- George Lionel Pepler, CB. For services to town and country planning.
- Harry Platt, MD, MS, FRCS, Professor of Orthopaedic Surgery, University of Manchester.
- Charles Garonne Renold, JP, chairman, British Institute of Management.
- Harry Ralph Ricardo, LLD, FRS, chairman and Technical Director, Ricardo & Co. Ltd.
- William Dunkeld Robieson, LLD, JP, Editor of The Glasgow Herald.
- Herbert Septimus Scott, CMG. For services to education in Africa.
- Richard Vynne Southwell, FRS, Rector of the Imperial College of Science and Technology, University of London.
- Professor Frank Merry Stenton, DLitt, LittD, FBA, President of the Royal Historical Society.
- John Walker Stephenson, CBE, JP, General Secretary, Plumbers', Glaziers' and Domestic Engineers' Union.
- Philip Crawford Vickery, CIE, OBE, Civil Assistant, War Office.

Dominions

- Francis Raymond Connelly, Lord Mayor of the City of Melbourne, State of Victoria.
- The Honourable Frank Ernest Gibson, a Member of the Legislative Council, State of Western Australia. For public and municipal services.
- The Honourable Charles John Lowe, Judge of the Supreme Court, and Chancellor of the University of Melbourne, State of Victoria.
- Ernest Augustus Lee Steere, a pastoralist, State of Western Australia. For public services.

Burma

- Ronald Nesbitt-Hawes, CBE, Director-General, Posts and Telegraphs, Burma.
- Charles Frederick Byrde Pearce, CBE, Indian Civil Service, Auditor-General, Burma.

Colonies, Protectorates, Etc.

- Hussein Hassanal Abdool Cader, CBE. For public services in the Malayan Union.
- Tsibu Darku IXth, OBE, Omanhene of Asin Atandasu. For public services in the Gold Coast.
- William Ivor Jennings, LittD, LLD, Vice-Chancellor, University of Ceylon.
- John Harry Barclay Nihill, MC, Colonial Legal Service, Chief Justice, Kenya.
- Professor Luigi Preziosi, MD, President of the National Assembly, Malta.

India (dated 14 August 1947)

- Albert Roderick Chisholm, managing director, Imperial Bank of India.
- Charles Beaupre Bell Clee, CSI, CIE, Indian Civil Service, Revenue Commissioner for Sind and Secretary to the Government of Sind in the Revenue Department.
- Colonel David Clyde, CIE, MD, VHS, Indian Medical Service, Surgeon-General with the Government of Bengal.
- Hugh Douglas Cumberbatch, Chairman of the Directors, Messrs. Andrew Yule & Co. Ltd., Calcutta, Bengal.
- Norman Frederick Frome, CIE, DFC, MIEE, Chief Engineer, Posts and Telegraphs.
- Harry Greenfield, CSI, CIE, chairman, Central Board of Revenue.
- Lancelot Cecil Lepel Griffin, CSI, CIE, Indian Political Service, Secretary to His Excellency the Crown Representative.
- Wilfred Vernon Grigson, CSI, Indian Civil Service, Revenue Minister, Hyderabad State.
- Mr. Justice Arthur Comyn Happell, Indian Civil Service, Puisne Judge of the High Court of Judicature at Fort St. George, Madras.
- Francis Herbert du Heaume, CIE, OBE, Indian Police, Deputy Inspector of Police, Training and Technical, Punjab.
- Mr. Justice Lionel Clifford Horwill, Indian Civil Service, Puisne Judge of the High Court of Judicature at Fort St. George, Madras.
- John Wardle Houlton, CSI, CIE, Indian Civil Service, Member, Board of Revenue, Bihar.
- Arthur Cecil Inskip, CBE, General Manager, Messrs. Cooper Allen & Co., Cawnpore.
- William Norman Prentice Jenkin, CSI, CIE, Indian Police, Deputy Inspector-General of Police, Criminal Investigation Department, Punjab.
- Mr. Justice Ronald Francis Lodge, Indian Civil Service, Puisne Judge of the High Court of Judicature at Fort William in Bengal.
- Christopher Hughes Masterman, CSI, CIE, Indian Civil Service, Member, Board of Revenue, Madras.
- Mr. Justice Herbert Ribton Meredith, Indian Civil Service Puisne Judge of the High Court of Judicature at Patna.
- Charles Watt Miles, OBE, Senior Partner, Messrs. Shaw Wallace & Co., Calcutta.
- Samuel Harrison Yardley Oulsnam, CSI, CIE, MC, Indian Civil Service, Secretary to the Government of India, Department of Health.
- Charles Ridley Pawsey, CSI, CIE, MC, Deputy Commissioner, Naga Hills, Kohima, Assam.
- George Alfred Pearce, OBE, Indian Police, Inspector-General of Police, United Provinces.
- Emil Athol Owen Perkin, CIE, chairman, Joint Public Service Commission of Bihar, the Central Provinces and Berar, and Orissa.
- Major-General George de la Poer Beresford, CB, MC, Controller of Salvage, General Headquarters, India.
- Geoffrey Charles Frescheville Ramsden, CIE, Indian Civil Service, Financial Commissioner (officiating), Central Provinces and Berar.
- William Robert Tennant, CIE, Indian Civil Service, Deputy Auditor-General of India.
- Joseph Herbert Thompson, CIE, Indian Political Service, Resident on Special Duty in the Political Department Secretariat, India.
- Herbert John Todd, CIE, Indian Political Service, lately Resident for the Eastern States.
- Hugh Weightman, CSI, CIE, Indian Civil Service, Secretary to the Government of India in the Department of External Affairs and Commonwealth Relations.
- Bernard James Whitby, JP, ACA, RA, Senior Partner, Messrs. A. F. Ferguson & Co., Chartered Accountants, Bombay.

=== Order of the Bath ===
==== Knight Grand Cross of the Order of the Bath (GCB) ====
Military Division

- Admiral Sir Edward Neville Syfret, KCB, KBE.
- General Sir Montagu George North Stopford, KCB, KBE, DSO, MC, ADC (Gen.), (4554), late Infantry.

Civil Division

- Sir Thomas James Barnes, KCB, CBE, HM Procurator General and Treasury Solicitor.

==== Knight Commander of the Order of the Bath (KCB) ====
Military Division

- Lieutenant-General Reginald Alexander Dallas Brooks, CB, CMG, DSO, Royal Marines.
- Vice-Admiral Charles Saumarez Daniel, CB, CBE, DSO.
- Lieutenant-General Kenneth Noel Crawford, CB, MC, (10226), late Corps of Royal Engineers.
- Air Vice-Marshal Leslie Oswald Brown, CB, CBE, DSC, AFC, Royal Air Force.

Civil Division

- Lieutenant-Colonel (Brevet Colonel) William Henry Wiggin, CB, DSO, TD, chairman, Territorial and Auxiliary Forces Association, for the County of Worcestershire.
- Sir James Horace Barnes, KBE, Permanent Under-Secretary of State, Air Ministry.
- Sir (Thomas) Gilmour Jenkins, KBE, CB, MC, Secretary, Ministry of Transport.
- Sir Thomas Herbert Sheepshanks, KBE, CB, Permanent Secretary, Ministry of Town and Country Planning.

==== Companion of the Order of the Bath (CB) ====
Military Division

Royal Navy

- Rear-Admiral Arthur Robin Moore Bridge, CBE.
- Rear-Admiral Harold Hickling, CBE, DSO.
- Major-General Hubert Thomas Newman, CBE, Royal Marines.
- Surgeon Rear-Admiral Joseph Aloysius O'Flynn, MD, BCh, DTM&H, KHP.
- Rear-Admiral Robert Don Oliver, CBE, DSC.
- Rear-Admiral The Honourable Guy Herbrand Edward Russell, CBE, DSO.
- Rear-Admiral (E) Brian Leonard Geoffrey Sebastian.
- Rear-Admiral Arthur Guy Norris Wyatt.

Army

- Major-General (temporary) (now Colonel) Stanley Arnott, CBE, DSO, MD, (4215), late Royal Army Medical Corps.
- Major-General Rupert Tristram Oliver Cary, CBE, DSO, (16265), late Royal Corps of Signals.
- Major-General (acting) Kenneth Chisholm Davidson, MC, (13184), late Infantry.
- Brigadier (temporary) Arthur Julian Hadfield Dove, CBE, (14522), late Corps of Royal Engineers.
- Major-General (temporary) Oliver Pearce Edgcumbe, CBE, MC, (12450), late Royal Corps of Signals.
- Major-General Edward Temple Leigh Gurdon, CBE, MC, (8822), late Infantry.
- Major-General Joseph Charles Haydon, DSO, OBE, (13865), late Foot Guards.
- Brigadier (temporary) John Lingham, DSO, MC, (13513), late Infantry.
- Major-General Cyril Lloyd, CBE, TD, (44586), Royal Artillery, Territorial Army.
- Major-General (temporary) Geoffrey Woodroffe Palmer, CBE, (11379), Royal Army Ordnance Corps.
- Major-General (temporary) Fendall William Harvey Pratt, CBE, DSO, MC, ADC, (8073), late Royal Regiment of Artillery.
- Major-General John Dee Shapland, DSO, MC, (11416), late Royal Regiment of Artillery.
- Major-General (temporary) William Donovan Stamer, CBE, DSO, MC, (4225), late Infantry.
- Major-General (temporary) Lechmere Cay Thomas, CBE, DSO, MC, (12601), late Infantry.

India (dated 14 August 1947)

- Colonel (Temporary Major-General) John Steventon Ballentine, CIE, Indian Army, Royal Deccan Horse.
- Colonel (Temporary Brigadier) Roderick Idrisyn Jones, CBE, Royal Indian Army Service Corps.
- Colonel (Temporary Major-General) Walter David Alexander Lentaigne, CBE, DSO, 4th Gurkha Rifles.
- Colonel (Temporary Major-General) Osmond de Turville Lovett, CBE, DSO, 2nd Gurkha Rifles.
- Colonel (Temporary Major-General) Claude Ernest Pert, DSO, Probyn's Horse, Indian Army.
- Colonel (Temporary Major-General) Frank Hollamby Skinner, CIE, OBE, The Kumaon Regiment, Indian Army.
- Colonel (Temporary Major-General) Hugh Huntingdon Stable, CIE, Indian Army, late Cavalry.
- Colonel (Temporary Brigadier) Edward William Drummond Vaughan, DSO, MC, Indian Army, late Cavalry.

Royal Air Force

- Air Vice-Marshal Harold Thomas Lydford, CBE, AFC.
- Air Vice-Marshal Geoffrey Arthur Henzell Pidcock, CBE.
- Air Vice-Marshal William Edward Theak, CBE.
- Acting Air Vice-Marshal Thomas Cathcart Traill, OBE, DFC.
- Air Commodore Philip Clermont Livingston, CBE, AFC, FRCS, FRCS(E), LRCP, DPH, DOMS.
- Acting Air Commodore Cyril Douglas Adams, OBE.

Civil Division

- Lieutenant-Colonel (Brevet Colonel) John Peter Grant, MC, TD, chairman, Territorial and Auxiliary Forces Association for the County of Inverness.
- Colonel the Right Honourable Wentworth Henry Canning, Viscount Allendale, CBE, MC, chairman, Territorial and Auxiliary Forces Association, for the County of Northumberland.
- John Allan, FBA, FSA, Keeper of Coins and Medals, British Museum.
- Ben Lewis Barnett, MC, Director of Inland Telecommunications, General Post Office.
- Arthur Fitzroy Dobbie-Bateman, Under-Secretary, Ministry of Supply.
- George Macdonald Bennett, ScD, PhD, Government Chemist.
- Henry Clifford Care, Director of Finance, War Office.
- Pierson John Dixon, CMG, lately Principal Private Secretary to the Secretary of State for Foreign Affairs, HM Ambassador, designate, to Czechoslovakia.
- Edward John Rogers Edwards, Under-Secretary, Ministry of Works.
- Lionel Wray Fox, MC, Chairman of the Prison Commission.
- Edwin Alan Hitchman, Under-Secretary, Ministry of Labour and National Service.
- John Jardine, OBE, MD, FRCS (Ed.), chairman, General Board of Control for Scotland.
- Lachlan Frederick Copeland Maclean, OBE, Under-Secretary, Ministry of Food.
- George Matthew McNaughton, MICE, MIMechE, Chief Engineer, Ministry of Health.
- Arthur Richard Manktelow, Under-Secretary, Ministry of Agriculture and Fisheries.
- Edward Max Nicholson, Under-Secretary, Office of the Lord President of the Council.
- Frederick Joseph Orchin, OBE, Under-Secretary, Ministry of Transport.
- Cyril Albert Richardson, Chief Inspector, Ministry of Education.
- John Roughton Simpson, Under-Secretary, HM Treasury.
- Edgar William Verity, Commissioner of Inland Revenue.

=== Order of Merit (OM) ===
- Thomas Stearns Eliot, LLD.

=== Order of the Star of India ===
These were the last appointments to the Order of the Star of India. They were made "as on the 14th August, 1947" – the last day of the Indian Empire. India gained independence as the Dominion of India on 15 August 1947.

==== Knight Grand Commander of the Order of the Star of India (GCSI) ====
- His Excellency Lieutenant-General Sir Archibald Edward Nye, GCIE, KCB, KBE, MC, Governor of Madras.
- His Excellency Sir Frederick John Burrows, GCIE, Governor of Bengal.
- Major His Highness Maharaja Sir Shahaji Chhatrapati, KCSI, ADC, Maharaja of Kolhapur.
- Lieutenant-General His Highness Saramad-i-Rajaha-i-Hindustan Raj Rajindra Sri Maharajadhiraja Sawar Sir Man Singhji Bahadur, GCIE, Maharaja of Jaipur.
- Lieutenant-General His Highness Maharajadhiraja Raj Rajeshwar Shiromani Shri Sir Sadul Singhji Bahadur, GCIE, CVO, Maharajah of Bikaner.

==== Knight Commander of the Order of the Star of India (KCSI) ====
- Colonel His Highness Maharao Bhim Singhji Bahadur, Maharao of Kotah.
- Sir David Taylor Monteath, KCB, KCMG, CVO, OBE, lately His Majesty's Under-Secretary of State for India.
- Vice-Admiral Sir Geoffrey John Audley Miles, KCB, Royal Navy, Commander-in-Chief, Royal Indian Navy.
- Major-General (Local Lieutenant-General) Treffry Owen Thompson, CB, CBE, KHP, Director of Medical Services, India.
- Sir John Thorne Masey Bennett, CIE, CBE, MC, Indian Police, Inspector-General of Police, Punjab.

==== Companion of the Order of the Star of India (CSI) ====
- Lawrence Arthur Bishop, OBE, Inspector-General of Police, Madras.
- John Bowstead, CIE, MC, Indian Civil Service, Chief Secretary to the Government of Bihar.
- Philip George Braye, CIE, Indian Civil Service, Financial Commissioner (officiating), Central Provinces and Berar.
- Captain (S) Ronald Vernon Brockman, CIE, CBE, Royal Navy, Personal Secretary to His Excellency the Viceroy.
- Clarence James Creed, CIE, OBE, MC, Indian Police, Inspector-General of Police, Bihar.
- Lieutenant-Colonel Gerald Charles Lawrence Crichton, CIE, Indian Political Service, Secretary to the Government of India in the Department of External Affairs and Commonwealth Relations (officiating).
- Walter Henry John Christie, CIE, OBE, Indian Civil Service, Joint Private Secretary to His Excellency the Viceroy.
- Thomas Arthur Wyness Foy, CIE, Indian Service of Engineers, Chief Engineer and Secretary to the Government of the Punjab in the Irrigation Department.
- William Telford Hall, CIE, Indian Forest Service, Chief Conservator of Forests, United Provinces.
- Joseph Boyd Irwin, CIE, DSO, MC, Indian Civil Service, lately Chairman Post-War Pay Committee and ex-officio Additional Secretary to the Government of India in the Defence Department.
- Austen Havelock Layard, CIE, Indian Civil Service, lately Secretary to His Excellency the Governor of the Central Provinces and Berar.
- Colonel (Temporary Major-General) James Balfour Macdonald, DSO, OBE, Deputy Adjutant-General (I) and Director of Organisation, General Headquarters, India.
- Lieutenant-Colonel George Leslie Mallam, CIE, Barrister-at-Law, Indian Political Service, Revenue and Divisional Commissioner, North-West Frontier Province.
- Colonel (Temporary Major-General) Francis Malcolm Moore, CIE, Military Adviser-in-Chief, Indian States Forces.
- David Symington, CIE, Indian Civil Service, Secretary to His Excellency the Governor of Bombay.
- Rao Shri Hamirsinhji Hindusinhji, Rao of Vijaynagar State.
- Daintry Douglas Warren, CIE, MC, Indian Civil Service, Secretary to the Government of India in the Transport Department.

=== Order of Saint Michael and Saint George ===
==== Knight Grand Cross of the Order of St Michael and St George (GCMG) ====
- Sir (Crawfurd) Wilfrid Griffin Eady, KCB, KBE, CMG, Second Secretary, His Majesty's Treasury.
- Major-General Sir Hubert Elvin Rance, GBE, CB, Governor of Burma.
- The Right Honourable Alfred Duff Cooper, DSO, lately His Majesty's Ambassador Extraordinary and Plenipotentiary at Paris.
- Sir Oliver Charles Harvey, KCMG, CB, His Majesty's Ambassador Extraordinary and Plenipotentiary (designate) to the French Republic.

==== Knight Commander of the Order of St Michael and St George (KCMG) ====
- Henry Stanley Gregory, CB, Head of the Trading with the Enemy Department and Administrator of Enemy Property, Board of Trade.
- Sir (John) Gilbert Laithwaite, KCIE, CSI, Deputy Under-Secretary of State, Burma Office.
- David John Lidbury, CB, CMG, DSO, Vice-chairman of the Executive Commission of the Universal Postal Union.
- Walter Crossfield Hankinson, CMG, OBE, MC, High Commissioner designate in Ceylon for His Majesty's Government in the United Kingdom.
- Sir Charles Nobel Arden Clarke, CMG, Governor and Commander in Chief, Sarawak.
- Sir Oliver Ernest Goonetilleke, KBE, CMG, Financial Secretary, Ceylon.
- Edward Gerald Hawkesworth, CMG, MC, Governor and Commander-in-Chief, British Honduras.
- Andrew Barkworth Wright, CMG, CBE, MC, Governor and Commander-in-Chief, Gambia.
- Alvary Douglas Frederick Gascoigne, CMG, United Kingdom Political Representative in Japan.
- Ivone Augustine Kirkpatrick, CMG, an Assistant Under-Secretary of State in the Foreign Office.
- George Gordon Medlicott Vereker, CMG, MC, His Majesty's Ambassador Extraordinary and Plenipotentiary at Montevideo.

Honorary Knight Commander

- His Highness Tunku Badlishah ibni Sultan Abdul Hamid Halimshah, KBE, CMG, The Sultan of Kedah, Malayan Union.

==== Companion of the Order of St Michael and St George (CMG) ====
- Vernon Gordon Fitzell Bovenizer. For services as Director of Organisation, Control Commission for Germany (British Element).
- Ludovic James Dunnett, Assistant Secretary, Ministry of Civil Aviation.
- Harry Cecil Jones, lately Ministry of Transport Finance Officer, New York.
- Ernest Muir, CIE, MD, FRCS, Honorary Medical Adviser to the British Empire Leprosy Relief Association.
- Rowland Hubert Owen, Senior Trade Commissioner for the United Kingdom in India.
- William Rowson Richardson, Principal Assistant Secretary, Ministry of Education.
- Robert Ely McGuire, OBE, Indian Civil Service, Secretary to His Excellency the Governor of Burma.
- John Chrysostom Barnabas Wakeford, Chief Railway Commissioner, Burma Railways.
- Ben Cockram, OBE, an Assistant Secretary in the Commonwealth Relations Office, at present serving in His Majesty's Embassy at Washington.
- James Edgar Heritage. For public services in the State of Tasmania.
- Claude Hamilton Brazel, MC, Chief Engineer and Manager, Department of Government Electrical Undertakings, Ceylon.
- James Calder, Colonial Administrative Service, Chief Secretary, North Borneo.
- Andrew Benjamin Cohen, OBE, Assistant Under-Secretary, Colonial Office.
- George Conrad Green, MBE, Colonial Administrative Service, Administrator of Grenada, Windward Islands.
- Andrew Park Mitchell, Director of Land Surveys, Palestine.
- Roger Edward Norton, OBE, Commissioner, East Africa Office, London.
- Wheatley Alexander Robertson, Forestry Adviser, Colonial Office.
- Alfred William Langley Savage, Colonial Administrative Service, Deputy Financial Secretary, Nigeria.
- Stafford William Powell Foster-Sutton, OBE, Colonial Legal Service, Member for Law and Order and Attorney-General, Kenya.
- George Edwin Thornton, MBE, Financial Secretary, Northern Rhodesia.
- Edward Rex Ward, Colonial Administrative Service, Colonial Secretary, Gambia.
- Wilfrid Arthur Ward, MC, Colonial Administrative Service, Resident Commissioner, Selangor, Malayan Union.
- Douglas Laird Busk, Counsellor in His Majesty's Embassy at Bagdad.
- William McCallum Clyde, MA, PhD, employed on the staff of the Special Commissioner in South-East Asia.
- Brigadier John Gordon Deedes, OBE, lately Telecommunications Attaché at His Majesty's Embassy in Washington.
- William Louis Martial Dunlop, OBE, until recently Head of the Communications Department of the Foreign Office.
- John Dee Greenway, His Majesty's Envoy Extraordinary and Minister Plenipotentiary at Panama.
- William Goodenough Hayter, Head of the Services Liaison Department of the Foreign Office.
- Derwent William Kermode, His Majesty's Consul-General at Seoul.
- Lionel Henry Lamb, OBE, Minister in His Majesty's Embassy at Nanking.
- Henry Cecil Sumner Maine, MVO, attached to a Department of the Foreign Office.
- Alan Charles Trott, OBE, His Majesty's Ambassador Extraordinary and Plenipotentiary at Jedda.

Honorary Companion

- His Highness Ismail ibni Al-Marhum Sultan Zainal Abidin, The Sultan of Terengganu, Malayan Union.

=== Order of the Indian Empire ===
These were the last appointments to the Order of the Indian Empire. They were made "as on the 14th August, 1947" – the last day of the Indian Empire. India gained independence as the Dominion of India on 15 August 1947.

==== Knight Grand Commander of the Order of the Indian Empire (GCIE) ====
- His Excellency Sir Francis Verner Wylie, KCSI, CIE, Indian Civil Service, Governor of the United Provinces.
- His Excellency Sir Evan Meredith Jenkins, KCSI, KCIE, Indian Civil Service, Governor of the Punjab.
- His Excellency Sir Hugh Dow, KCSI, CIE, Indian Civil Service, Governor of Bihar.
- His Highness Rai-i-Rayan Maharawal Sri Sir Lakshman Singhji Bahadur, KCSI, Maharawal of Dungarpur.
- Sir Eric Charles Miéville, KCIE, KCVO, CSI, CMG, Principal Secretary to His Excellency the Viceroy.
- Sir Maurice Linford Gwyer, KCB, KCIE, Vice-Chancellor, Delhi University.

==== Knight Commander of the Order of the Indian Empire (KCIE) ====
- His Highness Maharaja Yeshwant Rao Bhau Saheb Puar, Maharaja of Dewas (Junior Branch).
- His Highness Maharaja Shri Mayurdhwaj-Sinhji, Maharaja Raj Saheb of Dhrangadhra.
- His Highness Raja Dileep Singh, Raja of Jhabua.
- The Honourable Charles Gordon Herbert, CSI, CIE, Indian Political Service, Resident at Hyderabad.
- Air Marshal Hugh Sydney Porter Walmsley, CB, CBE, MC, DFC, Air Officer Commanding-in-Chief in India and Deputy Supreme Commander (Air).
- Major-General (Temporary Lieutenant-General) Harold Rawdon Briggs, CB, CBE, DSO, Indian Army, General Officer Commanding-in-Chief, Burma Command.
- Major-General (Temporary Lieutenant-General) Douglas David Gracey, CB, CBE, MC, General Officer Commanding, 1st Indian Corps.
- William Christie, CSI, CIE, MC, Indian Civil Service, Chief Commissioner, Delhi.
- Ambrose Dundas Flux Dundas, CSI, CIE, Indian Civil Service, Secretary to the Government of India in the Defence Department.
- William Scott Brown, CSI, CIE, Indian Civil Service, Chief Secretary to the Government of Madras.
- Sir Ivon Hope Taunton, CIE, Indian Civil Service, Chief Secretary to the Government of Bombay.
- Major-General Robert Hay, CIE, MB, Indian Medical Service, Director-General, Indian Medical Service.
- John Dawson Tyson, CSI, CBE, Indian Civil Service, Secretary to His Excellency the Governor of Bengal.
- John Rowlatt, CB, MC, Office of the Parliamentary Counsel, London.

==== Companion of the Order of the Indian Empire (CIE) ====
- Brigadier Robert Denis Ambrose, OBE, MC, Indian Army, Inspector-General and Secretary, Frontier Corps, North-West Frontier.
- Major-General Allan Cholmondeley Arnold, CBE, MC, Regional Food Commissioner, North-Western Region, Department of Food, Government of India.
- Lieutenant-Colonel Edward Malcolm Ashton, OBE, Director, Military Lands and Cantonments, India.
- Colonel (Temporary Brigadier) Donald Rowland Edwin Rowan Bateman, DSO, OBE, lately Commander, Wana Frontier Brigade Group.
- Neil Brodie, Partner, Messrs. Gladstone Wyllie & Co., Calcutta, Bengal.
- Joseph Charles Brommage, OBE, Military Accountant-General, India.
- Oscar Henry Brown, OBE, Chief Presidency Magistrate, Bombay.
- Colonel Humphry Bullock, OBE, Judge Advocate-General in India.
- Albert Edward Caffin, OBE, Indian Police, Commissioner of Police, Bombay.
- Alan Campbell-Johnson, OBE, Press Attaché to His Excellency the Viceroy.
- Hadden Hamilton Carleston, OBE, Indian Civil Service, Collector and District Magistrate, Madras.
- Lieutenant-Colonel Alfred Innes Cox, OBE, Indian Medical Service, District Medical Officer, The Nilgiris, and Superintendent, Government Headquarters Hospital, Ootacamund, Madras.
- Major Donald Victor Deane, OBE, Mint Master, Bombay.
- Colonel (Temporary Brigadier) James Gordon Elliott, Deputy Secretary to the Government of India in the Cabinet Secretariat.
- Lieutenant-Colonel Vernon Forbes Erskine-Crum, MC, Conference Secretary to His Excellency the Viceroy.
- Edward Arthur Rawlins Eustace, OBE, Indian Civil Service, Commissioner, Ambala Division, Punjab.
- Dundonald Gainsford, Indian Police, Deputy Inspector-General of Police, Jullundur Range, Punjab.
- Lieutenant-Colonel (Temporary Brigadier) John Evison Gordon, OBE, Brigadier in Charge, Administration, United Provinces Area.
- Donald Ross Hardwick, Indian Police, Commissioner of Police, Calcutta, Bengal.
- Reginald John James Hill, Indian Civil Service, Deputy Commissioner, Central Provinces and Berar.
- Lieutenant-Colonel (Temporary Brigadier) Reginald Antony Hutton, DSO, OBE, Controller of Ordnance Services, Headquarters, 1st Corps, India.
- Captain Henry Richmond Inigo-Jones, Acting Commodore, 2nd Class, Royal Indian Navy.
- Darbar Shri Khachar Ala Vajsur, Chief of Jasdan.
- Colonel (Temporary Brigadier) Frank McCallum, OBE, MC, lately Brigadier General Staff, Northern Command.
- George Maurice McKelvie, OBE, Indian Service of Engineers, Consulting Engineer (Roads) to the Government of India.
- Harold Charles Mitchell, Indian Police, Deputy Inspector-General of Police, Headquarters and Railways, United Provinces.
- Paul Robert James Morgan, Indian Police, Commandant, Provincial Additional Police, Punjab.
- William Lee Murrell, OBE, Indian Service of Engineers, Chief Engineer and Secretary to the Government of Bihar in the Public Works Department.
- Herbert John Nichols, Member (Engineering), Railway Board, India.
- Claude Frederick Parry, OBE, Indian Police, Inspector-General of Police, Central Provinces and Berar.
- James Edgar Pearman, OBE, Indian Police, Inspector-General of Police, Orissa.
- John Petty, OBE, MC, Chief Conservator of Forests, Sind.
- Arthur Walter Pryde, OBE, Indian Police, Inspector-General of Police, Sind.
- Hugh Edward Richardson, OBE, Indian Political Service, British Trade Agent, Gyantse, and Officer in Charge of the British Mission, Lhasa, Tibet, Sikkim Agency.
- Reginald Harry Saloway, OBE, Indian Civil Service, Regional Director of Resettlement and Employment, United Provinces.
- Charles Norman Sharples, India Supply Commissioner, London.
- John Burt Shearer, OBE, Indian Civil Service, Joint Secretary to the Government of India in the Finance Department, Central Revenues.
- Colonel Paul Herbert Shelley Smith, OBE, MB, BCh, Indian Medical Service, Inspector-General of Civil Hospitals and Prisons, North-West Frontier Province.
- Lieutenant-Colonel Richard William Spear, OBE, Senior Deputy Director-General, Posts and Telegraphs, India.
- Hugh Southern Stephenson, OBE, Indian Civil Service, District Magistrate, Cawnpore, United Provinces.
- Malcolm Moncrieff Stuart, OBE, Indian Civil Service, Commissioner, Dacca Division, Bengal.
- Humphrey Trevelyan, OBE, Indian Political Service, Joint Secretary to the Government of India in the External Affairs and Commonwealth Relations Department.
- William Hovell Turner, Auditor, Indian Home Accounts, India Office, London.
- William Dixon West, Director, Geological Survey of India.
- Robert Eric Mortimer Wheeler, MC, DLitt, FBA, FSA, Director-General of Archaeology.
- John Stewart Wilcock, OBE, Indian Civil Service, Secretary to the Government of Bihar in the Development and Employment Department.
- Collin Maxwell Wright-Neville, Indian Police, Deputy Inspector-General of Police, Orissa.
- Colonel (Temporary Brigadier) Gordon Drummond Young, OBE, MC, Brigadier Electrical Mechanical Engineering, (Headquarters, Southern Command), India.

=== Royal Victorian Order ===
==== Dame Grand Cross of the Royal Victorian Order (GCVO) ====
- Her Royal Highness The Duchess of Gloucester, CI, GBE.
- Her Royal Highness The Duchess of Kent, CI, GBE.
- Her Royal Highness Princess Alice, Countess of Athlone, GBE.

==== Knight Grand Cross of the Royal Victorian Order (GCVO) ====
- Sir Godfrey John Vignoles Thomas, KCB, KCVO, CSI, Bt.

==== Knight Commander of the Royal Victorian Order (KCVO) ====
- Roland Clive Wallace Burn, CVO.
- The Very Reverend Alan Campbell Don, DD.
- Sir Bracewell Smith, Bt., BSc.

==== Commander of the Royal Victorian Order (CVO) ====
- Colonel Geoffrey Ronald Codrington, CB, DSO, OBE, TD.
- Sydney Humbert Fisher.
- Lieutenant-Colonel William Gibbs, MA.
- Major Philip Reginald Margetson, MC.
- Captain Stephen Hugh Van Neck, MVO, MC.
- The Reverend Jocelyn Henry Temple Perkins, MVO, MA, DCL.
- Captain Hugo Donald Ross, MVO, MC.

==== Member of the Royal Victorian Order (MVO) ====
At this time the two lowest classes of the Royal Victorian Order were "Member (fourth class)" and "Member (fifth class)", both with post-nominal letters MVO. "Member (fourth class)" was renamed "Lieutenant" (LVO) from the 1985 New Year Honours onwards.

Fourth Class

- The Reverend Cyril Moxon Armitage, MA.
- Francis Beaumont, OBE.
- Wladimir Kleinmichel.
- William Neil McKie, MA, DMus, FRCO, ARCM.

Fifth Class

- Lieutenant-Commander Frank Vernon Cook, Royal Navy (Retired).

=== Order of the British Empire ===
==== Dame Grand Cross of the Order of the British Empire (GBE) ====
Civil Division

- Beryl Carnegy, Lady Oliver, DBE, RRC, (Dame Beryl Oliver). For services with the British Red Cross Society.
- Her Excellency the Right Honourable Edwina Cynthia Annette, Countess Mountbatten of Burma, CI, DCVO, CBE, Vicereine of India (dated 14 August 1947).

==== Knight Grand Cross of the Order of the British Empire (GBE) ====
Military Division

- General Sir Alexander Frank Philip Christison, Bt., KBE, CB, DSO, MC, (9487), late Infantry, Colonel, The Duke of Wellington's Regiment (West Riding), and 10th Gurka Rifles, Indian Army.
- Air Chief Marshal Sir Alfred Guy Roland Garrod, KCB, OBE, MC, DFC, LLD, Royal Air Force.

Civil Division

- Sir Edward Mellanby, KCB, MD, ScD, FRCP, FRS, Secretary, Medical Research Council.
- Sir Cyril John Radcliffe, KBE, KC. For services to the British Commonwealth.

==== Dame Commander of the Order of the British Empire (DBE) ====
Military Division

- Matron-in-Chief Louisa Jane Wilkinson, CBE, RRC, (206505), Queen Alexandra's Imperial Military Nursing Service.

==== Knight Commander of the Order of the British Empire (KBE) ====
Military Division

- Rear-Admiral (E) John Leigh Bedale, CB.
- Rear-Admiral Arthur Rullion Rattray, CB, CIE, Royal Indian Navy, Flag Officer, Bombay (dated 14 August 1947).
- Air Vice-Marshal Matthew Brown Frew, CB, DSO, MC, AFC, Royal Air Force.

Civil Division

- Bernard Ottwell Binns, OBE, Indian Civil Service, Financial Commissioner, Burma (Lands and Rural Development).
- Sir Charles Ramsdale Lockhart, CBE, Colonial Administrative Service, Economic Adviser to the East African Governors' Conference.
- James Wilson Robertson, MBE, Civil Secretary, Sudan Government.
- Francis Michie Shepherd, CMG, OBE, His Majesty's Consul-General at Batavia.
- Wilfrid Charles George Cribbett, CMG, Deputy Secretary, Ministry of Civil Aviation.
- Sir John Forster, KC, President of the Industrial Court.
- Herbert John Hutchinson, CB, CBE, lately Second Secretary, Board of Trade (now Secretary, National Coal Board).
- Sir James Colquhoun Irvine, CBE, FRS, JP, DL, Principal and Vice-Chancellor, University of St. Andrews.
- George Henry Maddex, Government Actuary.
- Sir Frank Spencer Spriggs, managing director, Hawker Siddeley Aircraft Co. Ltd.

Dated 14 August 1947

- Lieutenant-Colonel George Arthur Falconer, CIE, Indian Political Service, His Majesty's Minister in Nepal.
- Sir Joseph Aspden Kay, managing director, W. H. Brady & Co. Ltd., Bombay.
- Sir William Patrick Spens, OBE, Chief Justice of India.

==== Commander of the Order of the British Empire (CBE) ====
Military Division

Royal Navy

- Acting Rear-Admiral (S) Edgar Stephen Apps.
- Rear-Admiral (E) George Herbert Hempson Brown, MIMechE.
- Captain Reginald Andrew Jackson, (Retired).
- Surgeon Captain Claude Keating, MSM, LRCP&S.
- Colonel Robert Arthur Ross Neville, ADC, Royal Marines.

Army

- Brigadier (temporary) Roderic Duncan Cameron, OBE, MC, MB, (8711), late Royal Army Medical Corps.
- Brigadier (temporary) and Chief Paymaster Alfred Arthur Cockburn (18730), Royal Army Pay Corps.
- Brigadier (temporary) John Cecil D'Arcy Dalton, OBE, (36501), Royal Regiment of Artillery.
- Colonel (temporary) Nigel Dugdale (41750), 17th/21st Lancers, Royal Armoured Corps.
- Brigadier (temporary) George Charles Humphreys, OBE, (13231), late Infantry.
- Colonel (temporary) William Hall Jackson (52647), The Royal Warwickshire Regiment.
- Brigadier (temporary) Richard William Jelf, OBE, (27927), Royal Regiment of Artillery.
- Brigadier (temporary) James Wolfenden Kenny, OBE, (14473), late Royal Regiment of Artillery.
- Brigadier (temporary) James Newton Rodney Moore, DSO, (32071), Grenadier Guards.
- Colonel (temporary) Alfred Henry Dunlop Phillips, OBE, (10482), Royal Regiment of Artillery.
- Colonel (Honorary Brigadier) Robert Courtenay Prance, DSO, (18185), late Army Cadet Force.
- Controller (temporary) Mary Diana Thorne (192864), Auxiliary Territorial Service.
- Colonel Hugh Kenneth Blaber, Officer Commanding, the Burma Regimental Centre, Burma.

Dated 14 August 1947

- Colonel (Temporary Brigadier) Arthur Victor Douglas Jones, deputy director of Ordnance Services, G.H.Q., India.
- Lieutenant-Colonel (Temporary Brigadier) James Joseph Lambert Mackirdy, Director of Pay and Pensions, G.H.Q., India.
- Colonel Ernest Ross-Magenty, Colonel "A" (Indian Army) G.H.Q., Middle East.
- Colonel Lawrence Monier-Williams, ADC, Secretary to the Principal Staff Officer, India Office.

Royal Air Force

- Air Commodore Leslie John Vernon Bates.
- Air Commodore Arthur Francis Hutton, DFC.
- Acting Air Commodore Robert Henry Seymour Spaight.
- Group Captain John Sullivan.
- Group Captain Frank Wright.
- Acting Group Captain Frederick John Manning.
- Acting Group Captain Deryck Cameron Stapleton, DFC, AFC.

Civil Division

- George Linton Hall Brough, MIEE, deputy director of Electrical Engineering, Admiralty.
- Alderman Thomas William Burden, JP, MP, Second Church Estates Commissioner since 1945, Member of Parliament for the Park Division of Sheffield since 1942. For political and public services.
- Alfred James Camm, MBE, Chief Superintendent of Technical Costings, Ministry of Supply.
- Edmund Graham Clark, MC, MICE, Secretary of the Institution of Civil Engineers.
- Lawrance Arthur Collingwood, lately musical director, Sadler's Wells Theatre.
- Henry Edward Collins, MC, MEng, MIMinE, AMIEE. For services as Director, Production Branch of the Coal Group, Control Commission for Germany (British Element).
- William Frederick Connolly, MBE, Assistant Secretary, Air Ministry.
- Bertie Gibson Crewe, OBE, Assistant Comptroller, Patent Office, Board of Trade.
- William George Crossley, Assistant Secretary, Central Office of Information.
- Stanley Cursiter, OBE, RSA, Director, National Galleries of Scotland.
- Frank Harold Dawson, MC, lately assistant director, Sea Transport Division, Ministry of Transport.
- Wilfred John Dawson, lately Metallurgical Director, Hadfields Ltd., Sheffield.
- Maria Elizabeth Dickin, OBE, Founder and Hon. Director of the People's Dispensary for Sick Animals of the Poor.
- Sir Bedford Lockwood Dorman, Bt., OBE, JP, chairman, North Riding War Agricultural Executive Committee.
- Professor Norman McOmish Dott, MB, FRCS (Ed.) For services as Director in Neurology and Neuro-Surgery, Brain Injuries Unit, Bangour Hospital, Edinburgh.
- Lieutenant-Colonel Albert Edward Evans, MB, BS, Medical Chancery Visitor, Supreme Court of Judicature.
- Ellen Evans, MA, Principal, Glamorgan Teachers' Training College, Barry.
- Lincoln Evans, General Secretary, Iron and Steel Trades Confederation.
- Robert Jaffrey Forbes, Principal, Royal Manchester College of Music.
- Walter Henry Forsdike, lately President of the National Federation of Building Trades Employers.
- George Ridsdale Goldsbrough, DSc, FRS, chairman, University of Durham Joint Recruiting Board.
- William Smith Gordon, PhD, MRCVS, Director, Agricultural Research Council, Field Station, Compton, Berkshire.
- Alderman James Morgan Griffiths, JP, chairman, Pembroke War Agricultural Executive Committee.
- Claude William Guillebaud, Chairman of Wages Councils.
- Major Frank Bernard Halford, FRAeS, Chief Engineer and Director, de Havilland Engine Company, Edgware.
- Edward Alexander Holmes, Deputy Paper Controller, Board of Trade.
- Alfred Edward Hooker, deputy director of Imported Cereals, Ministry of Food.
- Randall Garfield Hosking, chairman, East Midlands Regional Committee, Engineering and Allied Employers' Federation.
- Richard John Humphreys, OBE, Regional Controller, Wales Region, Ministry of Labour and National Service.
- Susan Sutherland Isaacs, DSc, Psychologist to the London Clinic of Psycho-Analysis.
- Howell Ewart James, Chief General Inspector, Ministry of Health.
- William Charles Jones, managing director, W. C. Jones Ltd., Manchester.
- Louis Arnold Jordan, DSc, FRIC, ARCS, MIChemE, Director, Research Association of British Paint, Colour and Varnish Manufacturers.
- Percy Hague Jowett, RWS, Principal of the Royal College of Art.
- John Ernest Kerr, chairman, Stirling and Clackmannan Agricultural Executive Committee.
- William Kerr, PhD, MIMechE, Emeritus Professor of Civil and Mechanical Engineering and Applied Mechanics, Royal Technical College, Glasgow.
- Frank Arthur King, Joint Managing Director, Kelvin & Hughes Ltd.
- Alfred Ernest Kingham, Assistant Secretary, Ministry of Labour and National Service.
- Frank Lambert, FSA, President of the Museums Association, Director of the Walker Art Gallery, Liverpool.
- Archibald Wilfred Lawson, OBE, Chief Operating Officer, Petroleum Board.
- Lieutenant-Colonel George Alfred Lewis, CMG, TD, JP, (Retired), lately Secretary, National Association of Colliery Managers.
- Joseph Frederic Linney, chairman, RAF Pilots' and Crews' Fund Committee of the Auctioneers' and Estate Agents' Institute.
- William Guy Luke, Senior Deputy Director of Stores, Admiralty.
- Alderman Valentine la Touche McEntee, MP, Member of Parliament for Walthamstow West, 1922 and 1923 and since 1929. For political and public services.
- Thomas Bannatyne Marshall, lately County Clerk and Treasurer, Perthshire.
- William Gordon Masefield, MRCS, LRCP, lately Medical Superintendent, Brentwood Mental Hospital, Essex.
- Walter Alfred Medrow, MBE, Assistant Secretary, Admiralty.
- William Alexander Miller, BEM, Chairman of the Housing Committee, Plymouth.
- Alexander Francis Morley, Assistant Secretary, Burma Office.
- George Morton. For services as Chief Accountant, London Midland & Scottish Railway Company.
- Andrew Naesmith, OBE, JP, General Secretary, Amalgamated Weavers' Association.
- Arthur Eastwood Nichols, MC, Headmaster, Hele's School, Exeter.
- Lieutenant-Colonel Leonard Raymond Rake, DL, Secretary, Territorial and Auxiliary Forces Association of the County of London.
- Robert O'Field Oakley, OBE, Assistant Secretary, Department of Scientific and Industrial Research.
- Gerald Richard Paling, assistant director of Public Prosecutions.
- Herbert Edgar Parkes, Member, Panel of Representatives of Employers, National Arbitration Tribunal.
- George Herbert Edmeston Parr, MBE, Secretary, Ministry of Commerce, Northern Ireland.
- Councillor Sydney Woodroffe Pascall, JP, Director of James Pascall Ltd. For services to the Ministry of Food.
- Harold Charles West Roberts, MC, Deputy Chief Inspector of Mines, Ministry of Fuel and Power.
- Gilbert Wooding Robinson, MA, ScD, JP, Professor of Agricultural Chemistry, University College of North Wales, Bangor.
- John William Rodden, Director of Milk Products, Ministry of Food.
- Albert Ells Rogers, Higher Collector, London Port, HM Customs and Excise.
- Major Andrew Alexander Ross, OBE, Chief Technical Adviser to the Director of Engine Research and Development, Ministry of Supply.
- Captain Archibald Hamilton Ryley, lately Elder Brother, Trinity House Corporation.
- Clifford Fortescue Loftus St. George, Clerk of the Journals, House of Lords.
- Frank Ellison Sargant, FRICS, Deputy Chief Valuer, Board of Inland Revenue.
- Thomas Montgomery Service, Director, William Beardmore and Company Ltd., Glasgow.
- Sydney Taverner Shovelton, Chairman of the Council of the Federated Superannuation System for Universities.
- Alexander William Southam, Director, Economic Division, Allied Commission for Austria (British Element).
- Herbert William Spencer, OBE, Assistant Secretary, Ministry of Works.
- Ferdinand Christian Otto Speyer, Member, Advisory Committee to the Board of Trade on Fertilisers.
- George French Stebbing, MB, BS, FRCS, Member and Honorary Secretary of the Radium Commission.
- Thomas Frederick Storey, President, Ulster Tourist Development Association.
- Arthur Nicholson Stuart, Adviser to the Ministry of Food on tea production.
- George Henry Taylor, Deputy Regional Director, London Telecommunications Region, General Post Office.
- Margerie Venables Taylor, FSA, for services to archaeology.
- James Osborne Teare, Deputy Secretary and Establishment Officer, Exchequer and Audit Department.
- Laurence Edward Victor Tiffen, Assistant Secretary, Ministry of National Insurance.
- Douglas Learoyd Walker, General Secretary, Federation of British Industries.
- Ida Caroline Ward, DLit, Professor of West African Languages, School of Oriental and African Studies, University of London.
- John Percival Watson, Special Director and Manager, Fire Control Drawing Office, Vickers-Armstrongs Ltd., Crayford.
- Alderman James Albert Webb, MBE, JP, chairman, North-Western Division, National Coal Board.
- Arthur Reginald Astley Weston, Assistant Solicitor, Ministry of Agriculture and Fisheries.
- Charles Thomas Wheeler, RA, President of the Royal Society of British Sculptors.
- Arthur Whitley, OBE, Finance Officer, Home Office.
- Captain Walter Douglas Melville Wills, JP, chairman, Somerset War Agricultural Executive Committee.
- Herbert Winstanley, OBE, Chief Constable, Liverpool.
- Frank Simcox Winterbottom, Partner, Leonard Plews, Stockdale & Co. Ltd., Manchester.
- Allan Richard Wood, Comptroller of the London County Council.
- Terence Vincent Brenan, OBE, lately His Majesty's Consul-General at Rabat.
- John Colville Hutchison, OBE, Minister (Commercial) at His Majesty's Embassy in Nanking.
- Leslie Charles Kemp, British subject resident in Greece.
- Robert Wynn Mortimore, British subject resident in the United States of America.
- Lieutenant-Colonel Geoffrey Edelston Wheeler, CIE, Head of Information Department, His Majesty's Embassy in Tehran.
- Harold William Bennetts, DVSc, Principal, Animal Health and Nutrition Laboratory, Department of Agriculture, State of Western Australia.
- William Ernest Bold, formerly Town Clerk, City of Perth, State of Western Australia.
- John Burke, MD, CM. For devoted service as a medical practitioner and surgeon in the Districts of Grand Bank and Fortune, Newfoundland.
- Lieutenant-Colonel Robert Walker Roylance, Treasurer, Victoria League.
- Roland Starkey, MInstMM. For public services in Southern Rhodesia, especially in connection with asbestos mining.
- John Smith Teasdale. For services to Agriculture, and particularly to the wheat growing industry, in the State of Western Australia.
- John Lamb Leyden, OBE, Director, Frontier Areas Administration, Burma.
- Philip Geoffrey Elwin Nash, OBE, Indian Civil Service, Deputy Commissioner, Burma.
- Percy George Graham Salkeld, MBE, General Manager, Messrs. Steel Brothers & Co. Ltd., Burma.
- Captain Richard Waverley Head Ballantine, Colonial Police Service, Commissioner of Police, Gold Coast.
- John Ignatius De Aguiar. For public services in British Guiana.
- Mehmed Halid, Colonial Legal Service, Puisne Judge, Cyprus.
- Dora Ibberson, Social Welfare Adviser to the Comptroller for Development and Welfare in the West Indies.
- Colonel Hau Shik Lee, JP. For public services in the Malayan Union.
- William Lachlan Smith Mackintosh, MRCVS, Colonial Veterinary Service, Director of Veterinary Services, Uganda.
- Alfred Muchmore, OBE, Colonial Administrative Service, Financial Secretary, Aden.
- Arthur Godwin Ranasinha, Ceylon Civil Service, Commissioner of Lands.
- Algar Ronald Ward Robertson, Financial Secretary and Treasurer, Fiji.
- Cecil Yaxley Shephard, PhD, Professor of Economics, Imperial College of Tropical Agriculture, Trinidad.

Dated 14 August 1947

- Thomas Vaughan Baddeley, Director in Charge, Tata Textile Mills, Bombay.
- Jean Begg, OBE, Director, Welfare Services, Young Women's Christian Association.
- Brigadier Sydney Phillips Cane, Director of Transportation, Civil Supplies Department, Bengal.
- Mark Daniels, OBE, Director of Purchase, Store Department, Office of the High Commissioner for India in London.
- Ann, Lady Dow (wife of His Excellency Sir Hugh Dow, KCSI, CIE, Governor of Bihar). For welfare work among women and children.
- Arthur Edward Foot, Headmaster, Doon School, Dehra Dun, India.
- Leslie Albiston Halsall, Manager, The Anglo-Thai Corporation Ltd., Bombay.
- Isabel, Lady Hutton, MD, lately Director of Welfare, Indian Red Cross and St. John War Organisation.
- Conrad Powell-Johnstone, Manager, Burmah-Shell Oil Storage & Distributing Company of India Ltd., Madras.
- Walter Harold Casimir Kelland, Chief Engineer, Bengal Nagpur Railway, Garden Reach, Calcutta.
- Sydney Richard Pocock, MBE, MC, Cotton Broker, Cawnpore, United Provinces, India.
- Arthur John Kemp Richardson, Member, Legislative Assembly, Manager, Barrah Estates, Barachakia, Muzaffarpur, Secretary, Bihar Planters' Association, Bihar.
- Mir Shaukat Ali Khan, Mir of Nagir.
- Kenneth Forbes Glascott Stronach, MC, Director-General (Consumer Goods), Civil Supplies Department, Bengal.
- Norman Thornton, Punjab Service of Engineers, Chief Engineer and Secretary to the Government of the Punjab in the Public Works Department, Electricity Branch.

Honorary Commanders

- Alhaji the Honourable Usuman Nagogo, Emir of Katsina, Nigeria.
- John Clifford Bugher, Director of the Yellow Fever Research Institute, Yaba, Lagos, Nigeria.

==== Officer of the Order of the British Empire (OBE) ====
Military Division

Royal Navy

- Instructor Commander Geoffrey Meeker Clark, MA.
- Lieutenant-Commander Gerald Cobb.
- Engineer Captain Aldridge Evelegh, (Retired).
- Acting Lieutenant-Commander (S) Joseph Patrick Flanagan.
- Lieutenant-Colonel John William Lawson, MSM, Royal Marines.
- Acting Captain Cecil Stanley Draper Noakes.
- Commander Awbery Richmond Bishop Phelp.
- The Reverend William Harold Davis Shepherd, Chaplain.
- Acting Captain John Edmund Sissmore, DSC, (Retired).
- Commander (E) William Leonard Spear.
- Surgeon Lieutenant-Commander John Ward Walker, MB, ChB
- Acting Temporary-Commander Thomas Alexander Leitch, Royal Indian Naval Reserve (dated 14 August 1947).

Army

- Lieutenant-Colonel (acting) Thomas Frederick Abbott (290368), Army Cadet Force.
- Lieutenant-Colonel (temporary) Robert Langley Kirkhead Allen (6183), The Royal Welch Fusiliers.
- Colonel (then Lieutenant-Colonel) William Proctor Bell Ashton, MC, BSc (Eng.), AMIMechE, (31326), Royal Electrical and Mechanical Engineers.
- Colonel (acting) (then Lieutenant-Colonel (temporary)) Keith Lionel Beddington (23633), Royal Regiment of Artillery.
- Lieutenant-Colonel (temporary) Albert Edward Bevan, MA, (18447), Royal Army Educational Corps.
- Lieutenant-Colonel (temporary) William Rixon Bucknall (13529), The Black Watch (Royal Highland Regiment).
- Lieutenant-Colonel (temporary) (Quartermaster) Harry George Chard (123325), General List, Infantry.
- Lieutenant-Colonel (temporary) Michael Corder, (39633), The King's Own Royal Regiment (Lancaster).
- Lieutenant-Colonel (Quartermaster) Lawrence Corrigan (33505), The Royal Ulster Rifles.
- Lieutenant-Colonel (temporary) Peter James Glover (62881), Royal Regiment of Artillery.
- Lieutenant-Colonel (temporary) John Kyme Greenwood (56746), Royal Tank Regiment, Royal Armoured Corps.
- Lieutenant-Colonel (temporary) Frederick Arthur Harris (160573), The Queen's Own Royal West Kent Regiment.
- Lieutenant-Colonel (temporary) Peter Mervyn Hunt, DSO, (67201), The Queen's Own Cameron Highlanders.
- Lieutenant-Colonel (temporary) William Stuart King, AMIMechE, (34469), Royal Regiment of Artillery.
- Lieutenant-Colonel Clarence Kirk, FSI, (42184), Corps of Royal Engineers.
- Lieutenant-Colonel (temporary) John Knowles (109327), Royal Army Service Corps.
- Lieutenant-Colonel (temporary) Robert Eric Lampen (672), The King's Regiment (Liverpool).
- Lieutenant-Colonel (temporary) Austin Peter Lavies, BA, (49861), Corps of Royal Engineers.
- Lieutenant-Colonel John Herbert Barker Lowe, (11472), Corps of Royal Engineers.
- Lieutenant-Colonel (temporary) Arthur George Joseph Luffmann, BSc, (225027), Royal Electrical and Mechanical Engineers.
- Lieutenant-Colonel John Francis Xavier Miller, MIMechE, (35255), Royal Army Ordnance Corps.
- Lieutenant-Colonel (temporary) Hugh Graham George Niven (32076), The Royal Berkshire Regiment (Princess Charlotte of Wales's).
- Lieutenant-Colonel (temporary) Wilfred York Price, MC, (11766), The Welch Regiment.
- Lieutenant-Colonel Arthur George Proudlock, DSO, (38421), Royal Regiment of Artillery.
- Lieutenant-Colonel Lionel Horace Richards, (272735), Army Cadet Force.
- Lieutenant-Colonel (temporary) Herbert Carington Smith, BA, (38861), Corps of Royal Engineers.
- Lieutenant-Colonel (temporary) (Quartermaster) Frank Spinks (90432), Royal Army Service Corps.
- Lieutenant Colonel (temporary) Denis Swinburne (18077), The Royal Ulster Rifles.
- Lieutenant-Colonel & Staff Paymaster Class I (temporary) John Christopher Lloyd Thomas (44227), Royal Army Pay Corps.
- Lieutenant-Colonel (temporary) Patrick Cecil Carus Tweedie (56133), The Queen's Own Cameron Highlanders.
- Lieutenant-Colonel (temporary) John Maxwell White (44206), The King's Royal Rifle Corps.
- Lieutenant-Colonel Sidney Hampden White, TD, (51248), General List, Infantry, Territorial Army Reserve of Officers.
- Major (Temporary Lieutenant-Colonel) Robert Leslie Harman, Officer Commanding, 1st Battalion, The Karen Rifles, Burma.
- Major (Temporary Lieutenant-Colonel) Arthur Victor Perry, Officer Commanding, 2nd Battalion, The Kachin Rifles, Burma.
- Major (Temporary Lieutenant-Colonel) Edward Deloraine Tims, Officer Commanding, 1st Battalion, The Kachin Rifles, Burma.
- Major William Athelstan Aeria, ED, Singapore Volunteer Corps,
- Lieutenant-Colonel Frank Edward Gilpin, (5323), Royal Regiment of Artillery, Officer Commanding Troops, St. Helena.
- Lieutenant-Colonel William Maurice James, Federated Malay States Volunteer Corps.
- Major Laurence Arthur Williams, Officer Commanding "G" (MG) Company, Singapore Volunteer Corps.

Dated 14 August 1947

- Colonel William Alexander Broadfoot, Skinner's Horse, Indian Army.
- Lieutenant-Colonel (Temporary Brigadier) George Vincent Leigh Coleman, Adjutant-General's Branch, G.H.Q., India.
- Colonel (local Brigadier) William Edmund Hunt Condon, Director, Combined Inter-Services Historical Section (India).
- Lieutenant-Colonel (Temporary Brigadier) Franz Reginald Lindsay Goadby, MBE, Rajputana Rifles, Indian Army.
- Colonel (Temporary Brigadier) Frank Leslie Harry, Indian Army.
- Lieutenant-Colonel (Temporary Brigadier) Raymond Sinclair Johnson, 1st Punjab Regiment, Indian Army.
- Lieutenant-Colonel (Temporary Colonel) Harold Shuker, 1st Punjab Regiment, late Provost Marshal, India.
- Lieutenant-Colonel (Temporary Colonel) William Edward Harper Talbot, 14th Punjab Regiment, Indian Army.
- Lieutenant-Colonel (Temporary Colonel) Robert Douglas Whitehill, Indian Army, late 2nd Punjab Regiment.
- Major (Temporary Lieutenant Colonel) Frederick William Whiteman, Indian Medical Service, Indian Army Medical Corps.
- Lieutenant-Colonel (Temporary Brigadier) Arthur John Millard Wilton, Indian Army, Mahratta Light Infantry.

Royal Air Force

- Group Captain Cuthbert Caumont Bazell.
- Acting Group Captain Anthony George Carl Somerhough, MBE.
- Wing Commander Edward Lawrence Colbeck-Welch, DFC, (34081).
- Wing Commander Alec Baden Kendall, MBE, (35095).
- Wing Commander Theodore Urquhart Rolfe (33013).
- Acting Wing Commander Harold Gordon Blake (35387).
- Acting Wing Commander Glendor Godfrey Nicholas Marshall, MBE, (31020).
- Acting Wing Commander Douglas George Scott (31171).
- Acting Squadron Leader Francis Peter McKenna (189121), RAF Volunteer Reserve.
- Acting Squadron Leader Stanley John Marriott (105301), RAF Volunteer Reserve.
- Acting Squadron Leader George Samuel Morris (43591).
- Acting Squadron Leader Arthur Harry Phillips, MC, (186926), RAF Volunteer Reserve.
- Acting Wing Officer Jean Lena Annette Conan Doyle, (550), Women's Auxiliary Air Force.
- Acting Squadron Leader William Mace Mair (Can/C.7671), Royal Canadian Air Force.
- Wing Commander John Tregonwell Davison, GM, (N.Z.39906), Royal New Zealand Air Force.

Civil Division

- Edgar James Allies, Accountant, Commonwealth Relations Office.
- Captain William Appleby, Member, National Executive Council, British Legion.
- Charles Thomas Stanhope Arnett, MIEE, Manager, North West England and North Wales Area, Central Electricity Board.
- Richard Leonard Atkinson, MC, FSA, Secretary, Historical Manuscripts Commission.
- Commander Francis Herbert Austen, Royal Navy (Retired), Commandant, Home Office Civil Defence School, Easingwold.
- James Austin, Secretary and Treasurer, Glasgow Veterinary College.
- Alderman Malcolm Macdonald Barbour, JP, chairman, South Shields Savings Committee.
- Edith Mary Batten, Lately Principal, Ministry of Labour and National Service.
- Arthur Baxter, Founder and National President of the British Limbless Ex-Service Men's Association.
- George Bennison, Lately Commandant, National Fire Service College.
- Nancie Elizabeth Berger, Statistician, Ministry of Fuel and Power.
- Francis Horace Berry, Assistant Chief Constable, City of Edinburgh Police.
- Cyril Alfred George Biggs, Director of Printing and Binding, HM Stationery Office.
- Edward Blades, LLD. For services to Army education in Scotland.
- Arthur Bower, Assistant Regional Controller, North Midlands Region, Ministry of Labour and National Service.
- Guy Bown, managing director, Red & White Services Ltd., Monmouthshire and Gloucestershire.
- Sidney Albert Brazier, Technical Manager, Dunlop Rubber Company Ltd.
- Henry Brown, FSAA, Honorary Secretary, Rochester Savings Committee.
- Theophilus Edward Brown, MBE, Honorary Legal Adviser to the Incorporated Soldiers', Sailors' and Airmen's Help Society and Lord Roberts Memorial Workshops.
- Richard Frank Bryan, Chairman of Directors and managing director, Frank Bryan Ltd.
- Ernest William Burbridge, Regional Representative of the British Council for the Midland area of the United Kingdom.
- Frederick Cyril Gilmore Butler, Principal, Ministry of Education.
- Herbert Stanley Butt, Factory Manager, Bristol Aeroplane Company (Housing) Ltd.
- Arthur Henry Carter, deputy director, Sea Transport Division, Ministry of Transport.
- Martin Chadwick, Fire Force Commander, Western (No. 1) Area of Scotland, National Fire Service.
- Sidney James Chamberlain, MBE, DFC, Assistant Secretary, Metropolitan Police Office.
- James Clayton, Assistant Accountant General, General Post Office.
- Ernest William Clegg, JP, chairman, Sheffield Court of Referees.
- Cecily Cook, General Secretary, Women's Co-operative Guild.
- Arthur George Cookman, Principal, Ministry of Agriculture and Fisheries.
- William Cation Crawford, Engineer Manager, Harland & Wolff Ltd., Glasgow.
- Victoria Mary Crosse, MD, Deputy Senior Assistant Medical Officer of Health, City of Birmingham.
- Eugene Curran, Director and General Manager, Curran Steels Ltd., Cardiff.
- Henry Darlow, Town Clerk, Bedford.
- Lieutenant-Colonel David Grey Davies, County Organiser, Army Welfare Service, Flintshire.
- William Robert Dayton. For services as Deputy Regional Controller, Ministry of Labour and National Service.
- Edward William Ditchburn, Director of Fighting Vehicle Production, Ministry of Supply.
- William Edmund Doran, MICE, Chief Engineer, River Great Ouse Catchment Board.
- Raymond Noel Dorey, FRAeS, Manager, Hucknall Division, Rolls-Royce Ltd.
- John Dougherty, Scottish District Secretary, National Union of Dyers, Bleachers and Textile Workers.
- Frederick Harold Dupre, MBE, Principal Scientific Officer, Home Office Section, Royal Arsenal, Woolwich.
- Frank Eames. For services as Secretary, Incorporated Society of Musicians.
- Herbert Eborall, MBE, Administrative Officer, Air Ministry.
- Colonel Ivor Cyrus Edwards, TD, Deputy Chief, Public Relations and Information Services Control, Control Commission for Germany (British Element).
- Captain Thomas Elliot, JP, Vice-Chaifman, Berwickshire Agricultural Executive Committee.
- The Reverend Ivor Evans, chairman, Abertillery Juvenile Employment Committee.
- John Turle Evans, managing director and Engineer, Trent Navigation Company.
- Roland Owen Grayson-Evans, Acting Controller, Food, Agriculture, Forestry and Fisheries Branch, Economic Division, Allied Commission for Austria (British Element).
- Clifford Ernest Foster Everett, Chairman of the Regional Joint Committee for the Building Industry, Eastern Region.
- Captain George Edward Thomas Eyston, MC, Member, Southern Regional Board for Industry.
- Katherine Diana Falconer, lately Lady Provost of Edinburgh.
- The Reverend William Feore (The Reverend Brother Benedict), Manager of Approved Schools, Order of Brothers of the Christian Schools.
- Councillor Jacob Lewis Fine, JP. For public services in Stepney.
- Charles Richard Flynn, JP. For public services in Gateshead.
- Sidney James Forsyth, Director of Public Relations, Gaumont British Picture Corporation Ltd.
- Anne Geddes Gilchrist, FSA. For services to Folk Song Music.
- Alderman William Henry Girling, lately Mayor of Shoreditch.
- William Graham Glennie, Deputy Regional Controller, South Western Region, Board of Trade.
- John Clyde Goodman, Partner, Gray Dawes & Co., London. Lately Chairman, Shipping Deferment Advisory Committee.
- Charles Harry Clinton Pirie-Gordon, DSC, Director of Ceremonies, Order of St. John of Jerusalem.
- John Greaves, FRIBA, Principal Architect, Ministry of Health.
- Stanley Walter Green, MBE, Principal, HM Treasury.
- Thomas Alfred Guest, Mechanical Engineer, Manchester Ship Canal Company.
- Andrew Hamilton, Sheriff Clerk of Fife.
- John Arthur Hamlyn, FRICS, Assistant Chief Surveyor, Ministry of Works.
- Archibald Standish Hartrick, RWS, Artist.
- Sydney George Hearn, Principal Assistant to the Superintendent of the Line, Great Western Railway Company.
- Henry Hicken, Labour Director, East Midlands Division, National Coal Board.
- Agnes Hedvig Hicks, lately Administrative Officer, Grade I, Foreign Office.
- John Noel Hill, MIEE, Telephone Manager, South East Area, London Telecommunications Region, General Post Office.
- Thomas Hewson Hodgson. For services as National Officer, Agricultural Section, Transport and General Workers' Union.
- Marion Edith Felton Vesey Holt, Member of the council, Royal Air Force Benevolent Fund.
- Rosamund Hornby, Regional Administrator, South Eastern Region, Women's Voluntary Services.
- Isabel May Hornsby, Headmistress, Orange Hill Selective Secondary Modern Girls' School, Hendon.
- William Pearson Humphreys, lately Regional Training Officer, Scotland, General Post Office.
- Captain William James Hutchinson, Chief Constable of Brighton.
- David Gordon Hyslop, Assistant Collector, Higher Grade, Board of Customs and Excise.
- Nathan Isaacs, deputy director, Home Flax Production Department, Board of Trade.
- Cecil Jackson, MIStructE, Chief Materials Officer, Ministry of Works.
- Alderman Thomas Johnson, JP, Divisional Organiser for the Plumbers', Glaziers' and Domestic Engineers' Union, Nottingham.
- Arthur Glyn Prys-Jones, Staff Inspector for Secondary Education in Wales.
- Harry Jones, MBE, chief executive officer, Foreign Office.
- Councillor Horace Percy Jones, JP, chairman, Stourbridge Local Employment Committee and Juvenile Advisory Committee.
- Hilda Muriel Jorden, Joint Regional Administrator, Midland Region, Women's Voluntary Services.
- Nicholas Keating, LRCPI, LRCSI, Senior Member, South Wales Panel, Silicosis Medical Board, Ministry of National Insurance.
- Frederick Kennedy, Principal, Colonial Office.
- Maurice John Kingham, chairman, Southern Division, Area Provisions and Groceries Committee.
- Major Geoffrey Herbert Kitson, chairman, Leeds Savings Committee.
- Meriel Louise Helen Konig, Honorary County Organiser of Young Farmers' Clubs for West Sussex.
- Dennis Hamilton Kyle, managing director, British Iron & Steel Corporation (Ore) Ltd.
- Alfred Lawson, Principal, Air Ministry.
- William Lawson, MBE, County Agricultural Organiser, West Sussex County Council, lately Executive Officer, West Sussex War Agricultural Executive Committee.
- Robert Walker Leckie, Secretary and Director, Scottish Co-operative Wholesale Society Ltd.
- Duncan Douglas Livesey, chairman, Liverpool Trade Advisory Council for Industrial Savings.
- William John Longley, Principal, Ministry of Fuel and Power.
- Percy Tom Loosemore, Clerk to the Plympton St. Mary Rural District Council.
- Alfred Lynas, Chairman of the Savings Committee, Portadown, County Armagh.
- Percy Henry Lyon, Deputy Divisional Food Officer, North Midland Division, Ministry of Food.
- Daniel McCartan, Clerk of the Crown and Peace and Registration Officer for County Down, Northern Ireland.
- The Honourable Gylla Constance Susan, Lady MacGregor of MacGregor, Member, Scottish Committee, Council of Industrial Design.
- George Arthur Mallinson, Secretary and Manager, National Pharmaceutical Union.
- Montague May, assistant director of Armament Supply, Admiralty.
- Henry Greig Mitchell, JP. For public services in Brechin.
- Thomas Haig Moffat, chairman, St. Andrew's Ambulance Association.
- Captain Sydney Edward Moon, TD, chairman, Plymouth Wing Committee, Air Training Corps.
- Lieutenant-Colonel Reginald William Murphy, MBE, Chief Administrative Officer, United Kingdom District, Imperial War Graves Commission.
- Joseph Wickham Murray, Deputy Secretary, National Union of Teachers.
- Major George Edward Neve, Local Army Welfare Officer, County of London.
- Sidney Rudolph Neville, managing director, British Ropes Ltd., Charlton.
- William Alfred Cyril Newman, ARSM, ARCS, FRIC, Chemist and Assayer, Royal Mint.
- Grace Nicholls, Headmistress, Bridgwater Girls' Grammar School, Somerset.
- George Nicholson, Manager, Scottish -Division, British European Airways Corporation.
- John Henry Cyril Ottley, Regional Officer, Midlands Region, Assistance Board.
- Thomas Frederick Parnell (Fred Russell), President of the Variety Artistes' Federation.
- Anthony Leonard Peyman, chairman, Reading Local Appeal Board.
- Cyril Guest Phillips. For services as assistant director of Telecommunications, Ministry of Civil Aviation.
- Edgar Aneurin Phillips, District Probate Registrar, Llandaff and Carmarthen.
- Ernest George Phillips, MIMechE, MIEE, chairman, North Midland Regional Fuel Efficiency Committee.
- Grevile Herbert Phillips, FAI, lately chief executive officer, Hereford War Agricultural Executive Committee.
- Lawrence George Polden, MBE, Head of Branch, Ministry of National Insurance.
- William George Poole, Works Manager, W. H. Allen Sons & Co. Ltd., Bedford.
- Richard William Quayle, Senior Legal Assistant, Board of Inland Revenue.
- Walter Quimby, DCM, Deputy Accountant General, Board of Customs and Excise.
- William Ruffell Rayner, Administrative Officer, Commonwealth Relations Office.
- Charles Westcott Reeves, Supervising Valuer, War Office.
- Major Frederick Cecil Reeves, chairman, Parliamentary Committee, National Federation of Grocers' and Provision Dealers' Associations.
- Samuel Reid, Chairman of Wages Councils, Northern Ireland.
- Leila Margaret Rendel, Director of the Caldecott Community.
- Henry Willasey Brookes Richards, chairman, Whitchurch Savings Committee.
- Mary Olivia Robinson, Chief Nursing Officer, Department of Health for Scotland.
- Bernard Rochford, JP, lately chairman, Glasshouse Committee, National Farmers' Union.
- Charles Ernest Rogerson, FSAA, Principal, Geo. A. Marriott Rogerson & Co., Manchester.
- Frederick Amory Ruddock, ARIC, Professor of Chemistry and Metallurgy, Royal Naval College, Greenwich.
- Peter Scott, Rural Land Utilisation Officer for Wales, Ministry of Agriculture and Fisheries.
- Frederick John Scrase, ScD, Superintendent of Instruments, Meteorological Office, Air Ministry.
- Major Geoffrey Cameron Scrimgeour, DSO, MC, Clerk of the Peace and Clerk of the council, Cheshire County Council.
- John Millar Shearer, chairman, Londonderry Joint City and County Savings Committee.
- Hugh Haydon Shilston, Senior Examiner, Patent Office.
- John Spencer Smith, Principal, Ministry of Fuel and Power.
- Herbert George Sorrell, deputy director, Coasting and Short Sea Division, Ministry of Transport.
- Basil Spence, FRIBA, Architect to the "Enterprise Scotland, 1947" Exhibition.
- Thomas Brown Stephens. For public and philanthropic services to the London Welsh Community.
- Major Henry Lockwood Stevens, Organising Secretary, Ross Institute of Tropical Hygiene.
- Albert Gordon Store, Operations Manager, British South American Airways Corporation.
- Ernest William Swanton, MBE, Curator, Haslemere Educational Museum.
- John Medows Theobald, MIStructE, Senior Partner, Gardiner & Theobald, London, Chartered Quantity Surveyors.
- Henry Charles Baden Thomas, Chief of the Aeronautical Engineering Branch, New York, Ministry of Supply.
- Francis Longstreth Thompson, FSI, AMICE, County Planning Adviser to the Essex County Council.
- James Thompson, Town Clerk, Londonderry.
- William Arthur Tiley, Senior Inspector of Taxes, Board of Inland Revenue.
- Frederick John Toone, managing director, Parmeko Ltd., Leicester.
- Henry Woodall Townley, General Secretary, Loyal Order of Ancient Shepherds (Ashton Unity), Friendly Society.
- Howard Cecil Tyson, assistant director of Expense Accounts, Admiralty.
- Major Norman Underhill, lately Secretary, Territorial and Auxiliary Forces Association of the County of Surrey.
- Archibald James Voce, Superintendent, Royal Ordnance Factory, Dalmuir, Glasgow.
- Councillor Frank Vincent Voysey, JP, chairman, Tiverton Rural District Council.
- Herbert Roy Wardill, Regional Planning Officer, Ministry of Town and Country Planning.
- Cyril West, DSc, Superintendent, Ditton Laboratory of the Food Investigation Organisation, Department of Scientific and Industrial Research.
- Andrew Scott Weston, TD, lately Principal, War Office.
- Allan Whitfield, Senior Control Officer, Control Commission for Germany (British Element).
- Fred Williamson, AMInstT, Principal, Ministry of Transport.
- Oscar Reginald Lewis Wilson, MB, BS, MRCS, LRCP, Principal Medical Officer, Ministry of Pensions.
- Wilfrid Simeon Arthur Winter, Principal, Ministry of Works.
- Wing Commander Henry Irving Wood, Royal Air Force (Retired), Operations Officer, Grade I, Ministry of Civil Aviation.
- William Edward David Allen, Head of Information Department, His Majesty's Embassy in Ankara.
- Stanley Victor James Chambers, First Secretary (Commercial) at His Majesty's Legation in Budapest.
- Geoffrey William Courtney, attached to a Department of the Foreign Office.
- Trefor Ellis Evans, First Secretary at His Majesty's Legation at Beirut.
- George Nigel Stafford Gobey, Assistant General Manager of Administration, Anglo-Iranian Oil Company, Tehran.
- William Harpham, until recently First Secretary (Commercial) at His Majesty's Legation at Beirut. (Now Acting Counsellor (Commercial) at His Majesty's Legation at Berne.)
- Commander (S) Lloyd Hirst, Royal Navy (Retired), lately Assistant Naval Attaché at His Majesty's Embassy at Buenos Aires.
- Priscilla Pote-Hunt, British subject resident in the United States of America.
- Gilbert Alfred Last, MBE, British subject resident in Brazil.
- Richard Lucius Dixie Maunsel, Works Manager, Sudan Railways.
- George De Menasce, British subject resident in Egypt.
- The Honourable Violet Grace Merriman, Staff Commander, Women's Transport Service (First Aid Nursing Yeomanry). For services in South-East Asia, prior to 2 September 1945.
- Michael Norman Francis Stewart, First Secretary (Information) at His Majesty's Embassy in Rome.
- Geoffrey Murat Tait, British subject resident in Portugal.
- James Mark Walsh, First Secretary at His Majesty's Legation at Budapest.
- Edward Redston Warner, First Secretary in charge of the United Kingdom Permanent Delegation Office, Geneva.
- Nance Grant-Allan. For voluntary social welfare services in the State of South Australia.
- Margaret Hamilton Brown, of Wilderness School for Girls, Adelaide, State of South Australia. For services to Education.
- William Frederick Crace-Calvert. For public services in the State of Tasmania.
- James Alfred Cope-Christie, FRIBA, a prominent architect in Southern Rhodesia.
- Gordon Green, BEM, lately General Secretary of the Fairbridge Society.
- Helen Willans Hooper, formerly President, now Life Vice-president of the National Council of Women, State of South Australia.
- Margaret Edgeworth McIntyre. For voluntary services in connection with educational and cultural movements in the State of Tasmania.
- Andrew Love Millar. For services to Agriculture and the cattle industry in Southern Rhodesia.
- William Nicholls, chairman, District Council of Stirling, State of South Australia.
- Archie Hurtle Oakley, lately Secretary, Police Department, State of South Australia.
- Nigel Arran Philip. For public and social welfare services in Southern Rhodesia.
- Ernest George Record. For services in connection with the social welfare of children, particularly those handicapped by infirmity, in the State of Tasmania.
- William James Air, Deputy Railway Commissioner and Secretary, Burma Railway Board.
- Ronald Cecil Flux, Superintending Engineer, Buildings and Roads Department, Burma.
- Hugh Vivian Hinds, Deputy Conservator of Forests, Burma.
- Robert Wingate McIntyre, Manager, Messrs. Cowie & Co., Rangoon, Burma.
- Donald Rhind, Senior Economic Botanist, Burma.
- Samuel Aubrey Wetherfield, deputy chairman and Chief Accountant, Rangoon Port Commissioners, Burma.
- Captain William Thomas Brindley, Colonial Police Service, Deputy Inspector-General of Police, Ceylon.
- Edward Rowland Chadwick, Colonial Administrative Service, Senior District Officer, Nigeria.
- Sydney Theophilus Christian. For public services in Antigua, Leeward Islands.
- Thomas Frank Davey, MD, ChB, Medical Officer, Leprosy Service, Owerri Area, Nigeria.
- Archdeacon Charles Stokely Doorly, Rector of Christ Church, Cascade, Port-of-Spain, Trinidad.
- Philip John Elliott, Head of Shipping Department, Crown Agents for the Colonies.
- John Leslie Fletcher, TD, Colonial Customs Services, deputy director of Customs and Excise, Palestine.
- Captain Cyril William Archie Gooding Hamley, Royal Navy (Retired), Port Manager, Kenya and Uganda Railways and Harbours.
- Major James Parminter Hearle. For public services in Kenya.
- Henry William Howes, Director of Education, Gibraltar.
- Inche Ibrahim bin Mohamed Jahfar, lately Brunei Administrative Service.
- Henry Strathmore Jemmott, Auditor General, Barbados.
- Herbert Macdonald, Chief Liaison Officer of the British West Indies Labour Organisation, Caribbean Commission, Washington.
- Christian William Fraser Mackay, MB, ChB, Colonial Medical Service, assistant director of Medical Services, Gambia.
- Marie Auguste Desire Rene Maigrot. For public services in Mauritius.
- Amar Nath Maini. For public services in Uganda.
- Hafeezudin Sirajudin Moonshi, LMS. For public services in Singapore.
- Edgar Parry, Commissioner of Labour, Sierra Leone.
- Ruttonjee Pestonjee Patell. For public services in Aden.
- John Smith Manyo-Plange, Crown Counsel, Gold Coast.
- Harold Robert Price, Director of Public Works, Nyasaland.
- John Alfred Smith, lately Sarawak Government Agent in the United Kingdom.
- Benjamin Wong Tape. For public services in Hong Kong.
- Samuel Magnus Walker, JP. For public services in Jamaica.

Dated 14 August 1947

- Harriet Elizabeth Acheson, MD, MRCS, LRCP, Women's Medical Service, Vice-Principal, Lady Hardinge Medical College, New Delhi, and Professor of Obstetrics and Gynaecology, Lady Hardinge Medical College.
- Phillip Francis Adams, MBE, Indian Civil Service, Secretary to His Excellency the Governor of Assam, Shillong.
- Khan Bahadur Raja Mohammed Anwar Khan, Governor of Punial, Kashmir.
- William George Archer, Indian Civil Service, lately Magistrate and Collector, Bihar.
- George Hubert Parke Bailey, Indian Police, deputy director, Intelligence Bureau, Home Department, Government of India.
- Gordon Murray Bathgate, Senior Partner, Messrs. A. F. Ferguson & Co., Chartered Accountants, Bombay.
- William James Berry, MBE, Superintending Engineer, Health Services and Engineer, Secretary, Delhi Joint Water and Sewage Board.
- Henry James Leslie Biggie, Indian Police, Administrative Commandant, Special Armed Constabulary Forces, Lucknow, United Provinces.
- Alfred Augustus Brown, Director, Traffic (General) Railway Board.
- Christopher Lenwood Bryson, Indian Civil Service, District Magistrate, Ganjam, Orissa.
- Errington Garth Carter, Vice Principal, Lawrence Royal Military School, Sanawar, India.
- Francis Norman Cole, Indian Civil Service, Deputy Commissioner, Jubbulpore, Central Provinces and Berar.
- Rupert Trevlyn Collins, Financial Adviser and Chief Accounts Officer, Bombay, Baroda & Central India Railway.
- Joseph Neild Compton, Chief Controller of Standardization, Railway Board, India.
- William James Coode, Chief Controller of Railway Priorities.
- William Louis Charles Gerard Cook, Indian Police, Assistant Inspector-General of Police, Bengal.
- Thomas Cowie, lately Director of Stores, Indian Red Cross and St. John War Organisation.
- Margaretta Craig, Principal, College of Nursing, Delhi, India.
- Denis Hayes Crofton, MBE, Indian Civil Service, Secretary to His Excellency the Governor of Bihar.
- Thomas Bigham Crossley, Indian Civil Service, District Magistrate and Collector, Allahabad, United Provinces.
- Lieutenant-Colonel Charles O'Brien Daunt, MC, Indian Army (retired), Commandant, Mewar State Forces, Udaipur (Mewar).
- William Frederick Mant Davies, Indian Police, deputy director, Intelligence Bureau, Home Department, Government of India.
- Rai Bahadur Barmiak Kazi, Tashi Dadul Densapa, Landlord, Private Secretary to His Highness the Maharaja of Sikkim.
- James Barr Durning, Superintendent, Metal and Steel Factory, Ishapore, India.
- Eric Martin Egan, Chief Commercial Manager, North Western Railway, Lahore, India.
- Gerald Herbert Emerson, Indian Political Service, lately Political Agent, Zhob, Baluchistan.
- Patrick Scott Lethbridge-Farmer, Indian Police, Assistant Inspector-General of Police, Punjab.
- Major Leslie Alfred Charles Fry, MBE, Indian Political Service, lately Deputy Secretary to the Government of India in the External Affairs and Commonwealth Relations Department.
- Leslie Frank Hutchinson Goodwin, managing director, Bombay Company Ltd., Bombay.
- Major George Kenneth Graham, MB, ChB, Indian Medical Service, lately Civil Surgeon, Peshawar, North-West Frontier Province.
- Arthur Laurence Griffith, Indian Forest Service, Silvicultural Research Officer, Forest Research Institute, Dehra Dun.
- Major James Guthrie, MB, ChB, Indian Medical Service, Civil Surgeon, Tibet and Bhutan.
- Harry William Hale, Indian Police, Principal, Police Training School, Phillaur, Punjab.
- David Reece Charles Halford, Indian Civil Service, Secretary to the Government of Sind in the Finance Department.
- Percy Joseph Hanly, Superintending Engineer, Central Public Works Department, India.
- Francis Charles Harris, Section Master, Prince of Wales' Royal Indian Military College, Dehra Dun.
- Major Cornelius Jeffcott Hassett, MBE, Indian Medical Service, Civil Surgeon, New Delhi, India.
- Thomas Francis Hennessy, Manager, Punjab Cement Works Ltd., Wah, Attock District, Punjab.
- Cyril Edward Hewetson, Indian Forest Service, Divisional Forest Officer, Hoshaga-Ibad Division, Central Provinces and Berar.
- Frank Ernest Hitchin, MBE, Assistant Inspector-General of Prisons, Madras.
- Lieutenant-Colonel John Mandeville Hugo, Indian Army (Retired), Military Secretary to His Excellency the Governor of Bengal.
- Wilfred Humphrey, Indian Police, Deputy Director Intelligence, Government of India, Peshawar, North-West Frontier Province.
- John Parkyn Jeffcock, MIEE, Deputy Director-General, Civil Aviation (Airways & Administration), Government of India.
- Bernard Sinclair Jones, MBE, Mint Master, Lahore (officiating).
- Kenneth David-Jones, Director of Employment Exchanges and Statistics, India.
- Robert Faraquharson Keith, Indian Civil Service, Deputy Commissioner, Upper Sind Frontier District, Sind.
- Roland Marcus Julius Knaster, Senior Educational Officer in the Education Department Office of the High Commissioner for India in London.
- Maurice Prince Labouchardiere, Indian Police, Bombay Province.
- Courtenay Robert Latimer, Indian Political Service, Deputy Commissioner, Bannu District, North-West Frontier Province.
- Edward Henry Le Brocq, Indian Police, Deputy Inspector-General of Police, Bakarganj Range, Bengal.
- Robert William Lindsay, lately Executive Engineer, Port Blair.
- Lieutenant-Colonel James Mackie, Indian Service of Engineers, Superintending Engineer Development Circle, Bengal.
- Colonel John Dalrymple Calder Marshall, Director, Military Lands and Cantonments, India.
- Victor George Matthews, Indian Civil Service, Collector of Customs.
- Major Anthony Charles Ker Maunsell, Indian Political Service, Secretary to the Resident at Hyderabad.
- Susan Maynard (wife of Mr. R. de K. Maynard, CIE, General Manager, the Madras and Southern Mahratta Railway). For social and charitable services in Madras.
- Lieutenant-Colonel Basil John Devenish-Meares, Indian Army, Military Adviser, Punjab States Forces.
- Frederick William Aubrey Morris, Indian Civil Service, Collector and District Magistrate, Madras.
- Margaret Stewart Munday, lately Professor of Physiology, Lady Hardinge Medical College, Delhi.
- Commander (S) George Harry Nicholls, Royal Navy, Deputy Personal Secretary, to his Excellency the Viceroy.
- James Carstairs Niven, Commandant, Special Constabulary Force of Calcutta, Bengal.
- William Kennedy Orton, Transportation Manager, Bengal Nagpur Railway, Garden Reach, Kidderpore, Calcutta.
- Robert de la Condamine Ozanne, Indian Police, Deputy Inspector-General of Police, Western Range, Central Provinces and Berar.
- John Humphrey Hill Peppe, Joint Proprietor and Senior Manager, The Peppe Estates, Birdpur, District Basti, United Provinces, India.
- Alan Warwick Percy, Branch Manager, Burmah Shell Oil Storage & Distributing Company of India Ltd., Bombay.
- Stanley George Pick, MC, Chief Traffic Manager, Bombay, Baroda & Central India Railway, Bombay.
- Yelayudhan Pillai Narayana Pillai Parameswaran Pillai, Major General in, and General Officer Commanding, Travancore State Forces.
- Edward Broughton Pratt, Indian Police, District Superintendent of Police, Jubbulpore, Central Provinces and Berar.
- Maurice Douglas Pugh, Indian Police, Deputy Inspector-General, Additional Police, North West Frontier Province.
- Thomas Stott Pugh, District Manager, Madras Telephone District, Madras.
- John Mitchell Pye, Joint-Controller, Indian Tea Licensing Committee and Assistant Tea Controller for North India, Calcutta.
- Major Norman Ramsay, MBE, Indian Political Service, Secretary to the Resident in Mysore.
- George Massey Ratcliff, Indian Civil Service, Secretary to the Government of Bengal, Legislative Department.
- William Harold Adrian Rich, Indian Police, Senior Superintendent of Police, Lahore, Punjab.
- John Robertson, Secretary and Treasurer, Imperial Bank of India, Bombay.
- Leslie Cyril Frederick Robins, Indian Police, Superintendent of Police, Lucknow, United Provinces.
- Eric Maxfield Rogers, Indian Police, Assistant Inspector-General of Police, Criminal Investigation Department, United Provinces.
- Lawrence Walter Russell, Indian Police, Second Assistant to the Inspector-General of Police, Bihar.
- William Hanbury Saumarez Smith, MBE, Indian Civil Service, Deputy Secretary to His Excellency the Governor of Bengal.
- Charles Peter Scott, Indian Civil Service, Assistant Private Secretary to His Excellency the Viceroy.
- Henry Donald Mortimer Scott, Indian Police, Senior Superintendent of Police in Baluchistan.
- Lieutenant-Colonel Walter Scott, Indian Medical Service, Civil Surgeon, Central Provinces and Berar.
- Major Arthur Manus Sheridan, Indian Medical Service, Civil Surgeon, Lucknow, United Provinces.
- William Shirreffs, Head Accountant, Imperial Bank of India, Madras.
- Major Samuel Shone, Indian Medical Service, Superintendent, King George Hospital, and Professor of Medicine, Andhra Medical College, Vizagapatam, Madras.
- Sidney Smith, Officiating Chief Operating Superintendent, South Indian Railway, Trichinopoiy.
- Major Harold Stanislaus Smithwick, Indian Medical Service, Bombay Province.
- Archibald Adams Smyth, Superintending Engineer, Public Works Department, Madras.
- Norman Storr, Indian Civil Service, Registrar of the Federal Court of India.
- John Francis Gaskell Sykes, Indian Civil Service, lately Development Secretary to the Financial Commissioners, and Deputy Secretary to the Government of the Punjab in the Development Department.
- Stuart Fryer Tarlton, Chief Mining Engineer, Messrs. Bird & Co., and Messrs. Helgers & Co., Jharia (District Dhanbad), Bihar.
- Anthony Rylands Thomas, Indian Service of Engineers, Executive Engineer, Ahmednagar, Bombay.
- Owen Rufus Tucker, Chief Operating Superintendent, East Indian Railway, Calcutta.
- Sarah Muriel Grace Sigrid Watson, MBE.
- Harold Whipp, MBE, Superintending Engineer, Public Health Engineering Department, Bihar.
- George Herbert Anderson Wood, Director of Railway Audit, India.
- Meredith Worth, Indian Political Service, Secretary, Development Department, Baluchistan.
- Wilfred John Younie, Senior Partner, Price, Waterhouse Peat & Co., Bengal.

Honorary Officers

- Albert George Caulker, Paramount Chief of Bumpe Moyamba District, Sierra Leone.
- Theodore Krikorian, Senior Paymaster, Department of Police and Prisons, Palestine.
- Samuel Layinka Ayodeji Manuwa, MD (Ed.), ChB, FRCS, Specialist in the Medical Department, Nigeria.
- Professor Leon Ary Mayer, PhD. For public services in Palestine.
- Che Mohamed Hashim bin Dato Di Wangsa, State Secretary, Trengganu, Malayan Union.
- Timothy Adeola Odutola. For public services in Nigeria.

==== Member of the Order of the British Empire (MBE) ====
Military Division

Royal Navy

- Signal Lieutenant Alfred Edgar Brown, (Retired).
- Wardmaster Lieutenant Harry Douglas Cluer, (Retired).
- Acting Shipwright Lieutenant-Commander John Culf.
- Lieutenant (E) Robert William Davies, DSC.
- First Officer Colleen Fletcher, Women's Royal Naval Service.
- Lieutenant-Commander (L) William Hough, (Retired).
- Mr. Edward Moore, Commissioned Gunner.
- Temporary Lieutenant-Commander (Sp.) William Carruthers Murray, Royal Naval Volunteer Reserve.
- Mr. Ernest George Joseph Pankhurst, Warrant Recruiter.
- Lieutenant (E) Maurice Victor Waldron, DSC.
- Lieutenant (Acting Captain) Anthony Patrick Willasey-Wilsey, Royal Marines.
- Mr. Frederick Edwin Woods, Temporary Acting Commissioned Cookery Officer.
- Acting Lieutenant-Commander George Peebles Frazier, Royal Indian Navy (dated 14 August 1947).

Army

- Lieutenant Kenneth Roy Adams (372229), Royal Army Ordnance Corps.
- Captain (Quartermaster) John Harry Favell Allen, (218910), The Royal Hampshire Regiment.
- Major Anthony James Arengo Arengo-Jones, (67137), The Gloucestershire Regiment.
- Captain (Quartermaster) William Ashworth, (137601), Corps of Royal Engineers.
- Captain (Quartermaster) George Bell (92181), Royal Army Service Corps.
- Captain (Quartermaster) Daniel Bonar (92821), The Highland Light Infantry (City of Glasgow Regiment).
- Major (temporary) John Bishop Borthwick, MB, FRCP (Edinburgh), (211720), Royal Army Medical Corps.
- Major (temporary) Geoffrey Frank Bovey, (356692), Royal Army Educational Corps.
- Lieutenant Charles Cochrane (136756), The Border Regiment.
- No. 812841 Warrant Officer Class I Arthur Croft, Royal Regiment of Artillery.
- Major (temporary) Percy George Devenish (102446), Intelligence Corps, Territorial Army Reserve of Officers.
- Captain (temporary) Robert Charles Frederick Eden (193404), Intelligence Corps.
- Major (temporary) Richard Newcome Fearns (181784), Royal Army Service Corps.
- Major Roy Thomson Fletcher, MD, (119618), Royal Army Medical Corps.
- Major (temporary) Cecil Ford (161376), The South Wales Borderers.
- No. 1407879 Warrant Officer Class I Arthur Charles Alfred James Ford, Royal Regiment of Artillery.
- Major (acting) William Donaldson Gibson, (286054), Army Cadet Force.
- Major Adam Loudon Gordon (63577), The Royal Norfolk Regiment.
- Major (Quartermaster) William Guy, MM, (62467), Royal Horse Guards.
- Senior Commander (temporary) Valerie Violet Haigh-Brown (211263), Auxiliary Territorial Service.
- Major (Quartermaster) Percy John Hanlon (69631), The Royal Sussex Regiment.
- Major (temporary) John Henderson, MC, (218978), Intelligence Corps.
- Captain (Quartermaster) Percy Frank Hussey (254014), Royal Regiment of Artillery.
- Major (temporary) Ian Archibald Jackson, MB, (135370), Royal Army Medical Corps.
- Captain (temporary) George Hamilton Jones (14080), Royal Regiment of Artillery, Reserve of Officers.
- Major (temporary) Victor Alfred Jupp (225008), Royal Electrical and Mechanical Engineers.
- Major (I.R.E.M.) Harry William Kenyon (64363), Corps of Royal Engineers.
- Major (temporary) John Frederick Lockwood (132553), Royal Regiment of Artillery.
- Major (temporary) Archibald Edward MacVean, (175181), Corps of Royal Engineers.
- Captain (Quartermaster) Redvers Marshall, (270733), The Devonshire Regiment.
- Captain (Assistant Paymaster) Charles Alfred Martin (115773), Royal Army Pay Corps.
- Major (temporary) Raymond Sidney Mayers, (218877), General List, Infantry.
- Major (temporary) Donald Bain McDonald (163986), Corps of Royal Engineers.
- Major Arthur Geoffrey Howard Moore (62633), The Northamptonshire Regiment.
- Major (temporary) John William Talwin Morris (69919), Royal Regiment of Artillery.
- Major (acting) George Herbert Morrow, (275190), Army Cadet Force.
- No. 1869609 Warrant Officer Class I John Ray Mortlock, Corps of Royal Engineers.
- Senior Commander (temporary) Prudence Pamela Perkins (211357), Auxiliary Territorial Service.
- No. 543385 Warrant Officer Class I Ronald James Read, 4th Queen's Own Hussars, Royal Armoured Corps.
- No. 1417618 Warrant Officer Class I (A.C.) Reginald Anthony Robinson, Royal Regiment of Artillery.
- Captain (Quartermaster) Wallace Rowland, MM, (89018), The King's Royal Rifle Corps.
- Major Cyril Edwin Seaford (199551), Royal Electrical and Mechanical Engineers.
- Major (temporary) Geoffrey Wingfield Shepherd (74564), Corps of Royal Engineers.
- Major (temporary) (Quartermaster) Henry Ernest Simmons (128893), The Northamptonshire Regiment.
- Major (Quartermaster) Leonard Stewart (72067), Corps of Royal Military Police.
- Major Thomas Stibbs (169425), Royal Corps of Signals.
- Captain (Quartermaster) George Richard Stonestreet (143635), General List.
- Major (temporary) Edward Manning Tobin (226760), Royal Armoured Corps.
- Major (temporary) Philip Walsh (74707) Royal Tank Regiment, Royal Armoured Corps.
- Major (temporary) Harold William Way (160945), Corps of Royal Engineers.
- No. S/5626112 Warrant Officer Class II Richard Wedge, Royal Army Service Corps.
- Major Stanley John Williams (58792), Royal Corps of Signals.
- Major (temporary) Alexander James Wilson, MC, (180730), The Rifle Brigade (Prince Consort's Own).
- Major (temporary) Eric Wisdom (151300), Royal Army Ordnance Corps.
- Junior Commander (temporary) Marie Maughan Wolf (211440), Auxiliary Territorial Service.
- Lieutenant William Henry lies Woodcock (291953), Royal Army Ordnance Corps.
- Major (temporary) Ernest Harrison Gilmore Young (155182), Royal Regiment of Artillery.
- Captain (Temporary Major) Leslie Claude Balmer, 4th Battalion, The Burma Regiment.
- Captain (Temporary Major) Robert Michael Carr, DFC, Headquarters, Burma Command.
- Captain (Temporary Major) John Hunter, The Burma Regiment.
- Captain (Temporary Major) Cecil Arthur Stevens, No. 1 GT Company, Burma Army Service Corps.
- Captain (Temporary Major) Alfred Richard Thair, Burma Supply Company, Burma Army Service Corps.
- Captain Abdul Rahman bin Abdul Aziz, Singapore Volunteer Corps.
- Warrant Officer Class II Manassah Nat Rakusen, Hong Kong Volunteer Defence Corps.
- Captain Chee Juay Poh, LRCP&S (Edin.), LRFP&S (Glas.), LMSSA, Medical Officer, Singapore Volunteer Corps.
- Captain Wijaya Raja Singham Nalliah, Ceylon Light Infantry.

Dated 14 August 1947

- Major (Temporary Lieutenant-Colonel) Frank Adams, Indian Army, 14th Punjab Regiment.
- W/S Captain (Temporary Major) John Joseph Barron, Royal Indian Engineers.
- W/S Captain (Temporary Major) Thomas Battersby, Indian Army Corps of Clerks, attached G.H.Q., India.
- Captain (W/S Major) Temporary Lieutenant-Colonel Patrick Claude Keays-Byrne, 14th Punjab Regiment, attached Tactical Administrative School, Dehra Dun.
- Major (Temporary Lieutenant-Colonel) Robert Groves, Quartering Directorate, Quartermaster-General's Branch, G.H.Q., India.
- Major Archibald Walter Harding, Army in India Reserve of Officers, attached Royal Indian Army Service Corps.
- W/S Major Walter Youell Leggett, Indian Army Corps of Clerks, attached G.H.Q., India.
- W/S Major Temporary Lieutenant-Colonel John Haines Mainprize, attached Indian Army Ordnance Corps.
- Major John Northmore Stevens, Indian Army Corps of Clerks, Deputy Assistant Quartermaster-General, Headquarters, Southern Command, India.
- Major (Temporary Lieutenant-Colonel) Nigel John Buchanan Stuart, Frontier Force Rifles, attached 5th Indian Division.
- Captain (Temporary Major) Desmond George-Barry Badham-Thornhill, Indian Army, 2nd Punjab Regiment.

Royal Air Force

- Squadron Leader Edward Samuel Robert Coakes (45194).
- Squadron Leader William Alfred George Goldsworthy (11014), (Retired).
- Acting Squadron Leader James Rose Watson Adamson (64175), RAF Volunteer Reserve.
- Acting Squadron Leader John Harold Parker Oxspring (64679), RAF Volunteer Reserve.
- Flight Lieutenant Thomas Harvey, MB, ChB, (203369), RAF Volunteer Reserve.
- Flight Lieutenant Hugh Esmor Huxley (159192), RAF Volunteer Reserve.
- Flight Lieutenant Frederick Arthur Vernon Stoltz (61593).
- Acting Flight Lieutenant William George Carr (199796).
- Acting Flight Lieutenant Mervyn Owen (56317).
- Warrant Officer Leslie Ault (511938).
- Warrant Officer Sydney Alfred John De Souza (238327).
- Warrant Officer Arthur Evans (508586).
- Warrant Officer Ralph Edward Hartley (590578).
- Warrant Officer Thomas Horsfall (338124).
- Warrant Officer George William Arthur Lyddiatt (518181).
- Warrant Officer William Charles Sheppard (357040).
- Warrant Officer George (William Sirman (516037).
- Acting Flight Officer Christine Charlotte Harvey (7251), Women's Auxiliary Air Force.
- Section Officer Gwendoline Mary Lamb (6159), Women's Auxiliary Air Force.
- Acting Matron May Eliza Ball, ARRC, (5015), Princess Mary's Royal Air Force Nursing Service.

Civil Division

- Ernest Frederick Abbiss, Staff Officer, Air Ministry.
- Albert Ernest Adams, Chief Designer, Scophony Ltd.
- Jane Stear Alexander. For public services in Featherstone, West Riding of Yorkshire.
- William Alexander, Farmer, Eynsford, Kent. For services in the design of new and useful agricultural machines.
- Rupert Ellis Alford, Manager of English Flax Ltd., Devizes.
- Harry Allard, Skipper of the Fishing Trawler Bellona, Consolidated Fisheries Ltd., Grimsby.
- Everina Reeves Allen, vice-president, Belfast Savings Council.
- Frank Raine-Allen, lately Control Officer, Grade II, Control Commission for Germany (British Element).
- Hubert John Allwright, AFRAeS, Scientific Officer, Ministry of Supply.
- John Anderson, Chief Public Assistance Officer, Aberdeen.
- Observer Lieutenant Henry Austin, lately chief equipment officer, Royal Observer Corps.
- Sydney George Bailey, Secretary, Cake and Biscuit Manufacturers' War Time Alliance.
- Frederick Edward Baker, Works Manager, Hounsells (Bridport) Ltd.
- Katharine Stella Baker. For services to the Art for the People Travelling Exhibitions, British Institute of Adult Education.
- Horace Alfred Baldwin, Senior Staff Officer, Ministry of Transport.
- Leslie Banks, Pensions Officer, St. Dunstan's.
- Leonard James Bate, First Class Officer, Ministry of Labour and National Service.
- Edwin Thomas Bateman, Superintendent, Computations, Trigonometrical and Levelling Division, Ordnance Survey Office.
- Annie Bates, lately Executive Officer, Ministry of Pensions.
- James Gordon Bates, Assistant Drainage Engineer, Ministry of Agriculture and Fisheries.
- The Reverend Canon Aulbrey Baxter, Chaplain to the Chester Royal Infirmary.
- Jack Douglas Beebee, Clerk to the Licensing Authorities, South Eastern Area, Ministry of Transport.
- Dora Behrens, Deputy-Chairman, Bradford Savings Committee.
- Alfred Harry Bell, Senior Experimental Officer, National Physical Laboratory, Department of Scientific and Industrial Research.
- Margaret Bell, District Nurse, Blackwood District, Nursing Association, Lanarkshire.
- Adam Bennett, General Secretary, National Union of Stove Grate and General Metal Workers.
- Thomas Bevan. For public services in Carmarthenshire.
- Peter Henderson Beveridge, Superintendent, Criminal Investigation Department, Metropolitan Police Force.
- Horace Jerome Bingham, Station Superintendent, Poole, British Overseas Airways Corporation.
- Captain Alwyn Edgar Biscoe, Chief Secretary, Royal Life Saving Society.
- Samuel Charles Bishop, Senior Executive Officer, Ministry of Supply.
- Peter Bisset, Honorary Secretary, Kincardineshke Savings Committee.
- Ernest Blaikley, FRSA, Assistant, Imperial War Museum.
- Ernest Sidney Blake, Secretary (Eastern Region), National Federation of Building Trades Operatives.
- Percy Charles Blatcher, Chief Registrar, HM Treasury.
- Ann Blyth, lately District Nurse, Meldon and Hartburn, Northumberland.
- William Edward Joseph Bolger, Honorary Secretary, County Antrim Savings Committee.
- Joseph Roy Bottom, Senior Executive Officer, Ministry of Transport.
- Thomas Bowman, Higher Executive Officer, Ministry of National Insurance.
- Archibald Claude Bridge, Production Engineer and Works Manager, Crittall-Luxfer Aluminium Windows Ltd., Colwick.
- Thomas William Brown, Chief of Central Materials Inspection Bureau, Derby, London, Midland and Scottish Railway.
- Bertrand Frederick Brueton, ARIBA, Senior Planning Officer to the Bristol Corporation.
- George Thomas Bullock, President, Bristol Printing and Kindred Trades Federation.
- George William Bundock, Chief Clerk of Works, Cambridge, Ministry of Works.
- Alfred Charles Button, Accountant, Ministry of Education.
- George Edward Camm, Senior Executive Officer, Board of Trade.
- Harry James Capewell, Senior Executive Officer, Passport Office.
- Arthur Archibald Chalmers, Assistant Fire Force Commander, Headquarters, National Fire Service.
- George Maredydd Chantrill, Chief Labour Officer, Worcester War Agricultural Executive Committee.
- Alexander Francis Chase, Staff Officer, Ministry of Transport.
- Henry Charles Cheater, Clerk, Special Class, Ministry of Works.
- James Christie, Secretary, Norfolk War Agricultural Executive Committee.
- Dorothy Hilda Chubb, Assistant Establishments Officer, British Iron and Steel Federation.
- John Clark, Colliery Manager, Fifeshire.
- John Prosser Clark, Assistant Area Organiser, Scottish Savings Committee.
- Raymund Montague Clark, Senior Assistant, Patent Office, Board of Trade.
- Harold William Clarke, Senior Executive Officer, Board of Trade.
- William Joseph Coaley, Secretary, Main Line Railway Canteens' Association,
- Edith Cockcroft, JP, chairman, Halifax Standing Conference of Women's Organisations.
- Jean Holmes Copeland, Honorary Secretary, Dromore Local Savings Committee.
- Harry Albert Cox, Head of Branch, Tithe Redemption Commission.
- Elsie Craik, Senior Executive Officer, Assistance Board.
- George Crawford, Executive Officer, General Post Office, Scotland.
- Gerald Graham Lee Cruickshank, Chief Commissioner, National Savings Committee.
- Arthur John Cushing, lately Manager, Borough Employment Exchange, Ministry of Labour and National Service.
- Margaret Lamb Dalgleish, Higher Executive Officer, Ministry of Food.
- George Daly, Staff Officer, General Post Office.
- James Davenport, lately District Locomotive Superintendent, Bank Hall, Liverpool, London, Midland and Scottish Railway Company.
- Bernard Jack Davies, Senior Executive Officer, Ministry of Education.
- Ernest Charles Davies, Superintending Clerk, General Register Office.
- Margaret Mary Davies, Deputy Governor, HM Prison Holloway.
- Herbert Davoile, DCM, Executive Officer, Juvenile Employment Committee, Coventry.
- William Joseph Desmoulins, Senior Staff Officer, Ministry of Food.
- Margaret Sarah Draper, Staff Officer, Ministry of Pensions.
- Cecil Nicholas Drew, District Inspector, Royal Ulster Constabulary.
- Henrietta Muriel Newton Driver, chairman and Founder, English Speaking Officers' Club, London.
- Harry Dudley, Liaison Officer, Pottery and Glass, Ministry of Works.
- Janet Wilson Dunbar, Supervisor of Clerical Staff, Wages Department, South of Scotland Wholesale Meat Supply Association.
- Mary Duncan, Chief Superintendent of Typists, Ministry of Health.
- William Robert Duncan. For services as Production Superintendent, David Brown & Sons (Huddersfield) Ltd.
- Alfred Thomas Duncombe, Column Officer, No. 40 (Wolverhampton) Fire Force, National Fire Service.
- Ernest Alfred Dunham, JP, managing director, Crisswell's Garage, Newmarket. For services to the Ministry of Transport.
- Richard Reginald Dutton, Civilian Staff Officer, War Office.
- Sidney John Eardley, AMIMechE, Regional Fuel Engineer, North Eastern Region, Ministry of Fuel and Power.
- William George Nickels Easterbrook, Proprietor, W. G. Nickels & Co., Stockport.
- Harold Edridge, Lately Deputy Director of Salvage and Recovery, Chesterfield.
- John Shuttleworth Elliott, Assistant Divisional Operating Manager (Motive Power), Crewe, London, Midland and Scottish Railway Company.
- Wilfred Howe Elliott, Deputy Principal, Ministry of Agriculture, Northern Ireland.
- William Thomas Elston, Superintendent of Production, Hydrographic Supplies Establishment, Admiralty.
- Lieutenant (S) Charles James Wahab Enwright, Royal Navy (Retired), Book Officer, The Nore, Admiralty.
- Stanley Arthur Wesley Evans, Staff Officer, Air Ministry.
- William Henry Everett, Higher Executive Officer, Ministry of Civil Aviation.
- Leslie Ivan Farren, Technical Assistant, General Electric Company Ltd., Wembley.
- John Hayden Fitton, Higher Executive Officer, Ministry of Supply.
- Senator Henry Fleming, JP. For services as Irish Auditor for the Boilermakers, Iron and Steel Shipbuilders' Society.
- George Howard Forsyte, DSc, MIMarE, MIMechE. For services as Principal Engineer Surveyor for Research, Lloyd's Register of Shipping.
- John Howard Fox, JP. For public service in Somerset.
- Dundas Joseph Dick Frame, District Chairman, Toc H, Belfast.
- Thomas Henry Gale, Honorary Local Fuel Overseer, Abertillery Urban District Council.
- Muriel Winifred Gibbs, Head of Section, Children's Department, Women's Voluntary Services.
- Samuel Tonge Goggins, JP, chairman, Ashton-under-Lyne Employment Committee.
- Ernest Charles Gough, chairman, Deptford Savings Committee.
- Alderman Arthur William Green, JP, chairman, King George Hospital, Ilford.
- Geoffrey Taylor Greenhalgh, Senior Captain, British European Airways Corporation.
- Jessie Isabella Gregor, Lady Convener, Forces Social Centre, Perth.
- Kathleen Griffiths, Office Secretary of the Radium Commission.
- Emma Groves. For public services in Keighley.
- James Jackson Grundy, lately Distribution Manager, Alkali and General Chemicals Divisions, Imperial Chemical Industries Ltd.
- Horace Guerrier, Machinery and Cultivations Officer, Surrey War Agricultural Executive Committee.
- William Snowdon Hall, JP, Vice-chairman, Durham District Miners' Welfare Committee.
- Sarah Frances Theodora (Doris) Hanna, assistant director, Soldiers', Sailors' and Airmen's Families Association, Middle East Land Forces.
- Dorothy Margaret Vernon Harcourt, Leader in Charge, YMCA King George's Club for Officers, London.
- Mary Margaretta Embrey Harrison, employed in a Department of the Foreign Office.
- Gilbert Harknett Harvey, Honorary Port Fishery Officer for Leigh-on-Sea.
- Edward Richard Hayter, Assistant Controller, Control Commission for Germany (British Element).
- Edith Frances Heaven, Controller of Catholic Women's League, British Army of the Rhine.
- Phyllis Hennings, Member, Northampton Juvenile Employment Committee.
- Walter James Henton, AMInstI, District Superintendent, (South East), Country Buses and Coaches, London Passenger Transport Board.
- Ethel Margaret Hill, Chairman of the Women's Auxiliary, North Eastern Division of the YMCA.
- Charles Henry Hinchcliffe, Manager, Bullcliffe Wood Colliery, Yorkshire.
- Phyllis Hirst, Senior Women's Welfare Supervisor, London Passenger Transport Board.
- Stanley Samuel Hirst, Clerk, Great Western Railway Company.
- John Martin Hogan, JP. For public services in Wellington, Shropshire.
- Mary Megan Holman, lately Outports Welfare Officer, Admiralty.
- Francis Alexander Holmes, Assistant Chief of Police, Southern Railway Company.
- Henry William Holmes, Principal Civilian Staff Officer, War Office.
- Alfred Allman Hopwood, Farmer, Cheshire. Member of a District Committee of the War Agricultural Executive Committee.
- Annis Louisa Horne, Clerical Officer, Cabinet Office.
- Norah Horner, chairman, Stretford Savings Committee, Manchester.
- Edwin Henry Hounsell, Higher Executive Officer, Board of Inland Revenue.
- Thelma Gwendolen Hunt, Higher Executive Officer, Commonwealth Relations Office.
- Bertram Hunter, Staff Officer, Board of Trade.
- Harry Easdown Hutchins, Secretary, North Midland Regional Board for Industry, Board of Trade.
- Lancelot William Ibbotson, District Superintendent, Darlington, London and North Eastern Railway Company.
- Ernest William Irons, Senior Executive Officer, Ministry of Supply.
- William Irwin, Staff Officer, Ministry of Home Affairs, Northern Ireland.
- Ethel Grace James, Chief Superintendent of Typists, Contracts Department, General Post Office.
- Christiana Elizabeth Bayne-Jardine, County Organiser, Berkshire, Women's Land Army.
- Christine Cobban Jenkins. For services as Member of the Welfare Committee, Royal Air Force Station, Watchfield.
- Ruth Rogers Jolliffe, Matron, Wingfield Morris Orthopaedic Hospital, Headington, Oxford.
- Norman William Isom Jones, AMIEE, Chief D.C. Designer, Maudsley Ltd., Dursley.
- Richard Llewelyn Jones, JP, Member of the Cardigan War Agricultural Executive Committee.
- Marjorie Jose, Clerical Officer, Foreign Office.
- John Benjamin Kennedy, District Officer, HM Coastguard, Ministry of Transport.
- Alfred John Kent, Senior Staff Officer, Board of Inland Revenue.
- Sidney Alfred Kettley, Manager, Hounslow Government Training Centre, Ministry of Labour and National Service.
- Ethel Maureen King, Honorary Matron, Glendhu Children's Hospital, Co. Down.
- Edith Mary Kirkham, Assistant Home Sister, Walton Hospital, Liverpool.
- Arthur Johnston Lacey, Staff Officer, Ministry of Works.
- Harry Lager, MM, Senior Staff Officer, Air Ministry.
- John Henry Starkey Lager, Civil Assistant and Accountant, Air Ministry.
- Donald Lamont, Surveyor, Board of Customs and Excise.
- Julia Lance, Divisional President, Norfolk Branch, British Red Cross Society.
- Lewis Norman Law, Civilian Workshpp Officer, Class I, Royal Electrical and Mechanical Engineers.
- Eileen Leach, JP, Liaison Officer and Head of Supplies Department, Women's Voluntary Services.
- Norman Howard Leaker, Secretary to the Lord Mayor of Birmingham.
- Leonard Edward Le Burn, Staff Officer, Commonwealth Relations Office.
- Councillor John Henry Lewis, JP, District House Coal Officer, Biimingham.
- Albert Edward Littlewood, Training Officer, Williamthorpe Colliery, Chesterfield.
- John Lomax, Civil Assistant to the Director of Naval Ordnance, Admiralty.
- Frank Winstanley Longworth, Manager, Camden Town Employment Exchange, Ministry of Labour and National Service.
- Ella Forsyth Lyell, Assistant County Director, County of Angus, British Red Cross Society.
- Muriel Lynn, Chief Superintendent of Typists, Ministry of Agriculture and Fisheries.
- Phyllis Kathleen Lyons, Higher Clerical Officer, Ministry of Town and Country Planning.
- Isobel Taylor McAinsh, Senior Staff Officer, Ministry of Fuel and Power.
- John MacCalman, Superintendent and Deputy Chief Constable, Argyllshire Constabulary.
- John McGregor, Senior Executive Officer, Scottish Education Department.
- Donald Mackay, MC, MA, Headmaster, Viewforth Public School, Kirkcaldy.
- Catherine McMenemy, Honorary Secretary, Drumpark Special School Savings Committee, Bargeddie, Lanarkshire.
- Frederick William Malby, Assistant Controller, Board of Trade.
- Margaret Malim, Headmistress, Stockton-on-Tees, Deaf County School.
- Isabel Manson. For services as Chairman of the Women's Land Army Sub-Committee of the Agricultural Executive Committee for Aberdeen and Ellon.
- Frank Dixon Marshall, Honorary Secretary, Yorkshire Air Training Corps Association.
- William Sidney Mason, Senior Staff Officer, General Post Office.
- Douglas Edward Masson, Senior Representative of HM Stationery Office in the Middle East.
- Joseph Frederick Anthony Mawdsley, Regional Maintenance and Certifying Officer, North Western Region, Ministry of Transport.
- Alderman Douglas Archibald Alfred Merry, chairman, Finchley Local Committee of Nos. 393 and 1825 Squadrons, Air Training Corps.
- Charles William Midgley. For public services in Dewsbury and district, West Riding of Yorkshire.
- John William Mildon, Port Food Movement Officer, Cardiff, Ministry of Food.
- Alexander Watson Miller. For services as Secretary, West Green Approved Society.
- James Thornton Morgan, Higher Executive Officer, Department of Health for Scotland.
- John Vernon Morley, Clerk to the River Severn Catchment Board.
- Cherry Morris, Almoner, National Hospital for Nervous Diseases, London.
- Cyril George Morris, chairman, Wrexham and District Savings Committee.
- Thomas Edward Murray, Senior Executive Officer (now Principal), Ministry of Health.
- Henry Maurice Myers, Production Manager, Imperial Chemical Industries Ltd., Metals Division.
- Donald Drummond Mynott, Director, Autos (Tiptree) Ltd., Essex.
- Rhoda Mary-Linda Needs (Mrs. Olden), Higher Executive Officer, Central Office of Information.
- Harry Boswell Norris, Senior Executive Officer, Ministry of Civil Aviation.
- Lieutenant-Colonel Rudolf Ord, JP, managing director, Satterthwaite & Co. Formerly Chairman, Council of Leather and Grindery Merchants' Associations of Great Britain.
- Thomas Whyte Pagan, Works Manager, R. & J. Garroway Ltd., Glasgow.
- Flight-Lieutenant Cecil Lawrence Pashley, AFC, Chief Instructor, South Coast Flying Club, Shoreham.
- David John Patten, Undermanager, Cwmtillery Colliery, Monmouthshire.
- Harold Russell Paul, Member, Building Industries Distributors Advisory Committee in Wales.
- Robert Alexander Perry, Collector of Taxes, Belfast, Board of Inland Revenue.
- Guy Alan Pillinger, Regional Coal Officer, South Western Region, Ministry of Fuel and Power.
- Herbert Allan Victor Piper, assistant director of Finance, War Damage Commission.
- Helen Symon Pirie, Food Executive Officer and National Registration Officer, Arbroath, Ministry of Food.
- George Gordon Pringle, MM, Higher Executive Officer, Department of Agriculture for Scotland.
- Herbert Rainford, Senior Experimental Officer, Electrical Testing Station, Buxton, Ministry of Fuel and Power.
- Arthur Lincoln Ralphes, Town Clerk, Borough of Conway.
- Pamela Susannah Randall, Officer, Grade II, Foreign Office (German Section).
- Livingstone Albert Randerson, Engineer and Surveyor to the Swale Rural District Council.
- Gladys Ranscombe, Superintendent of Typists, Chemical Defence Experimental Station, Ministry of Supply.
- Eva Jessie Rice, Clerical Officer, Office of HM Procurator-General and Treasury Solicitor.
- Dorothy Kate Richard, Travelling Organiser, North Midland Region, Women's Voluntary Services.
- James Robertson, Principal Civilian Staff Officer, War Office.
- Frederick John Robinson, ARIC, MIChemE, Director and General Works Manager, Bakelite Ltd.
- George Albert Rogers, Senior Staff Officer, Admiralty.
- William Munro Ross, Staff Assistant to the Divisional General Manager, Scottish Area, London & North Eastern Railway Company.
- Sidney George Russ, Honorary Secretary, Salisbury Savings Committee.
- Alma Doris Rutter, Clerical Officer, Burma Office.
- Alfred James Ryan, MIEE, AMIMechE, lately Chief Electrical and Mechanical Engineer, Corporation of Hastings.
- Henry Saunders, Major, Salvation Army, British Red Shield Services.
- Henry William Savidge, Senior Executive Officer, Home Office.
- George Arthur Sawbridge, Manager, Naval Shop, Coventry Gauge & Tool Company Ltd.
- Leslie Caie Scott, Accountant, Ministry of Labour and National Service.
- Arthur Sidebottom, lately Head of Costings Department, Cotton Control.
- Major Herbert William Shelly, Officer in Charge, Message Control, Foreign Office (German Section).
- Norah Elizabeth Skrimshire, Senior Staff Officer, Ministry of Agriculture and Fisheries.
- Lieutenant Colonel Alexander Slater, MICE, (Retired), Deputy Commander, Royal Engineers, Shorncliffe.
- Edward Smith, Senior Executive Officer, Ministry of Pensions.
- Sidney Walter Smith, Deputy Chief Accountant, Colonial Office.
- William Smith, Secretary, Scottish Fertilizers Distribution Committee.
- Mabel Alice Sparks, Higher Executive Officer, Ministry of National Insurance.
- Charles David Stanier, General Secretary, National Union of Flint Glassworkers.
- John Hunter Stewart, Assistant Superintendent, Waterguard Department, Board of Customs and Excise.
- Walter Stoneman, Portrait Photographer and Lecturer. For services to the National Portrait Gallery.
- Edith Emily Strachan, Chief Supervisor, Regional Director's Office, London Postal Region, General Post Office.
- Arthur John Sullivan, Senior Executive Officer, Land Registry.
- Norman Tarttelin, Superintendent, Lincolnshire Constabulary.
- Edward Taylor, Undermanager, Amingon Colliery, Tamworth.
- Edward Taylor, JP, chairman, Bath Savings Committee.
- James Tecey, Factory Inspector, Northampton District, Ministry of Labour and National Service.
- John William Thomas, Senior Inspector, Clothing Inspectorate, Ministry of Supply.
- William Edgar Wenallt Thomas, Manager, Gloucester Employment Exchange, Ministry of Labour and National Service.
- David Tipper, Headmaster, Morchard Bishop Voluntary Primary School, Devon.
- Archibald Kirkwood Todd, Honorary Secretary, Falkirk Savings Committee.
- Sidney Alfred Tompkins. For services as Deputy Controller, Navy, Army and Air Force Institutes, Western Europe.
- Rachel Janet Trant, JP, Women's Land Army member of the Montgomery War Agricultural Executive Committee,
- Harry William Horatio Hawkesford Treadwell, Member, Employers' Side, Boot and Shoe Repairing Wages Council.
- Margaret Gladys Triggs, Head of Services Welfare Department, Women's Voluntary Services.
- Marie Trimble. For public services in County Fermanagh.
- Frederick James Tucknott, Chief Statistical Officer, National Smallbore Rifle Association.
- George Frederick Tyler, FCII, chairman, Ilford Wing Committee, Air Training Corps.
- Alma Gardyne Uffindell, Higher Clerical Officer, Board of Trade.
- Beatrice Vint, Headmistress, Blenheim County Infants' School, Leeds.
- Councillor Ulric Bertram Walmsley, chairman, Chelsea Savings Committee.
- Mary Walsh, Senior Sister, Royal Ordnance Factory, Chorley.
- Reginald Basil Webb, Chief Clerk, Town Clerk's Department, Westminster City Council.
- Ivy Dickinson Webber, Higher Executive Officer, Home Office.
- Charles Anthony Welch, Senior Executive Officer, Ministry of National Insurance.
- Sidney Whincup, ASAA, Secretary, National Service Hostels Corporation.
- Reginald Whitworth. For welfare services to the Post Office in Sheffield.
- Robert Roger Whyte, AMIMechE, Assistant Superintendent, Gas Turbine Department, Metropolitan-Vickers Electrical Company Ltd.
- Christopher Watson Willcox, Deputy Principal Inspection Officer, Ministry of Supply.
- Gladys May Willder, Health Visitor, Liverpool County Borough.
- John Richard Williams, Secretary, Civil Service Sanatorium Society.
- Owen Medwyn Williams, Secretary, Local Price Regulation Committee for South Wales, Board of Trade.
- George Edward Williamson, Chief Managing Clerk, Solicitors Department, New Scotland Yard.
- Henry Wolfson, Senior Research Chemist, Valve Research Laboratories, Standard Telephones and Cables Ltd., Ilminster.
- Harold George Woodbery, Higher Executive Officer, Ministry of Defence.
- Henry Charles Wooderson, lately Senior Shipping Assistant, Ministry of Transport.
- Ruth Woodhouse, Army Welfare Officer, Dorsetshire, Hon. Junior Commander, Auxiliary Territorial Service.
- Ada Anna Woodman, Superintendent Health Visitor, East Ham County Borough.
- Charles Ernest Worthington, Executive Engineer, Northern Ireland Region, General Post Office.
- Captain Thomas William Yarnell, Honorary Treasurer, Northern Ireland Area, British Legion.
- Hugh Young, Head Postmaster, Warrington, Lancashire.
- Phyllis Kitty Hodder Young, Head of Old Peoples Welfare Department, Women's Voluntary Services.
- Walter Hollis Adams, British Vice-Consul at San Francisco.
- Maitre Robert Francis John Ange Borg, British, subject resident in Egypt.
- Elizabeth Galbraith Bradshaw, lately Private Secretary to His Majesty's Consul-General at São Paulo.
- Marjorie Henrietta Brown, attached to a Department of the Foreign Office.
- Cecil James Bunbury, Head of Information Department, His Majesty's Legation in Havana.
- Stanley William Coomes, Clerk at His Majesty's Legation at Bucharest.
- Frederick William Cresswell, British Vice-Consul at Rotterdam.
- Gower George Gautray, British subject resident in Algeria.
- George Alexander Glass, Chief Public Health Inspector, Sudan Government.
- John Henry Hall, Chief Hydrographical Surveyor, Basra Port Directorate.
- Amelia Hammersley, British subject until recently resident in the United States of America.
- Henry Vincent Harty, Clerk at His Majesty's Embassy in Ankara.
- Reuben John Llewellyn, Acting Chief Engineer, Basra Port Directorate.
- Ernest Main, Deputy Head of Information Department, His Majesty's Embassy in Cairo.
- Charles Richard Wilson Montagu, lately Temporary Secretary, at His Majesty's Consulate-General at Batavia.
- Isobel Laura Nation, lately Head Clerk at His Majesty's Consulate at Seattle.
- Charles Sidney Palmer, Archivist at His Majesty's Embassy in Prague.
- Samuel Stuart Pennington, British subject resident in Argentina.
- Margaret Hope Pilkington. For services in Greece with the Guide International Service (G.I.S.)
- John Kenneth Reuterdahl, Third Secretary at His Majesty's Embassy at Stockholm.
- Jean Margaret Riley, Captain, Women's Transport Service (First Aid Nursing Yeomanry). For services in South-East Asia prior to 2 September 1945.
- William Anthony Thomas Sowden, until recently Second Secretary (Commercial) at His Majesty's Embassy in Cairo. (Now First Secretary (Commercial) at His Majesty's Embassy in Rio de Janeiro.)
- Cynthia Margaret Stephenson. For services in South-East Asia prior to 2 September 1945.
- Senga Anbuthnot Todd, Captain, Women's Transport Service (First Aid Nursing Yeomanry). For services in South-East Asia prior to 2 September 1945.
- Manoel Walker, British subject resident in the Dominican Republic.
- Charles Euan Van Waterschoodt, British subject resident in Hayti.
- Lavinia Jane Graham-Weall, Captain, Women's Transport Service (First Aid Nursing Yeomanry). For services in South-East Asia prior to 2 September 1945.
- Minnie Lee White, British subject resident in Peru.
- William Nesbitt Wilson, Senior Examiner, Passport Control Office, New York.
- Norman Irving Archibald, Principal, Lerotholi Technical School, Basutoland.
- John Butt, Collector of Customs, Class II, Newfoundland.
- Susan Adelaide Casson. For social welfare services, especially to mentally afflicted persons, in the State of Western Australia.
- Frances Diana Christison. For social welfare services in Clare, State of South Australia.
- Philip Crawshaw. For services rendered under the auspices of the Overseas League in connection with hospitality to visitors from overseas.
- Aubrey John Crocker, Controller of Telecommunications, Newfoundland.
- Donald Henry Cummings, Government Disposals Officer, Treasury, Southern Rhodesia.
- Alice Elizabeth Drakes, lately Matron, Rhodesian Children's Home, Salisbury, Southern Rhodesia.
- Hugh Fraser, formerly a Master at the Launceston Church Grammar School, State of Tasmania, for many years.
- Isaac Charles Goodyear, a school teacher in the Outports of Newfoundland.
- Hilda Mary Hanton, lately Matron, Memorial Hospital, Adelaide, State of South Australia.
- John Payne Luscombe, Auditor, Grade I, Department of the Comptroller and Auditor-General, Newfoundland.
- Louise McDonald, of Eiffel Flats, Southern Rhodesia. For social welfare services.
- Mary Stewart McKinlay, President, Women's Auxiliary of the Western Australian Executive of the Returned Sailors' Soldiers and Airmen's Imperial League of Australia.
- Elizabeth Moore, Matron, Merchant Navy Hospital, St. John's, Newfoundland.
- Thomas James Needham, of Marandellas, Southern Rhodesia. For public services.
- Robert Bright Norton, a prominent member of the Commercial Travellers and Warehousemen's Association, State of South Australia. For charitable services.
- Horatio Thomas Patrick, lately Travelling Engineer, Newfoundland Railway.
- Zoe May Richardson, of Hobart, State of Tasmania. For social welfare services.
- Gwendoline Beatrice Soames, Clerk, Grade II, Swaziland.
- Arthur Danesbury Towner, of Burnie, State of Tasmania. For philanthropic services.
- Frederick Jonas Davis, Superintendent of Traffic and Personal Assistant to the Chief Engineer, Telecommunications, Burma.
- Samuel Betton Gwynn, Divisional Engineer, Wireless, Burma.
- Patrick Warre Rathbone, Burma Civil Service (I), Secretary to the Financial Commissioner (Commerce), Burma.
- Wilfred John Stone, Bridge Engineer, Burma Railways.
- Arthur Julian Adolphus Archer. For public services in St. Vincent, Windward Islands.
- Jonathan Erastus Ayettey, Assistant Auditor, Gold Coast.
- Alexander Bentley, Senior Foreman, Public Works Department, Fiji.
- Thomas George Blount, Clerical Officer, Police Force Clerical Service, Palestine.
- Agnes Anna Brown de l'Hoste, Lady Bowie. For social services in Nyasaland.
- Francis Brett, Chief Junk Inspector, Harbour Department, Hong Kong.
- Margaret Venn Brown. For services to the Red Cross in the Bahamas.
- Francis John Bush, Assistant to the General Manager, Gold Coast Railway.
- William Howard Carter, District Inspector of Schools, Barbados.
- Edwin Emmanuel Cesar, Colonial Police Service, Deputy Commissioner of Police, Mauritius.
- Thomas Ambrose De Mel. For services to the tea industry in Ceylon.
- Sheik Feroze-Ud-Din, Office Assistant, Tanganyika.
- Saravanamuthu Eliatamby, lately Financial Assistant, Customs Department, Malayan Union.
- Robert Ewart Gabourel, Assistant Colonial Secretary, British Honduras.
- Demang Haji Abdul Ghani bin Haji Abdul Manan, JP, lately Senior Headman, Malayan Union.
- Charles James Gomez, Collector of Revenue, Gibraltar.
- Harold Gilkison Gray, Press Censor, Palestine.
- George Mathieson Hardie, Government Printer, Sierra Leone.
- Cecil William Hodges, Colonial Audit Service, Auditor, Windward Islands.
- Anna Caroline Jane Hollar, Assistant Teacher, Wolmer's Boys' School, Jamaica.
- Constance Mary Hornby. In charge of the Church Missionary Society Schools, Kigezi, Uganda.
- Puthenvelil Mathai Joseph, MB, BS, Medical Officer, Seychelles Hospital, Seychelles.
- Angus Kerr, Chief Underground Manager of the Nigerian Government Collieries.
- Alfred Joseph Khayat, Acting District Officer, Finance, Jaffa, Palestine.
- Cuthbert Geary MacArthur, lately Senior Assistant Game Warden, Game Department, Kenya.
- The Reverend Walter Forrest McWhan, Presbyterian Minister, Port Stanley, Falkland Islands.
- John Alexander Mitchell, Acting Chief Mechanical Engineer, Transport and Harbours Department, British Guiana.
- Hassan Esmail Nathoo, LDS. For social and welfare services in Kenya.
- John Alan Bennett Nicholson, MB, ChB, MRCS, LRCP, Colonial Medical Service, Medical Officer, Nigeria.
- Gertrude Tiang Wee Ong. For services to the Blood Transfusion Service, Singapore.
- Alfred Eric Peters, Keeper of Prisons, Antigua, Leeward Islands.
- Henry William Pledge, Staff Officer, Crown Agents for the Colonies.
- Francis Ramadhani, Staff Grade Clerk, Tanganyika Local Civil Service.
- Gershom Adolphus Ricketts. For services to education and technical training in Nigeria.
- The Reverend David Maxwell-Robertson, Principal, Jeanes School, Northern Rhodesia.
- Benedict Aloysius Skelchy. For services to the Co-operative Society Movement in the Malayan Union.
- Howard Emmett Dunscomb Smith. For services to horticulture in Bermuda.
- Evgenia Theodotou. For public services in Cyprus.
- Arthur George Whitehead, Chief Draughtsman, Lands and Mines Department, Tanganyika.
- Wilfred Augustine Kayinde Williams, Office Assistant, Public Works Department, Sierra Leone.

Dated 14 August 1947

- Arthur Robin Adair, Indian Civil Service, Additional Director of Agriculture, Bihar.
- Margaret Kerr Menzies Alexander, Medical Superintendent, Christian Raily Hospital, Todiarpet, Madras.
- Edward Herbert Annett, Superintendent, Walton Training School, North Western Railway, Lahore Cantonment.
- Allan James Vincent Arthur, Indian Civil Service, Deputy Commissioner, Multan.
- Charles William Ayton, Deputy Assistant, Chief Administrative Officer (Procedure), Defence Department, Government of India.
- Edward Harold Barnes, Spinning Master, Madura Mills, Madura, Madras.
- Kenneth Charles Batten, Higher Executive Officer, Office of the High Commissioner for India in London.
- Herbert Christopher Beaumont, Indian Political Service, Under-Secretary to the Government of India in the External Affairs and Commonwealth Relations Department.
- Peter Scott Bennett, Signal Engineer, Oudh Tirhut Railway, Gorakhpur.
- Ernest John Beveridge, Indian Police, assistant director, Intelligence Bureau, Home Department, Government of India.
- Frank Arthur Bird, Deputy Assistant Director, Ordnance Factories, General Headquarters, India.
- Captain Richard Ernest Rawland Bird, Indian Political Service, Under-Secretary, Political Department, India.
- John Blake Bowman, Indian Civil Service, Deputy Secretary to the Government of Bombay in the Revenue Department, Bombay.
- Herbert Harry Brisley, Officer Supervisor, H.Q., Military Adviser-in-Chief, Indian States Forces.
- Frank Ernest Buckler, Assistant to the Surgeon to His Excellency the Viceroy.
- Evelyn Manningham Buller. For services with the Women's Voluntary Service, India.
- Oscar Newton Burrows, Junior Mechanical Engineer, North-Western Railway, Lahore.
- Ansilin Joseph Cartland, Assistant Signal Engineer, East Indian Railway, Allahabad.
- Samuel Caterall, Mill Manager, Elgin Mills Company Ltd., Cawnpore, United Provinces.
- Nora Teresa Connaughton, Secretary to the Conference Secretary to His Excellency the Viceroy.
- Fergus Reginal Terence Connell, Superintendent, Transportation, Bengal Assam Railway, Calcutta.
- John Seymour Dowson, Executive Engineer (Surveys), Great Indian Peninsula Railway, Bombay.
- James Dumbreck, Indian Civil Service, Deputy Commissioner, Sylhet, Assam.
- Patrick Thomas Duncan, Indian Civil Service, Assistant Commissioner, Tank, North-West Frontier Province.
- Robert Fairlie, Manager, Tittaghur Jute Mill, No. 1 Bengal.
- Sybil Enid Farr, Provincial Nursing Service Superintendent, Nursing Services, United Provinces, Lucknow.
- Arthur Crump Foster, Deputy Assistant, Director, General Staff Branch, General Headquarters, India.
- June Audrey Foster, BEM, Personal Assistant to the Personal Secretary to His Excellency the Viceroy.
- George Hugh Fothergill, General Manager, Cinchona Plantations, Mungpoo, Bengal.
- James Duncan Fraser, Indian Civil Service, Additional Deputy Commissioner, Amritsar, Punjab.
- Thomas Fulton, Chief Officer, Calcutta Fire Brigade, Bengal.
- James Ross Gillespie, Indian Civil Service, District Magistrate, Muzaffarpur, Bihar.
- John Archibald Gillon, Assistant Secretary, Punjab States Residency.
- Harold Oscar Glasfurd, Principal, St. Paul's Mission School, Calcutta, Bengal.
- Kathleen Victoria Gray, Honorary Secretary, Women's Voluntary Services, Ootacamund, The Nilgiris, Madras.
- Frances Effie Grose, Principal, Lady Brabourne College, Calcutta, Bengal.
- Richard Milnes Hallows, Indian Police, Superintendent of Police, Dera Ismail Khan District, North-West Frontier Province.
- John Hamilton, Director of Administration, Civil Aviation Department, Government of India.
- Herbert George Handley, Assistant Works Manager, Carriage and Wagon Shops, North-Western Railway, Moghalpura, Lahore.
- Reginald John Harris, Deputy Transportation Superintendent, Great Indian Peninsula Railway, Bombay.
- George Francis Harrison, District Superintendent of Police, Madras.
- Mary Carnegie Hay (wife of Major-General R. Hay, CIE, KHP, IMS, Director-General, Indian Medical Service). For social and charitable services.
- Captain Robert Vivian Eric Hodson, Indian Political Service, Political Agent, North Waziristan, North-West Frontier Province.
- Patrick Lawrence Seton James, Indian Police, Assistant Political Officer, Pasighat, Sadiya Frontier Tract, Assam.
- Kumar Shri Banesinhji Jaswantsinhji Jhala, Dewan, Balasinor State.
- Eveline Rowland-Jones, JP, (wife of Mr. A. Rowland-Jones, Manager of Metro-Goldwyn-Mayer (India) Ltd., Bombay), Lady District Superintendent, St. John Ambulance Brigade Overseas, Nursing Division, No. 3 District, Bombay.
- Alice Marian Leonard, lately Honorary Secretary, Cochin Area Welfare Committee, British Cochin, Madras.
- John Thomas Lloyd, Headmaster, St. Andrew's Colonial Homes School, Kalimpong, Bengal.
- George Mackintosh, Assistant Secretary to the Government of India in the Defence Department, India.
- Una Frances Marie Martyn, Women's Medical Service for India, Superintendent, Lady Lyall and Dufferin Hospitals, Agra, United Provinces.
- Francis John McLintic, Indian Police, Superintendent of Police, Ambala, Punjab.
- Irene Ruth Mitchell, for services in South-East Asia prior to 2 September 1945.
- Vernon James Moore, Superintendent (officiating), Office of the Private Secretary to His Excellency the Viceroy.
- Margaret Mount, Soldiers', Sailors' and Airmen's Families Association (Headquarters, 1st Corps).
- Thomas Alexander Fraser Noble, Indian Civil Service, Joint Deputy Commissioner, Peshawar, North-West Frontier Province.
- Stephen John Linley Olver, Indian Political Service, Under-Secretary to the Government of India in the External Affairs and Commonwealth Relations Department.
- Rao Bahadur Ichhashankar Karunashankar Pandya, President, Council of Administration, Sirohi State.
- Frank Thomas Parsons, Indian Police Service, Officiating Superintendent of Police, Bihar.
- William Allan Channing Pearce, Indian Police, Superintendent of Police, Muttra, United Provinces.
- Harold Robert Gordon Peirce, Tea Inspector for South India.
- Alan Pickard, Signal Engineer, Great Indian Peninsula Railway, Bombay.
- John-Hubert Pugh, Officer Supervisor, Supply and Transport Directorate, General Headquarters, India.
- Arthur James Pye, Executive Officer, India Store Department, Office of the High Commissioner for India in London.
- Ronald Walter Radford, Indian Civil Service, lately District Magistrate and Collector, Shahabad District, Bihar.
- Gordon Meredith Ray, Indian Civil Service, lately District Magistrate and Collector, Gaya District, Bihar.
- Robert Ross, Indian Civil Service, District Magistrate, Burdwan, Bengal.
- Lionel Walter Sarre, Indian Police, Deputy Commissioner of Police, Bombay.
- Rao Saheb Tarachand Lakshmichand Shah, Officer on Special Duty, Baroda, Western India and Gujarat States Residency.
- Margaret Shepherd (wife of Lieutenant-Colonel J. H. Shepherd, MBE, IMS, District Medical Officer, Malabar) Madras. For medical services.
- Eric Arthur Sparks, lately Manager, Messrs. Grindlay & Co. Ltd., New Delhi, India.
- Captain Mortimer Lawrence Axen Steele, 1st Class Military Assistant Surgeon, Indian Medical Department, Medical Officer, Victoria Memorial Hospital and Quarantine Medical Officer, Bahrain, and Officiating Residency Surgeon, Persian Gulf.
- Hugh Aubrey St. Clair Stracey, Indian Police, Superintendent of Police, Gorakhpur, United Provinces.
- John James Brims Sutherland, Deputy Secretary, Bengal Chamber of Commerce, Calcutta, Bengal.
- Eric Conway Sykes, Assistant-in-Charge, Cipher Branch, Office of the Private Secretary to His Excellency the Viceroy.
- Major Maurice Patrick O'Connor Tandy, Indian Political Service, Political Agent, Kuwait, Persian Gulf.
- Edward Charles Bexley Thornton, Traction Superintendent, Great Indian Peninsula Railway, Bombay.
- David James Todd, Manager, Gun Department, Messrs. Manton & Co., Calcutta, Bengal.
- Rai Bahadur Ram Gopal Trivedi (Lieutenant-Colonel, Mewar States Forces), Minister-in-Waiting (Retired), Mewar State, Udaipur.
- Frederick Albert Utting, Provincial Civil Service, District Magistrate, Fatehpur, United Provinces.
- Hillary Waddington, Assistant Superintendent of Archaeology, India.
- James Andrew Walmsley, Deputy Secretary to the Government of India in the Industries and Supplies Department.
- Jane Elizabeth Ward, for Welfare services.
- Major Richard Edward Galliford Webber, late Commandant, 1st Unit, Bombay Civil Pioneer Force, Bombay.
- Mary Cruickshank Webster, Nursing Superintendent, Mayo Hospital, Lahore, Punjab.
- Fred Clement West, Works Manager, Carriage and Wagon, Bengal Assam Railway, Kanchrapara.
- William Harvey Whitfield, Indian Civil Service, Provincial Motor Transport Controller and Provincial Rationing Authority, Bombay.
- Katherine May Wilson, Secretary to the Principal Secretary to His Excellency the Viceroy.
- Trevor Vernon Woods, District Traffic Superintendent, Bengal Assam Railway, Calcutta.
- Martin Goymour Wynne, Indian Police, District Superintendent of Police, Amravati, Central Provinces and Berar.
- Jack Seymour Ford Yates, District Controller of Stores, North-Western Railway, Karachi.

Honorary Members

- Che Abdul Manan ibin Rahmat, lately Penghulu of Tanjong Karang, Malayan Union.
- Mohamed Hussein, Sheikh of the Tarika at Sheikh, British Somaliland.
- Amritlal Kashiram Jani, Clerk, Special Grade, Zanzibar.
- Husni Khalifa, Mayor of Acre, Palestine.
- Moses Koffy, Senior Accountant, Palestine.
- Elaineh Lubbat, Education Officer, Palestine.
- Moung Choo Yah, Secretary to the Town Board, Kuala Lumpur, Malayan Union.
- Rwang Pam, Headmaster, Riyom Elementary School, Plateau Province, Nigeria.

=== Order of the Companions of Honour (CH) ===
- The Right Honourable Margaret Grace Bondfield, LLD, JP. For public services.
- Victoria Mary, the Honourable Mrs. Harold Nicolson (Miss V. Sackville-West). For services to Literature.

=== Companion of the Imperial Service Order (ISO) ===
Burma Civil Service

- Albert Edward Ambrey, Assistant Works Manager, Burma Railways.

Indian Civil Services (dated 14 August 1947)

- Harold Maurice Evennette, Superintendent, Punjab Public Works Department Secretariat, Buildings and Roads Branch, Punjab.
- Walter Leonard Harrison, MBE, Assistant Secretary, Office of the Private Secretary to His Excellency the Viceroy.
- Barrie Grosvenor Nash, MBE, Assistant Secretary (officiating) Office of the Private Secretary to His Excellency the Viceroy.
- Francis Randel Sanger, MBE, Assistant Secretary, Office of the Military Secretary to His Excellency the Viceroy.

=== Kaisar-i-Hind Medal ===
These were the last awards of the Kaisar-i-Hind Medal. They were made "as on the 14th August, 1947" – the last day of the Indian Empire. India gained independence as the Dominion of India on 15 August 1947.

Gold Medal

- Colleen, Lady Nye (wife of His Excellency Sir Archibald Nye, GCIE, KCB, KBE, MC, Governor of Madras).
- Dora Beatrice Hutchings, Lady Burrows (wife of His Excellency Sir Frederick Burrows, GCIE, Governor of Bengal).
- Frances Marion, Lady Caroe (wife of His Excellency Sir Olaf Caroe, KCSI, KCIE, Governor of the North-West Frontier Province).
- Kusum, Lady Trivedi (wife of His Excellency Sir Chandulal Trivedi, KCSI, CIE, OBE, Governor of Orissa).
- Queenie Captain (wife of Mr. H. C. Captain, Bombay), Chief Commissioner for India Girl Guides Association, Bombay.
- Iva Noel Gibbins, Medical Superintendent, Philadelphia American Hospital, Ambala City, Punjab.
- Jean Grant, MB, ChB, Medical Officer, Church of Scotland, Seoni, Central Provinces and Berar.
- Isabella Taylor McNair, Principal, Kinnaird College for Women, Lahore, Punjab.
- Helena Wills Sutherland, Church of Scotland Mission, Chingleput, Madras.
- The Reverend Arthur Edwin Harper, Principal, Training School for Village Teachers, Moga, Ferozepore District, Punjab.
- Herbert Kirby, Doctor-in-Charge, Jorhat Leper Colony, Jorhat P.O., Assam.
- Victor Clough Rambo, MD, FACS, Doctor-in-Charge, Mission Eye Hospital, Mungeli, Central Provinces and Berar.
- Kodikal Sanjiva Row, CIE, Honorary Treasurer, Indian Red Cross Society and St. John Ambulance Association (Indian Council).
- Bhagwant Kishore Sikand, MB, BS, DPH, Medical Superintendent, New Delhi Tuberculosis Clinic.
- Ronald Wilson Thomas, MB, BS, Medical Superintendent, Baptist Mission Hospital, Palwal, Gurgaon District, Punjab.

==== Bar to the Kaisar-i-Hind Medal ====
Gold Medal

- Hilla, Lady Cowasji Jehangir (wife of Sir Cowasji Jehangir, Bt., GBE, KCIE, Bombay), chairman, Bombay Mothers' and Children's Welfare Society, Bombay.
- Jena, Lady Duggan (wife of Lieutenant-Colonel Sir Jamshedji Duggan, CIE, OBE, Bombay), chairman, Indian Red Cross Women's Council for Bombay, Bombay.
- Jean Murray Orkney, WMS, MB, ChB, DPH, Chief Medical Officer, Women's Medical Service.

=== British Empire Medal (BEM) ===
Military Division

Royal Navy

- Leading Seaman (Temporary) Robert Percy Barker, C/JX 158153.
- Air Artificer Third Class Harold John Patrick Barry, L/SFX 2110.
- Master-at-Arms Frederick Cyril Robert Boxall, P/M 40190.
- Chief Petty Officer Harry Brook, DSM, P/JX 135236.
- Quartermaster Sergeant David Richard Clarke, Po.X.2293.
- Chief Engine Room Artificer Howard Frank Davis, D/MX 45612.
- Chief Petty Officer Writer James Sidney Dron, C/MX 59843.
- Petty Officer Haji Jamil bin Haji Dzafir, SE/X 21, Malayan Royal Naval Volunteer Reserve.
- Master-at-Arms Charles John Francis, C/M 39899.
- Sick Berth Chief Petty Officer Thomas George Hallahan, D/M 7878.
- Mechanician Richard Harold Hannaford, P/KX 88331.
- Chief Petty Officer Cook (S) Harold George Herman, D/MX 48144.
- Colour Sergeant (Acting Regimental Sergeant Major) Walter French Jackson, Po.X.137.
- Chief Petty Officer Albert Henry Jervis, DSM, D/JX 132623.
- Chief Petty Officer William George Kingdon, P/J 111693.
- Chief Petty Officer Stoker Mechanic James McKintosh, P/KX 78954.
- Petty Officer Frederick George Martin, P/JX 126987.
- Chief Petty Officer Awang bin Mohamed, SE/X 234, Malayan Royal Naval Volunteer Reserve.
- Chief Petty Officer Tom Martin Moore, DSM, C/JX 126144.
- Petty Officer (A.H.2) Frederick Job Napper, C/JX 127845.
- Petty Officer Wren Patricia Ewart Neale, 40846, Women's Royal Naval Service.
- Chief Petty Officer Stoker Mechanic Charles Marshall Payne, P/KX 75663.
- Chief Radio Electrician Alfred John Reader, P/JX 129192.
- Chief Petty Officer Richard Patrick Richards, DSM, P/JX 137214.
- Air Artificer Third Class Kenneth John Russell, L/FX 75642.
- Chief Petty Officer Telegraphist Thomas Scott, P/J 110149.
- Chief Wren Steward (O) Eileen Lucy Southern, 849, Women's Royal Naval Service.
- Chief Engine Room Artificer John James Steel, C/M 39451.
- Chief Electrician (T.I.) Daniel Charles Thomas Walker, P/JX 125629.
- Chief Petty Officer Stoker Mechanic Charles Arthur Warner, C/KX 75467.
- Bandmaster First Class (Acting Company Sergeant Major) Walter Percival Wells, R.M.B. X. 171.
- Chief Yeoman of Signals John Alfred Williams, D/JX 136379.

Army

- No. 3233759 Colour-Sergeant James Ahlers, The Cameronians (Scottish Rifles).
- No. 14795463 Corporal John Allen, The York and Lancaster Regiment.
- No. W/320466 Corporal Jessie Phillip Anderson, Auxiliary Territorial Service.
- No. 863192 Sergeant Douglas Aveyard, Corps of Royal Military Police.
- No. 2307248 Sergeant (acting) Harry Barton, Royal Corps of Signals.
- No. W/54038 Sergeant Freda Boocock, Auxiliary Territorial Service.
- No. 6011123 Warrant Officer Class II (acting) Frank Wright Carey, Army Air Corps.
- No. 10566581 Corporal William James Corbett, Army Catering Corps.
- No. W/30009 Corporal Margaret Cowling, Auxiliary Territorial Service.
- No. 853020 Battery Quartermaster-Sergeant (acting) Herbert William Downes, Royal Regiment of Artillery.
- No. S/14924874 Staff-Sergeant Bryan Emes, Royal Army Service Corps.
- No. 14047440 Sapper Esmond Alfred Ewers, Corps of Royal Engineers.
- No. 2978589 Sergeant Alexander Fairfull, Corps of Royal Military Police.
- No. 6911921 Colour-Sergeant Henry Ferguson, The Rifle Brigade (Prince Consort's Own).
- No. 6975652 Warrant Officer Class II (acting) William Ferris, The Green Howards (Alexandra, Princess of Wales's Own Yorkshire Regiment).
- No. 4530410 Sergeant Joseph Wilfred Flanagan, Grenadier Guards.
- No. 4443763 Staff-Sergeant (Artillery Clerk) Francis Henry Galton, Royal Regiment of Artillery.
- No. W/40027 Warrant Officer Class II (acting) Joan Maud Mary Gardiner, Auxiliary Territorial Service.
- No. 14419346 Sergeant Raymond Harding, Royal Electrical and Mechanical Engineers.
- No. 14914418 Sergeant Arthur Alfred Hardy, Royal Corps of Signals.
- No. 14468873 Sergeant (local) John Houlden, Royal Regiment of Artillery.
- No. NA/31555 Company Sergeant-Major Ibrahim Bala, The Nigeria Regiment.
- No. NA/27364 Warrant Officer Class II Isa Sokoto, The Nigeria Regiment.
- No. 14692865 Colour-Sergeant Simon Katz, The Queen's Royal Regiment (West Surrey).
- No. 1073969 Bombardier Chester Hamilton Kelly, Royal Regiment of Artillery.
- No. N/1948 Warrant Officer Platoon Commander Kipto Cherbogei, The King's African Rifles.
- No. 14802335 Staff-Sergeant William George Lambshead, Royal Electrical and Mechanical Engineers.
- No. 2967867 Battery Quartermaster-Sergeant Clifford Vincent Lewis, Royal Regiment of Artillery.
- No. W/NC/272802 Sergeant Carmen Claudia Lopez, Auxiliary Territorial Service (Jamaica Company).
- No. 14794894 Sergeant Edwin William Albert Lovatt, Corps of Royal Engineers.
- No. 5343669 Staff-Sergeant Thomas William Marks, The Royal Berkshire Regiment (Princess Charlotte of Wales's).
- No. 316624 Squadron Quartermaster-Sergeant James Ernest McVittie, Royal Armoured Corps.
- No. 14399584 Warrant Officer Class II (acting) Ronald Edward Meyer, Royal Armoured Corps.
- No. 10679853 Warrant Officer Class II (then acting) Peter Cable Nunn, Royal Army Ordnance Corps.
- No. 2021899 Sergeant Albert Jack Pike, Royal Regiment of Artillery.
- No. W/110980 Staff-Sergeant Ella Mackenzie Pilbeam, Auxiliary Territorial Service.
- No. 3309004 Sergeant (Drum-Major) Robert Roy, The Black Watch (Royal Highland Regiment).
- No. W/270709 Sergeant Grace Patricia Rumbles, Auxiliary Territorial Service.
- No. 1950695 Staff-Sergeant John Sinclair, Corps of Royal Engineers.
- No. W/45839 Warrant Officer Class II (acting) Diana Stephenson, Auxiliary Territorial Service.
- No. 3126802 Fusilier James John Stevens, The Royal Scots Fusiliers.
- No. 1481406 Sergeant Charles Oliver Stokes, Army Catering Corps.
- No. NA/28937 Regimental Sergeant-Major (acting) Sule Ankwa, The Nigeria Regiment.
- No. 5772140 Corporal Eric Alexander Taylor, The Royal Norfolk Regiment.
- No. 2324409 Warrant Officer Class II (acting) George Webb, Royal Corps of Signals.
- No. 833302 Battery Quartermaster-Sergeant Geoffrey Walter White, Royal Regiment of Artillery.
- No. 13116095 Sergeant Kenneth Wilde, Royal Armoured Corps.
- No. ZBK/11665 Warrant Officer Platoon Commander Wilson Munthali, The King's African Rifles.
- No. 14654571 Sergeant Frederick Samuel Windridge, Royal Army Ordnance Corps.
- No. 1453860 Corporal Ronald George Wyld, The King's Regiment (Liverpool).

Dated 14 August 1947

- 804637 W.S./Sergeant (Company Quartermaster Sergeant) George Arthur Chandler, Royal Signals, attached 4th Indian Division Signal Regiment.
- 5444857 Staff Sergeant Noel Hammond Doutre, Royal Army Service Corps.
- 14297895 Sergeant, Acting Staff Sergeant, Reginald Griffiths, Royal Army Medical Corps, attached Medical Directorate, G.H.Q., India.
- 14531844 W.S./Sergeant Peter Malcolm Todd, Royal Army Service Corps, attached Headquarters 7th Indian Division.
- 14661925 W.S./Sergeant, Acting Company Quartermaster Sergeant Douglas Franklin Wood, Royal Signals, attached Indian Signals Corps School.

Royal Air Force

- 524308 Flight Sergeant John Adam.
- 519415 Flight Sergeant Joseph Kenneth Archer.
- 560591 Flight Sergeant Herbert William Cooper.
- 561073 Flight Sergeant Maurice Crawford.
- 950543 Flight Sergeant Reginald Mark Daniel, RAF Volunteer Reserve.
- 364037 Flight Sergeant Robert Fleming.
- 1792652 Flight Sergeant Stuart Benjamin Greet, RAF Volunteer Reserve.
- 532945 Flight Sergeant Jack Hartley.
- 566505 Flight Sergeant Charles Albert Frederick Kettle.
- 536028 Flight Sergeant Stanley Leonard.
- 561601 Flight Sergeant Harold Norster.
- 570327 Flight Sergeant John Charles Payne.
- 546053 Flight Sergeant John Williamson Smallfield.
- 523547 Flight Sergeant Arthur Thomas Summers.
- 626458 Flight Sergeant Rex Travers.
- 748972 Flight Sergeant George Edward Trott.
- 544551 Flight Sergeant John Turvey.
- 1008331 Sergeant Reginald Charles Callow, RAF Volunteer Reserve.
- 654429 Sergeant Leonard Lewin Cobbin.
- 569850 Sergeant Bruce Lionel Cosh.
- 567543 Sergeant Victor George Frost.
- 591907 Sergeant Stanley Charles Nurse.
- 936155 Sergeant Jack Corbett Percival.
- 536449 Acting Sergeant Thomas Stockbridge.
- 1405758 Corporal Theodore Edward John Harrison.
- 3056731 Acting Corporal Maurice Hunt, RAF Volunteer Reserve.
- 881945 Sergeant Margaret Blaney, Women's Auxiliary Air Force.
- 2003668 Sergeant Margaret Emma Campbell, Women's Auxiliary Air Force.
- 444514 Sergeant Nancy Smith, Women's Auxiliary Air Force.
- 2161345 Corporal Gwendoline Mabel Hindes, Women's Auxiliary Air Force.

Civil Division

United Kingdom

- Harry Abbotts, Overseer, Head Post Office, Stafford.
- Humphrey Ackers, lately Haulage Hand, Garswood Hall Colliery, Wigan.
- Henry Adkins, Foreman, Thomas De la Rue & Co. Ltd.
- Donald Arnold, Works Foreman, Steerpoint Brickworks, Brixham.
- William Henry Ashcroft, Radial Driller, Castner-Kellner Works, Imperial Chemical Industries Ltd.
- William Atkin, Head Foreman, River Hull Catchment Board.
- Herbert Harry Auker, Gardener-Caretaker, Imperial War Graves Commission, France.
- George Edward Bagnall, Senior Foreman, Chadburns (Liverpool) Ltd., Liverpool.
- Jean Bailey, Member, Women's Voluntary Services, Clogher, County Tyrone.
- Norman James Banks, Senior Examiner, Admiralty, Crayford.
- Olive Adele Barbour, Manageress, N.A.A.F.I. Canteen, Victory House, Kingsway.
- William Barnes, Skilled Fitter, Guest, Keen & Nettlefolds Ltd., Birmingham.
- William John Barnes, Chief Divisional Inspector, Birmingham Division, Great Western Railway Company.
- Heber Thomas Barrett, Assistant Inspector, Head Post Office, Richmond, Surrey.
- Albert William Bassett, Warden, Kingsbury Rifle Range, Territorial and Auxiliary Forces Association of the County of Warwick.
- William Edward Bassett, Foreman, Royal Small Arms Factory, Enfield.
- Mark Stephenson Bateson, Sub-Postmaster, Main Street Sub-Post Office, Menston, Leeds.
- Hedley John Beare, Postman, Morwenstow Sub-Post Office, Bude, Cornwall.
- Graham Bell, Inspector, Forth Bridge, London & North Eastern Railway Company.
- John Campbell Bennett, Skilled Workman, Class I, General Post Office, Tunbridge Wells, Kent.
- Thomas Bickle, Grinder, Clarke Chapman & Co., Gateshead-on-Tyne.
- Thomas Birmingham, Office Keeper, Ministry of Supply.
- Robert Blackburn, Coal Hewer, Boldon Colliery, County Durham.
- Thomas Bone, Oncost Worker, Auchingeich Colliery, Lanarkshire.
- Nellie Bowker, lately Telephone Supervisor, Ministry of Transport.
- George Ernest Bradford, Supervisor, Grade III, Control Commission for Germany.
- Thomas Bradford, Underground Haulage Corporal, Teversal Colliery, Nottinghamshire.
- Rendels Bradshaw, Charge-hand, Howard & Bullough Ltd., Accrington.
- Florence Brealey, Supervisor, Post Office Telephone Exchange, Nottingham.
- Arthur Brown, Coal Face Worker, Denby (Drury-Lowe) Colliery, Derbyshire.
- Flossie Brown, Supervisor (Telephone Service Observation), Telecommunications Department, General Post Office.
- Eirene F. Bruce, Centre Organiser, Women's Voluntary Services, Whitby Urban District.
- Henry Thomas Bryant, Cold Store Blockman, Port of London Authority, Royal Albert Dock.
- Alfred Charles Buckingham, Bridge Inspector, Reading, Great Western Railway Company.
- Alfred George William Bullock, Assistant Superintendent, Ordnance Survey Department.
- Lewis Burt, Stoneman, Elemore Colliery, County Durham.
- John Cameron, Senior Foreman, Brown Bros. & Co. Ltd., Edinburgh.
- James Alfred Carter, Inspector, Trams and Trolleybuses, London Passenger Transport Board.
- William Thomas Carter, Foreman of the Wharf, Royal Victoria Yard, Deptford.
- Jack Stanley Cavill, Engineering Supervisor, Posts & Telecommunications Branch, Düsseldorf, Control Commission for Germany.
- Mrs. Roland Clarke, Centre Organiser, Women's Voluntary Services, High Wycombe, Bucks.
- Annie Clough, Card Room Hand, Winder & McKeen, Bradford Mills, Bolton.
- Richard William Coker, Area Inspector, Class I, Clapham Junction, Southern Railway Company.
- James Cole, Detective Inspector, Aberdeen City Police Force.
- Wallace George Colegate, Watcher-in-Charge, Coast Life Saving Corps, Warden Point, Isle of Sheppey.
- Alexander Gilbert Colson, Switchboard Attendant, Admiralty Signal Establishment, Witley.
- Charles Richard Dawson Cope, Motorman, London Passenger Transport Board.
- John Robert Copplestone, Chef, Union Jack Club, London.
- Alice R. Cox, Village Organiser and Collector, National Savings Movement, Badgworth, Somerset.
- Joseph Craddock, Coal Filler, Sleekburn 'A' Colliery, Northumberland.
- George Crowther, Laboratory Worker, Grade "A", Chemical Research and Development Department, Ministry of Supply.
- Albert Henry Croxon, Foreman, Elliott Bros. (London) Ltd., Lewisham.
- Muriel Culverwell, Centre Organiser, Women's Voluntary Services, Chippenham.
- Gladys Eveline Cummins, Street Group Organiser and Collector, National Savings Movement, Shirley, Southampton.
- Richard Dally, Miner, Llanhilleth Colliery, Monmouthshire.
- Harry Davies, Process Operator, Monsanto Chemicals Ltd., Wrexham.
- Robert Davies, Cable Machine Operator, British Insulated Callender's Cables Ltd.
- Joseph Day, lately Station Master, New Cross Gate and Brockley, Southern Railway Company.
- Frederick Joseph Dollin, Manager, Shipping Pool Office, Fleetwood.
- Winifred Boaler Dore, Assistant Supervisor, Class I (Travelling), Post Office Telephone Exchange, Colwyn Bay.
- Maurice Dutton, Foreman, A. Kershaw & Sons Ltd., Leeds.
- Harold Ellison, Head Foreman, B.S. & W. Whiteley Ltd., Yorkshire.
- Edward David Evans, Underground Workman, Llay Hall Colliery, North Wales.
- Evans, Underground Workman, John Ynysarwed Colliery, South Wales.
- Thomas Evans, Overman, Fenton (Glebe) Colliery, Stoke-on-Trent.
- William W. Everitt, Ganger, River Great Ouse Catchment Board.
- Thomas Fairclough, Colliery Checkweighman, Bedford Colliery, Lancashire.
- William John Fenwick, Acting Foreman of Storehouses, Royal Naval Yard, Trincomalee.
- Herbert James Field, Charge Hand, Wood Lane Depot, London Passenger Transport Board.
- Frederick Edward Fitch, lately General Foreman of Works, HM Dockyard, Chatham.
- Frank William Foote, Inspector, Post Office Telephones, Liverpool.
- William Ford, JP, Blacksmith Foreman, Prestongrange Colliery, East Lothian.
- Albert France, MM, Coalfiller, New Stubbin Colliery, Rotherham.
- William James Franklin, Inspector, Great Western Railway Police Force.
- Samuel Fretwell, Coalminer, Baddesley Colliery, Warwickshire.
- Jean M. Furness, Centre Organiser, Women's Voluntary Services, Melton Mowbray Urban District.
- George Gibb, Ripper, Betteshanger Colliery, Kent.
- Patty Goode, Centre Organiser, Women's Voluntary Services, Burgess Hill Urban District, East Sussex.
- Robert Goodyear, Foreman, Witham and Steeping Rivers Catchment Board.
- George Greenhouse, Heavy Floor Moulder, General Electric Company Ltd., Witton.
- Joseph Walter Halfpenny, Stone Contractor, Rufford Colliery, Nottinghamshire.
- Edwin Hamer, Cotton Worker, Lambert's Carr Hall Mill, Haslingden.
- William Hamilton, Factory Foreman, Thomas Boag & Co. Ltd., Greenock.
- Elsie Handy, Cook, Queen Elizabeth Hospital, Birmingham.
- Robert Henry Hardy, Inspector, Stamford Hill Telephone Exchange, General Post Office.
- George Richard Harratt. For public services in Northampton.
- Robert Harris, Foreman, Royal Arsenal, Woolwich.
- Catherine Alice Hatton, Matron, Dorchester (Dorset) Children's Home.
- Arthur Healey, Foreman Papermaker, Robert Fletcher & Sons Ltd., Oldham.
- Bertha Evelyn Hince, Assistant, Grade I, Post Office Telephones, Brentwood, Essex.
- Thomas Hinton, Bird Keeper, St James's Park, Ministry of Works.
- Joseph Pearson Leslie Hobbs, Depot Manager, House Coal Scheme, Bletchley District.
- William Holbrook, Technician, Head Post Office, Welshpool.
- Alec Holdsworth, Plant Engineer, Wilsons & Mathiesons Ltd., Leeds.
- Samson Holloway, Operator, Lilleshall Company Ltd., Shropshire.
- Albert Hooper, Acting Foreman of Storehouses, Admiralty Storage Depot, Risley.
- Elizabeth Mary Hucksted, lately Sub-Postmistress, Luton Road Sub-Post Office, Chatham.
- Margaret Hughes, Honorary Organiser and Collector, Street Groups, National Savings Movement, Anglesey.
- Ben Idle, Deputy (Overman), Sharleston West Colliery, Yorkshire.
- Reginald Eric Jones, Resident Porter, Admiralty Research Laboratory, Teddington.
- Walter Jones, Collier, Ocean Western Colliery, Nanrymoel.
- William Jordan, Foreman Shipwright, Hellyer Bros., Hull.
- Philip Lancaster, Clerk of Works, Royal Air Force Base, Singapore.
- Harry Langford, Works Engineer, A. W. Hawkesley Ltd., Gloucester.
- Alfred Richard Leaning, Foreman Fitter, Rose Bros. (Gainsborough) Ltd., Lincolnshire.
- Mary Theresa Leather, Quartermaster, Women's Voluntary Services, Troops Canteen, Evesham.
- Margaret Isobel Leechman, Canteen Worker, Church of Scotland.
- Bernard Ignatius Lynch, Ground Fitter, Martin Baker Aircraft Company Ltd., Middlesex.
- James McDonald, Section Leader, National Fire Service, Perth and Kinross Area of Scotland.
- Charles McGowan, Head Foreman Plater, Harland & Wolff Ltd., Glasgow.
- Robert McGuffin, Foreman Tenter, William Ewart & Sons Ltd., Belfast.
- Betty Nora MacNamara, Station Senior Supervisor, Cable & Wireless, London.
- Edward Martin, Stripper, Haigh Colliery, Whitehaven.
- Frank Fred Mather, Group Collector, National Savings Movement, Lincoln.
- John Edgar Maxam, Process Worker, Van den Burghs & Jurgens Ltd., Purfleet, Essex.
- Thomas Miles, Mine Sinking and Driving Contractor, Scottish Coalfield.
- Monica Mitchell, County Clothing Officer, Women's Voluntary Services, Cumberland.
- William Mitchell, Cattleman, Skellymarm, Strichen, Aberdeenshire.
- James Moran, Operative, Dunlop Rubber Company Ltd., Manchester.
- David John Morse, Checkweigher, Werfa Dare Colliery, Aberdare.
- Catherine Scott Morton, Centre Organiser, Women's Voluntary Services, Airdrie.
- Albert James Murphy, Temporary Housing Superintendent, Ministry of Works.
- Henry Joseph Nichols, Overseer, Eastern District Office, London Postal Region.
- William Harry Nicholson, Running Shed Superintendent, Eastleigh, Southern Railway Company.
- Hubert Alfred Fountaine North, Bandmaster, 14th County of London Cadet Battalion.
- Dorothy Annie Nye, Supervisor, Branch Telephone Exchange, New Scotland Yard.
- Margaret O'Hara, Group Secretary, National Savings Movement, Belfast.
- Leslie Jack Pacey, DCM, Senior Messenger, Burma Office.
- Albert Parkes, MM, Stallman, Hilton Main Colliery, Wolverhampton.
- Herbert Parkinson, Overseer, Head Post Office, Bradford.
- William George Henry Parsons, Chief Inspector, War Department Constabulary.
- Sidney Campion Peach, Chargehand Telephone Operator, Royal Air Force Station, Cranwell.
- Albert Weighill Peacock, Collier, Barnsley Main Colliery, Yorkshire.
- Albert Edward Pearman, Motor Driver, Post Office Stores Department, Birmingham.
- Arthur George Perryman, Acting Senior Draughtsman, Admiralty Mining Establishment, Havant.
- Ernest Henry Pitt, Foreman, Salvage Division Reconditioning Depots, Ministry of Food.
- William George Prescott, MC, lately Instructor, Duke of York's Royal Military School.
- Philip Raisbeck, Builders Foreman, Control Commission for Germany.
- Frank Crompton Read, Permanent Chargeman of Shipwrights, HM Dockyard, Chatham.
- Elizabeth Reid, Temporary Telephonist, Ministry of Food Divisional Office, Belfast.
- Ernest Arthur Rendell, Company Officer, No. 39 (Swindon) Fire Force, National Fire Service.
- Helene Rich, Superintendent of Cleaners, Ministry of Works.
- Henry Richardson, Foreman, English Steel Corporation Ltd., Sheffield.
- Albert Rickards, Senior Examiner, Aeronautical Inspection Directorate, Ministry of Supply.
- Andrew Ritchie, General Foreman, Ministry of Transport.
- Joseph Roebuck, Checkweighman, Wooley Colliery, Yorkshire.
- Mabel Valeria Roper, Supervisor of Sorting Assistants, Savings Department, General Post Office.
- Douglas James Rowett, Head of Central Timing and Diagramming Section, Southern Area, London & North Eastern Railway Company.
- William Randolph Everett Satchell, Instructor of Engineers, British Overseas Airways Corporation.
- Horace Saunders, Instructor, Grade I, No. 1 School of Technical Training, Royal Air Force Halton, Aylesbury.
- Ben Savage, Utility Man, Northern Aluminium Company Ltd., Newport, Monmouthshire.
- Vincent Savona, Foreman Engineer, War Department Cold Storage Plant, Port Said.
- Horace Arthur Shackelton, Foreman Electrician, Hepworth & Grandage Ltd., Bradford.
- May Shanahan, lately Chief Officer, Class II, HM Prison Manchester.
- Herbert Stanley Sharp, Shop Foreman, No. 4 Maintenance Unit, Royal Air Force, Ruislip.
- Clare Sheppard, Deputy Laundry Superintendent, Vale Brook Lodge Public Assistance Institution, Nottingham.
- Hubert Silvester, Senior Foreman, River Ouse (Yorkshire) Catchment Board.
- John Thompson Simpson, Head Foreman Joiner, Swan Hunter & Wigham Richardson Ltd., Wallsend-on-Tyne.
- Elsie May Smith, Street Group Collector, National Savings Movement, West Hartlepool.
- Frank Smith, Office Keeper, Air Ministry.
- Arthur Henry Sparks, Head Office Inspector, Watford, London Midland & Scottish Railway Company.
- Edward Spavin, Chargehand, Imperial Chemical Industries Ltd.
- Albert Starr, Sergeant, Lincolnshire Constabulary.
- Audrey Stewart, lately Centre Organiser, Women's Voluntary Services, Shaftesbury Borough and Rural District.
- Constance Stopper, County Clothing Officer, Women's Voluntary Services, Leicestershire.
- Sidney Swift, Deputy Office Keeper, Ministry of National Insurance.
- Mary Taylor, Member, Women's Land Army, Dunsop Bridge, Clitheroe.
- Audrey Thackrey, Member, Women's Land Army, Lindsey Division of Lincolnshire.
- Doris Jessie Thwaites, Assistant Supervisor, Class I, Gerrard Telephone Exchange, General Post Office.
- Frances Olivia Tomlin, Deputy Centre Organiser, Women's Voluntary Services, Battle Rural District.
- Frank Charles Toombs, Foreman, British Oil & Cake Mills Ltd., John Robinson & Co. Branch, Bristol.
- William Towers, Roller, Platt Bros. & Co. Ltd., Oldham.
- Samuel Tunnicliffe, Chargehand Blacksmith, Imperial Chemical Industries Ltd., Buxton.
- John Turnbull, Senior Draughtsman, Admiralty.
- Richard Walker, Foreman, Royal Aircraft Establishment, Farnborough.
- John Allardyce Wallace, MM, Warrant Officer, No. 367 (City of Sheffield) Squadron, Air Training Corps.
- Phyllis Mary Walton, Member, Women's Land Army, Hampton-on-the-Hill, Warwickshire.
- William John Ward, Company Officer, No. 2 (Middlesbrough) Fire Force, National Fire Service.
- Winifred Kate Weaver, lately Regional Storekeeper, No. 9 (Birmingham) Region, Women's Voluntary Services.
- Jesse Webber, Assistant Foreman, Mechanical Transport, Experimental Bridging Establishment, Ministry of Supply.
- George Webster, Collier, Highgate Colliery, Rotherham.
- John Thomas Weighell, Signalman, Northallerton, London & North Eastern Railway Company.
- Harry Whidbourne, lately Foreman of Workshops, Telecommunications Research Establishment, Ministry of Supply.
- James Burnett White, Body Jig Maker, Armstrong Siddeley Ltd.
- James Wilkie, Chief Bookseller, HM Stationery Office, Edinburgh.
- Frank Milner Williams, Area Inspector, Southern Railway Company.
- Jane Williams, Process worker, Bickford Smith Factory, Imperial Chemical Industries Ltd.
- Mary Lloyd Williams, Village Organiser, Llandwrog & District Savings Sub-Committee.
- Henry George Winks, Foreman of Works, Science Museum.
- Arthur Wisdom, Mechanic Examiner, Electrical and Mechanical Equipment Inspectorate, Ministry of Supply.
- William Young, Harbour Master, Royal Harbour of Ardglass, County Down.

Foreign Services

- Dorothy Rieussat Cawdle, Sergeant, Women's Transport Service (First Aid Nursing Yeomanry).
- Kathleen Mary Eddy, Sergeant, Women's Transport Service (First Aid Nursing Yeomanry).

Colonial Empire

- Herbert Seymour Selman, Resident Foreman, Waterworks Department, Barbados.
- Anthony Paul, Inspector of Police, Class I, and Bandmaster, Ceylon Police.
- Manasa Tauca, President, Nausori Co-operative Market Association, Fiji.
- Cornelius Hymanson Thomas, Senior Foreman of Works, Public Utilities Department, Gambia.
- Battata Badja, Head of Badjakunda Village, Gambia.
- Mohamed Yousif Khan, Postal Clerk, Hong Kong.
- Jeremiah Nyawira, Head Scout of Veterinary Department, Kenya.
- Lincoln Zakaeiah, Hospital Assistant, Grade I, Medical Department, Kenya.
- Shadrack Munyi wa Kamwithi, Senior Agricultural Instructor, Department of Agriculture, Kenya.
- Joseph Micallef, Third Class Officer, Customs Department, Malta.
- Peter Paul Chetcuti, Postman, Postal Department, Malta.
- Saleemeh Ibrahim Shibley, Graduate Nurse, Public Health Department, Palestine.
- Yusef Ali Khalid, Mukhtar of Zakariya Village, Hebron Sub-District, Palestine.
- Miriam Danielly, Senior Supervisor, Jaffa Telephone Exchange, Palestine.
- Ghaleb Younis El Husseini, Station Engineer, Jerusalem Water Supply, Palestine.
- James Lawley, First British Warder Sergeant, Prison Service, Palestine.
- Thomas Sidney Johnson, Technical Staff Grade II, Sierra Leone Railway.
- Emanuel Joseph Beale, Assistant Medical Storekeeper, Sierra Leone.
- Benjamin Hoi Cheah, Chief Record Clerk and Interpreter, Prisons Department, Singapore.
- Mathew Nyirenda, Hospital Assistant, Grade III, Mwika Dispensary, Tanganyika.
- Robert Charles Denbar, 1st Class Customs and Excise Guard, Trinidad.
- Sydney Russell Baldwin, 1st Class Clerk (Non-Establishment), Port and Marine Department, Trinidad.

India (dated 14 August 1947)

- Frederick James Challan, Boiler Shop Foreman, Grade IV, North-Western Railway, Moghalpura, Lahore.
- Irene Mary Fahie, Superintendent, General Headquarters, India.
- Herbert George Fentum, Reserve Inspector of Police, Central Provinces and Berar.
- Maud Aileen Mackleworth, Grade "A", Lady Clerk, Defence Department, Government of India.
- Samuel Eric Marsden, Firemaster, North-Western Railway, Moghalpura, Lahore.
- Bertram Pearce, Superintendent, Viceregal Garage, and Chauffeur to His Excellency the Viceroy. (Staff Sergeant, Royal Army Service Corps).
- Terence Perkins, Foreman, Foundries, Grade III, North-Western Railway, Moghalpura, Lahore.
- Frank Leonard Round, lately Officiating Assistant Mechanical Engineer, Great Indian Peninsula Railway, Parel.
- Margaret Thomson, Confidential Assistant, Mysore Residency.
- Gilbert Edward Townsend, Assistant Mechanical Engineer, Great Indian Peninsula Railway, Parel.
- Emily Edith Wilson, Lands, Hirings and Disposals Directorate, General Headquarters, India.
- Charles Russell Woolnough, Chauffeur to the High Commissioner for India in London.

=== Royal Red Cross (RRC) ===
- Muriel Bannatyne Goulton, Acting Senior Sister, Queen Alexandra's Royal Naval Nursing Service.
- Anna Muir, Nursing Sister, Queen Alexandra's Royal Naval Nursing Service.
- Matron (temporary) Margaret Whamond (215733), Territorial Army Nursing Service.
- Matron Irene Desouza, ARRC, (N.Z.8253), Indian Military Nursing Service.
- Principal Matron (acting) Winifred Enid Gardiner, ARRC, (N.Z.12842), Indian Military Nursing Service.

Bar to Royal Red Cross

- Matron Catherine Walker, RRC, (5007), Princess Mary's Royal Air Force Nursing Service.

==== Associate of the Royal Red Cross (ARRC) ====
Associate of the Royal Red Cross, Second Class.

- Senior Sister (temporary) Marion Lyell (353660), Queen Alexandra's Imperial Military Nursing Service (Reserve).
- Matron Maude Adelaide Barwick (N.Z.4698), Indian Military Nursing Service.
- Matron Clarice Isabelle Cartner (N.Z.8410), Indian Military Nursing Service.
- Sister Phyllis Mary Fonceca (N.Z.24168), Indian Military Nursing Service.
- Matron Iris Murray (N.Z.4507), Indian Military Nursing Service.
- Acting Matron Millicent Clara Rattenberry (5044), Princess Mary's Royal Air Force Nursing Service.

=== Air Force Cross (AFC) ===
Royal Navy

Lieutenants

- Stanley Gordon Orr, DSC.
- Eric Michael Welch, DFC.

Royal Air Force

Wing Commanders

- Arthur Ernest Dale, DFM, (36232).
- Richard Ian Jones (33167).

Acting Wing Commander

- John Robert Baldwin, DSO, DFC, (122337).

Squadron Leaders

- Ian Robert Campbell (33557).
- James Stewart Higgins, DFC, (44680).
- Edgar James, DFC, (67346).
- Eric Franklin Thornicroft, DFM, (47208).

Acting Squadron Leaders

- Frederick John Cable (89581), RAF Volunteer Reserve.
- Anthony Derek George Stephenson, DFC, (41535).

Flight Lieutenants

- John Francis Massy Bevan (49261).
- Robert Thornley Bowring (50529).
- Welsh Foster, DFM, (45124).
- William Gallagher, MVO, (48955).
- William Frederick Hoffmann (150015), RAF Volunteer Reserve.
- Cecil Jack Homes (162299).
- Charles Francis Kirkwood-Hackett (39992), Reserve of Air Force Officers.
- Alfred Lloyd (153251).
- Jack Ewart Major (147761), RAF Volunteer Reserve.
- Tihomas Hermangild Meyer (114915), RAF Volunteer Reserve.
- John Hubert Pinckard (175722), RAF Volunteer Reserve.
- Frederick Norman Ramsey (54041).
- Jacques Emile Leon Rivalant (134321), RAF Volunteer Reserve.
- David Arnot Shaw, DFC, (170275), RAF Volunteer Reserve.
- Neil Currie Thorne (154447), RAF Volunteer Reserve.
- Ronald Vincent Yates Walmsley (52016).

Acting Flight Lieutenant

- Stanley John Hubbard, DFC, (179943) Royal Air Force.

Flying Officers

- George Herbert Carter (195846), RAF Volunteer Reserve.
- Geoffrey Jukes (167945), RAF Volunteer Reserve.
- William John Oliver Morrison (187550), RAF Volunteer Reserve.
- Peter Rowland (184437), RAF Volunteer Reserve.

Acting Warrant Officer

- Donald Sinclair Campbell (541331).

Royal Australian Air Force

Squadron Leader

- Cyril William Stark (Aus.576).

Flight Lieutenants

- John Gladstone Cornish (Aus.422430).
- David Robert Hebbard (Aus.406998).
- Allan James Somerville (Aus.402765).
- Albert Starkey (Aus.20561).
- Geoffrey Tuck (Aus.409348).

==== Bar to Air Force Cross ====
Royal Air Force

Acting Wing Commander

- Roy Charles Edwin Scott, AFC, (36250).

Squadron Leaders

- Michael Charles Adderley, AFC, (40973),
- Michael Dillon Lyne, AFC, (33431).

=== Air Force Medal (AFM) ===
Royal Air Force

Navigator II

- 1317244 Gordon James Howell Mewis.

Engineer II

- 578366 John Bowman Elder, DFM.

=== King's Commendation for Valuable Service in the Air ===
United Kingdom

- Captain Charles Edward Madge, Senior Captain, British Overseas Airways Corporation.

Royal Air Force

Squadron Leader

- R. R. Jeffery (46086).

Flight Lieutenants

- E. L. D. Drake, DFC, (118557).
- H. T. Lerry (49135).
- H. W. Taylor, DFC, (47000).

Flying Officers

- D. E. Edney (201291), RAF Volunteer Reserve.
- A. G. Henderson (196895), RAF Volunteer Reserve.
- R. I. Sneddon (57891).

Pilots II

- 1580293 W. H. Atkins.
- 1580038 N. W. Davey, RAF Volunteer Reserve.

Navigator II

- 1569031 C. Mcclelland.

Signaller II

- 578490 D. A. Birchall.

Engineers II

- 16771880 A. S. Shoebottom.
- 18215997 A. S. Simpson.

Royal Australian Air Force

Wing Commander

- G. D. Marshall (Aus.208).

Flight Lieutenants

- J. P. Graney (Aus.4O7944).
- J. C. Green (Aus.412590).
- E. W. Guy (Aus.418106).

=== King's Commendation for Brave Conduct ===
- Flight Lieutenant F. W. Gregory (Aus.275478), Royal Australian Air Force.

=== King's Police and Fire Services Medal (KPFSM) ===
England and Wales

Police

- Francis Cecil Summers, Chief Constable, Warrington Borough Police Force.
- Charles Hubert Walters, Chief Constable, Lincoln City Police Force.
- Ronald Paterson Wilson, Chief Constable, West Sussex Constabulary.
- Major George William Richard Hearn, First Assistant Chief Constable, Staffordshire Constabulary.
- Frederick Waddington, Chief Superintendent, Lancashire Constabulary.
- Reginald John Child, Superintendent, Metropolitan Police Force.
- Michael Bennett, Superintendent, Coventry City Police Force.
- Charles William French, Superintendent and Deputy Chief Constable, Rochdale Borough Police Force.
- Percy Hawkins, Superintendent, Derbyshire Constabulary.
- William Edward Astley, Sub-Divisional Inspector, Metropolitan Police Force.

Fire Services

- Albert Patrick Loisel Sullivan, CBE, MM, formerly Chief of Fire Staff and Inspector-in-Chief, National Fire Service Headquarters.
- Denis William Bates, Fire Force Commander, No. 37 (London) Fire Force.
- Francis Dann, OBE, Fire Force Commander, No. 27 (Manchester) Fire Force.
- Clement Murray Kerr, Fire Force Commander, No. 23 (Worcester) Fire Force.
- Charles Edward Mant, Company Officer, No. 32 (Worthing) Fire Force.

Scotland

Police

- Major Sholto William Douglas, CBE, DSO, Chief Constable, Midlothian, East Lothian, West Lothian and Peebles Constabularies.
- Thomas Instant Paxton, Superintendent and Deputy Chief Constable, Ayrshire Constabulary.

Fire Services

- Robert Thomas Wylie, MBE, Deputy Fire Force Commander, South Eastern Area, Scotland.

Northern Ireland

- Thomas Jackson, Head Constable, Ulster Constabulary.

Australia

- Leonard Frank Allmond, ex-Inspector, 2nd Class, New South Wales Police Force.
- Wilfred Stanley Eddie, ex-Sergeant, 1st Class, New South Wales Police Force.

Burma

- U Ba Maung, KSM, TDM, Inspector General of Police, Burma.
- Samuel Gordon Arnaud Scott, MBE, District Superintendent of Police, Kyankpyu.

Colonies, Protectorates and Mandated Territories

- Gan Chai Lai, Detective Sub-Inspector, Malayan Union Police.
- Matthew Kirkham Needham Collens, CPM, Deputy Commissioner of Police, Nigeria.
- Ronald Stuart Shuel, CPM, Assistant Commissioner of Police, Nigeria.
- Alan Courtenay Luck, CPM, Assistant Commissioner of Police, Nigeria.
- Kenneth Page Hadingham, CPM, Superintendent of Police, Palestine.

India (dated 14 August 1947)

- Duncan Charles Thomas Cameron, Deputy Inspector General of Police.
- Mallavarapu Lourdu Thomas, Deputy Superintendent of Police (officiating), Madras.
- Narayanrav Marutirav Kamte, MBE, Indian Police, Officiating Deputy Inspector of Police, Criminal Investigation Department, Province of Bombay.
- Govind Hari Wanjara, Officiating Deputy Commissioner of Police, Bombay.
- Kenneth Tolson, Indian Police, Superintendent of Police, Bengal.
- Percy John Holden, Second Officer, Calcutta Fire Brigade.
- Gerald Arthur Swift, Indian Police, Deputy Inspector-General of Police, United Provinces.
- Naresh Chandra Misra, Indian Police, Assistant Inspector-General of Police, Criminal Investigation Department, United Provinces.
- Rai Bahadur Badri Nath, Officiating Superintendent of Police, Criminal Investigation Department, Punjab.
- Rai Bahadur Avadh Kishore Prasad Sinha, Indian Police, Officiating Deputy Inspector-General of Police, Criminal Investigation Department, Bihar, Patna.
- Saiyid Ali Abbas, Officiating Superintendent of Police, Darbhanga.
- Rai Saheb Kailash Jha, Officiating Deputy Superintendent of Police, Siwan, Saran District, Bihar.
- Ashley Norman Postance Jones, Commandant, Special Armed Constabulary, Central Provinces and Berar.
- Lala Kirpa Ram, Deputy Superintendent of Police, North West Frontier Province.
- Said Kamal Badshah, Officiating Deputy Superintendent of Police, Railway Police, North West Frontier Province.
- Pran Kumar Mitter, Indian Police, Officiating Deputy Inspector-General of Police, Orissa.
- Rai Sahib Kartar Nath Malhoutra, Indian Police, Inspector-General of Police, Rewa State, Central India.
