= Percy Cradock =

British diplomat (1923–2010)

The Right Honourable Sir Percy Cradock GCMG

British Ambassador to the People's Republic of China
- In office 1978–1983
- Monarch: Elizabeth II
- Preceded by: Sir Edward Youde
- Succeeded by: Sir Richard Evans

Chargé d'affaires, Peking
- In office 1968–1969
- Monarch: Elizabeth II
- Preceded by: Sir Donald Hopson
- Succeeded by: John Denson

Personal details
- Born: 26 October 1923 Byers Green, County Durham, England
- Died: 22 January 2010 (aged 86) London, England
- Education: Alderman Wraith Grammar School, Spennymoor
- Alma mater: St John's College, Cambridge

Sir Percy Cradock GCMG PC (Chinese: 柯利達爵士, 26 October 1923 – 22 January 2010) was a British diplomat, civil servant and sinologist who served as British Ambassador to the People's Republic of China from 1978 to 1983, playing a significant role in the Sino-British negotiations which led up to the signing of the Sino-British Joint Declaration in 1984.

Joining the Foreign Office in 1954, Cradock served primarily in Asia and was posted to the British Chargé d'affaires Office in Peking (now referred to in English as Beijing) at the outset of the Cultural Revolution in 1966. He, along with other British subjects, was manhandled by the Red Guards and the mobs when the office was set on fire on 22 August 1967. After the rioting, Cradock served as Chargé d'affaires in Peking from 1968 to 1969, and later succeeded Sir Edward Youde as British Ambassador to the People's Republic of China in 1978. His ambassadorship witnessed the start of the Sino-British negotiations in 1982, which subsequently resulted in the Joint Declaration in 1984, an agreement deciding the future of the sovereignty of Hong Kong after 1997. However, the decision of Cradock, who was the British chief negotiator in the negotiations, to compromise with the Chinese authorities, was regarded as a major retreat by the general media in Hong Kong and the United Kingdom, and was heavily criticised at that time as betraying the people of Hong Kong.

Cradock remained a trusted advisor to the then Prime Minister, Margaret Thatcher, who appointed him as Chairman of the Joint Intelligence Committee in 1985. After the Tiananmen Square protests of 1989, he was the first senior British official to pay a visit to the Chinese leadership in the hope of maintaining the much criticised Joint Declaration. He was successful in fighting to guarantee, in the Basic Law of Hong Kong, that half of the seats of the Legislative Council would be directly elected by 2007. However, Cradock worsened his relationship with Thatcher's successor, John Major, by forcing him to visit China in 1991 after the row between the two countries over the Airport Core Programme of Hong Kong. Major had enough of the compromising attitude of Cradock and the-then Governor of Hong Kong, Sir David Wilson, and finally decided to have both of them replaced in 1992, choosing instead his Conservative-ally Chris Patten as Governor.

Unlike his predecessors, Patten was strongly criticised by the Chinese authorities during his governorship because he introduced a series of democratic reforms without consulting them. Although Cradock had retired, he joined the pro-Beijing camp, and became one of the most prominent critics of Governor Patten, censuring him for wrecking the hand-over agreement that had been agreed with the Chinese government. Cradock and Patten blamed each other publicly a number of times in the final years of British administration of Hong Kong. He once famously denounced Patten as an "incredible shrinking Governor", while Patten mocked him openly, in another occasion, as a "dyspeptic retired ambassador" suffering from "Craddockitis".

Cradock spent his later years in writing a number of books on realpolitik diplomacy and was a non-executive director of the South China Morning Post.

== Early life and education ==
Percy Cradock was born on 26 October 1923 in Byers Green, County Durham, to a farming family. He was educated at Alderman Wraith Grammar School in Spennymoor in his childhood when he experienced the decline of the local mining industry, influencing him to become a devoted supporter of Labour for a long time. He was enlisted in the Royal Air Force during the Second World War, and after that, entered St John's College, Cambridge, being the first ever Cradock to enter university in his family history.

Cradock studied law and English language at Cambridge. His outstanding performance secured him a number of scholarships. From Cambridge he also developed his interest in sinology, by appreciating the works of Chinese and Japanese literature translated by Arthur Waley.

In 1950, he defeated his pro-Conservative opponent, Norman St John-Stevas, to become President of the Cambridge Union Society. He subsequently authored a well-received book of the history of the Society in 1953, covering the period from 1815 to 1939. After obtaining the Master of Arts degree, he remained as a law tutor in his alma mater and further obtained an LL.M. In 1953, he was admitted to the bar by the Middle Temple. In 1982, he was bestowed an honorary fellowship by St John's College.

== Diplomatic career ==
=== Arson attacks on the British Chargé d'affaires Office ===
In 1954, Cradock gave up his academic career in Cambridge and joined the Foreign Office as a late entrant. He served in the London headquarters from 1954 to 1957, and was then posted to the British High Commission in Kuala Lumpur, Malaya (now Malaysia), as First Secretary from 1957 to 1961. He was sent to Hong Kong in 1961 to learn Mandarin, and in the next year became Chinese Secretary of the British Chargé d'affaires Office in Peking, the People's Republic of China. From 1963 to 1966, he was posted back to London, but was sent to Peking for the second time in 1966, serving as political counsellor and officer-in-charge.

Although the political situation in China by then was growing increasingly unstable, Cradock and his colleagues managed to maintain the safety of the office at the onset of the Cultural Revolution. Nevertheless, the situation soon became much worse in 1967, when leftist rioting in mainland China spread to Hong Kong, causing the colonial government to adopt tough measures to suppress a series of leftist demonstrations and strikes. The suppression was generally supported by the local residents of Hong Kong, but anti-British sentiment in mainland China was greatly aroused. Many in Peking were enraged by what they regarded as the "imperialist presence" in China and viewed the British Chargé d'affaires Office as a target to express their anger.

On 22 August 1967, a large group of Red Guards and their followers marched to the Chargé d'affaires Office and surrounded the office building, summoning a "Conference to Condemn the Anti-Chinese Crime Committed by British Imperialists". At night, the Red Guards and the mobs rushed into the office, setting fire to the building and the cars outside. The fire forced the Chargé d'affaires, Sir Donald Hopson, and Cradock to lead the staff and their family members to quickly evacuate the building, and to "surrender" to the mobs. It was reported that Cradock was ordered by the Red Guards to kow-tow to a portrait of Mao Zedong, an act that he firmly refused. During the chaotic scene, Cradock and other British subjects were manhandled, and some of them, both male and female, were sexually harassed before being rescued by the People's Liberation Army. After the rescue, Cradock, Hopson and other British subjects were put under house arrest in the embassy zone in central Peking for months, until the political situation cooled down at the end of 1967.

For his services during and after the chaos, Cradock was appointed a Companion of the Order of St Michael and St George in 1968, and succeeded Hopson as Chargé d'affaires from August 1968 before returning to London in February 1969. Back in London, Cradock became head of the Planning Staff of the Foreign Office from 1969 to 1971, and then an Under-Secretary and head of the Assessments Staff of the Cabinet Office, serving under two Prime Ministers, first, Sir Edward Heath, and secondly, Harold Wilson. Cradock took up his first ambassadorial post from 1976 to 1978 as British Ambassador to East Germany. He also led the British delegation to the Comprehensive Test Ban Discussions in Geneva, Switzerland, from 1977 to 1978.

=== Sino-British negotiations ===
In 1978, Cradock was posted to Peking for the third time to succeed Sir Edward Youde as British Ambassador to the People's Republic of China, a post created in 1972 to supersede the position of Chargé d'affaires.

By then, senior officials in the Hong Kong Government, as well as several land developers in Hong Kong, became aware of the question of the 1997 expiry of the 99-year land lease by China to Britain of the New Territories, contained within the 1898 Sino-British Convention for the Extension of Hong Kong Territory, feeling increasingly uncertain about the future validity of land leases. The colony of Hong Kong was basically made up of Hong Kong Island and Kowloon which were ceded to Britain respectively in 1842 and 1860, and the New Territories, which unlike the first two regions was only leased to the United Kingdom for a 99-year term beginning from 1898. Since the 99-year lease would expire roughly twenty-five years after in 1997, they began to notice that land leases in the New Territories approved by the colonial government might not subsist beyond 1997.

To test the attitude of the Chinese government to the validity of the leases, the Governor, Sir Murray MacLehose, accompanied by the Senior Unofficial Member of the Executive Council, Sir Yuet-keung Kan, and the Political Advisor to the Governor, (later Sir) David Wilson, accepted an invitation from the Chinese government to visit Peking in 1979. The purpose of the visit appeared highly sensitive to the British government. In Hong Kong, only MacLehose, Kan and Wilson knew the purpose of their mission, which was facilitated by Youde in London and Cradock in Peking, and was endorsed by the Foreign Secretary, Dr David Owen. However, unexpectedly, the leader of Communist China, Deng Xiaoping, simply disregarded the question of land leases and firmly insisted on taking over the whole of Hong Kong on or before 1997. The visit ended in dramatically unveiling the prelude of the Sino-British negotiations over the future of Hong Kong.

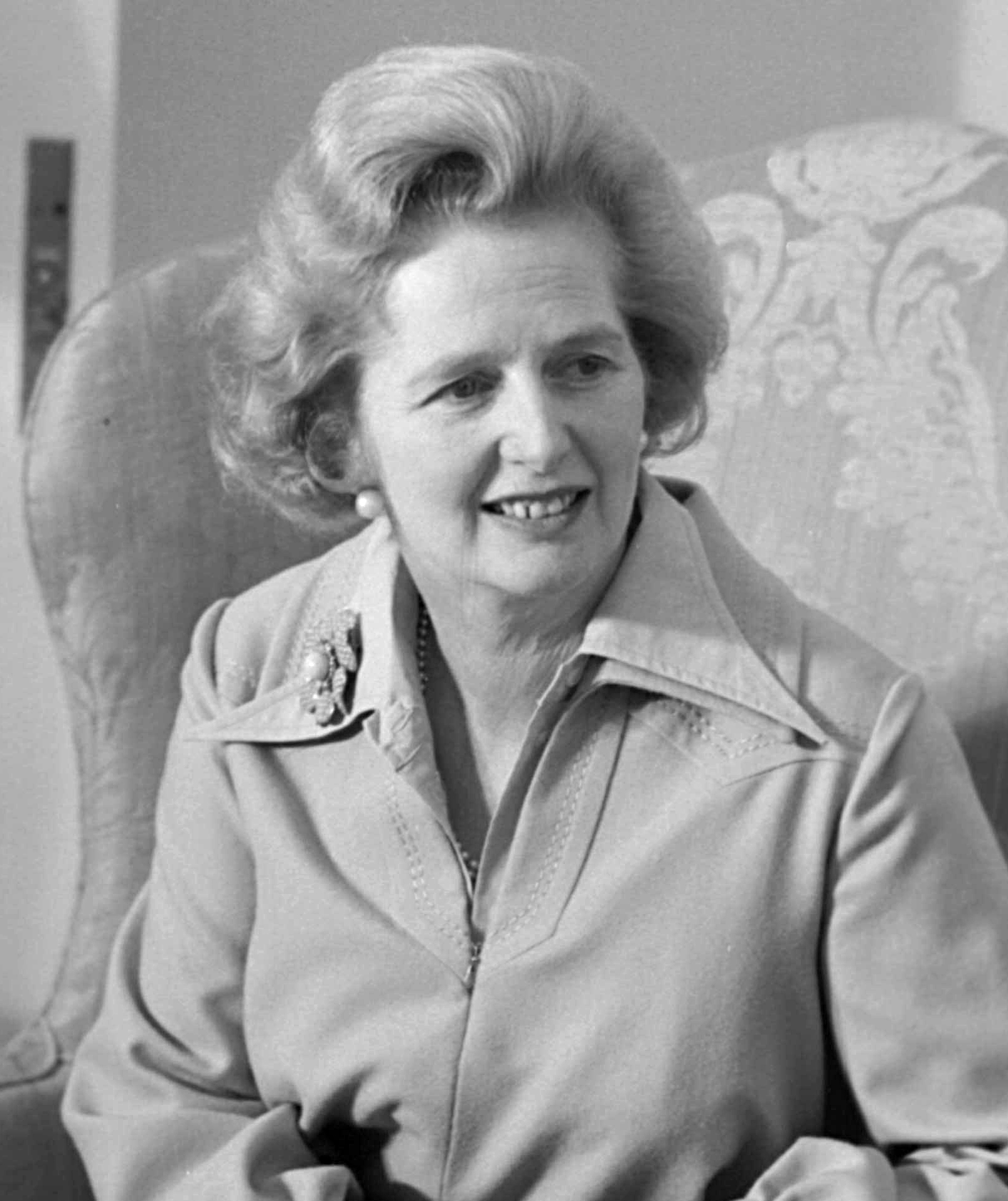
Prime Minister Margaret Thatcher

Following the victory of the Conservatives in the UK General Election in 1979, the new Prime Minister, Margaret Thatcher, adopted a tough line in diplomacy, and the question of Hong Kong was no exception. Not long after the military victory of the United Kingdom over Argentina in the Falklands War, Mrs. Thatcher, accompanied by Cradock and Youde, who was now Governor of Hong Kong, paid a visit to Peking on 22 September 1982 in the hope of persuading the Chinese government not to insist on claiming sovereignty over Hong Kong. During her visit, Thatcher and Cradock discussed the matter with the Chinese leadership, including Chinese Premier Zhao Ziyang and Deng Xiao-ping. Although both sides agreed that a formal negotiation over the future of Hong Kong should be held without delay, their views further clashed on 24 September when Thatcher emphasised in a meeting with Deng in the Great Hall of the People that the Sino-British Treaty of Nanking, Convention of Peking and the Convention for the Extension of Hong Kong Territory were still valid, a fact that was firmly denied by Deng, who instead insisted that China must take over Hong Kong by 1997 regardless of the treaties. When Thatcher, Cradock and Youde left the Great Hall after their meeting with Deng, Thatcher accidentally slipped on the steps outside. The sensational scene was described by the local media as a sign hinting at the defeat of the "Iron Lady" by the "shortie" (i.e. Deng).

Following Thatcher's visit to China, the first round of Sino-British negotiations began in Peking from October 1982 to June 1983 with Cradock as the British chief negotiator. However, due to the heavy clash of views, the negotiations saw little success. Cradock feared that prolonged or broken talks would put China in an advantageous position and would provide it with an excuse to unilaterally decide the future of Hong Kong, at a time when 1997 was rapidly approaching. In this regard, Cradock advised Thatcher to compromise with China so as to let Britain retain some degree of influence over the Hong Kong issue, and one of the major concessions he urged was to stop insisting upon the authority conferred by the three treaties to extend British administration beyond 1997. In a letter to the Chinese authorities towards the end of the first round of negotiations, Thatcher wrote that if the result of the negotiations was accepted by the people of Hong Kong, the British government would recommend Parliament to transfer sovereignty over Hong Kong to China. The letter indicated Thatcher's shift to a softened stance, which paved the way for the second round of negotiations.

In July 1983, the United Kingdom and China began their second round of negotiations in Peking, with Cradock remaining as the British chief negotiator. Other British negotiators included Governor Youde and Political Advisor to the Governor, Robin McLaren. The Chinese negotiation team was first chaired by Yao Guang, later succeeded by Zhou Nan. Similarly to the first round, both sides found each other difficult. During the negotiations, Britain suggested that the sovereignty of Hong Kong could be transferred to China in 1997, but to ensure the prosperity of Hong Kong, Britain should be given the right to rule beyond 1997. This suggestion was heavily criticised by Zhou as "replacing the three unequal treaties by a new one", thus forcing the talks into a stalemate again.

The sign of failure of the United Kingdom in the Sino-British talks and the uncertainty of the future of Hong Kong greatly weakened the confidence of the people of Hong Kong in their future, which in turn provoked a crisis of confidence. In September 1983, the foreign exchange market recorded a sudden fall in the exchange rate of the Hong Kong Dollar against the US Dollar. The fall in value of the Hong Kong Dollar triggered a brief public panic in Hong Kong with crowds rushing to food stalls, trying to buy every available bag of rice, food and other essential daily commodities. To stabilise the Hong Kong Dollar and to rebuild the confidence of the general public, the Hong Kong Government swiftly introduced the Linked Exchange Rate System in October, fixing the exchange rate at HK$7.8 per US Dollar. Nevertheless, the Chinese government accused the Hong Kong Government of deliberately manipulating the fall of the Hong Kong Dollar, and threatened that if the Sino-British talks could not reach a satisfactory outcome within a year, they would unilaterally take the sovereignty of Hong Kong in their own way by 1997.

Cradock was deeply worried that China would leave the negotiating table and act alone. With much effort, he managed to convince the government in November 1983 that the United Kingdom would surrender any claims of sovereignty or power of governance over Hong Kong after 1997. Such a move was generally regarded as the second major concession offered by the United Kingdom. After that, both sides reached consensus over a number of basic principles in the negotiations, including the implementation of "One Country Two Systems" after the transfer of sovereignty, the establishment of the Sino-British Joint Liaison Group before the transfer, and the creation of a new class of British nationality for the British nationals in Hong Kong, mostly ethnic Chinese, without offering them the right of abode in the United Kingdom. Although Cradock was succeeded by Sir Richard Evans as the British chief negotiator in January 1984, Cradock had made most of the agreements which later formed the foundation of the Sino-British Joint Declaration. To acknowledge his critical role in the Sino-British negotiations, he was promoted a Knight Grand Cross of the Order of St Michael and St George in 1983, having been a Knight Commander of the Order of St Michael and St George since 1980.

After rounds of negotiations, the Sino-British Joint Declaration was finally initialled by representatives of both Britain and China on 26 September 1984, and on 19 December, the Joint Declaration was formally signed by Prime Minister Margaret Thatcher and Chinese Premier Zhao Ziyang in the Great Hall of the People. As one of the main draftsmen of the Joint Declaration, Cradock also witnessed the signing in person. However, the Joint Declaration could not bring confidence to the people of Hong Kong. According to an opinion poll conducted shortly afterwards, only 16% of the respondents felt reassured by it, while 76% of the respondents held a reserved attitude. Furthermore, 30% believed that "One Country Two Systems" suggested in the Joint Declaration would be unworkable, showing that the general public of Hong Kong felt insecure and doubtful about the agreement made between Britain and China.

=== Disagreements leading up to 1997 ===
When Cradock, a diplomat fluent in Mandarin, left the Sino-British talks in the end of 1983, it was rumoured that he would succeed Sir Edward Youde as Governor of Hong Kong. Yet, the rumour never turned into reality, and on the contrary, Cradock, who was dubbed "Maggie's Mandarin", and had become a much trusted advisor to Margaret Thatcher, insisted that he should be posted back to London. By then Cradock had reached the diplomatic retirement age of 60, but Thatcher still appointed him as Deputy Under-Secretary of the Foreign Office and Foreign Affairs Advisor to the Prime Minister, responsible for overseeing the Sino-British negotiations. After the signing of the Joint Declaration in December 1984, he was further appointed as Chairman of the Joint Intelligence Committee in 1985, providing military strategic advice to the Prime Minister, while remaining as Foreign Affairs Advisor. Critics have claimed that the reason for Thatcher entrusting him was because both of them regarded the Soviet Union as Britain's biggest adversary, while the United States was the most important ally, and therefore they could always head to the same direction when making diplomatic decisions. Cradock continued to serve as her advisor until the 1987 General Election.

When John Major succeeded Thatcher as the Prime Minister in 1990, Cradock continued to work in 10 Downing Street, but his relationship with Major was not as good as with Thatcher. On 7 February 1991, when Major was holding a cabinet meeting at Number 10, the Provisional IRA launched a mortar bomb attack on the building, breaking all the windows of the conference room. Fortunately, no one in the cabinet meeting, including Cradock, was injured by the terrorist attack.

Since the Joint Declaration was signed in 1984, Hong Kong had entered its last thirteen years of British colonial rule, which was also known as the "transitional period". During the period, China and Britain continued to discuss the details of the transfer of sovereignty of Hong Kong scheduled for 1997. Nevertheless, when the Tiananmen Square crackdown occurred on 4 June 1989, Hong Kong fell into a new series of confidence crises. An unprecedented one million people assembled in downtown Central, expressing their anger towards the Communist regime's military suppression of the peaceful student rally in Peking which was in support of freedom and democracy in China. After the crackdown, the talks between Britain and China came to a halt, with an international boycott of China. In Hong Kong and the United Kingdom, public opinion called for the British government to denounce and abandon the Sino-British Joint Declaration, and many felt worried about transferring Hong Kong from Britain to the Communist regime. Among them, the Senior Unofficial Member of the Executive Council of Hong Kong, Dame Lydia Dunn, even publicly urged Britain not to hand over British subjects in Hong Kong to a regime that "did not hesitate to use its tanks and forces on its own people".

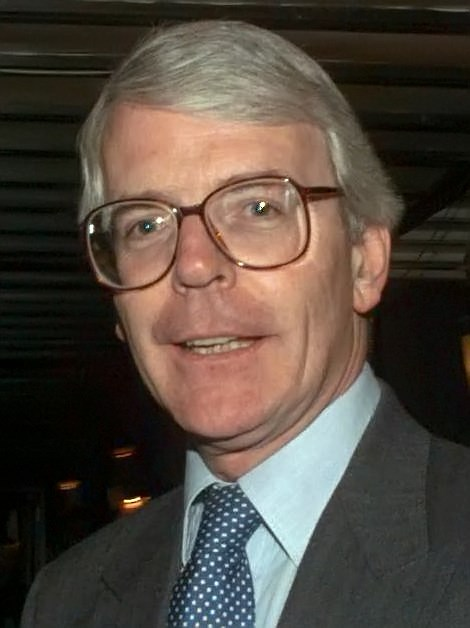
Prime Minister John Major

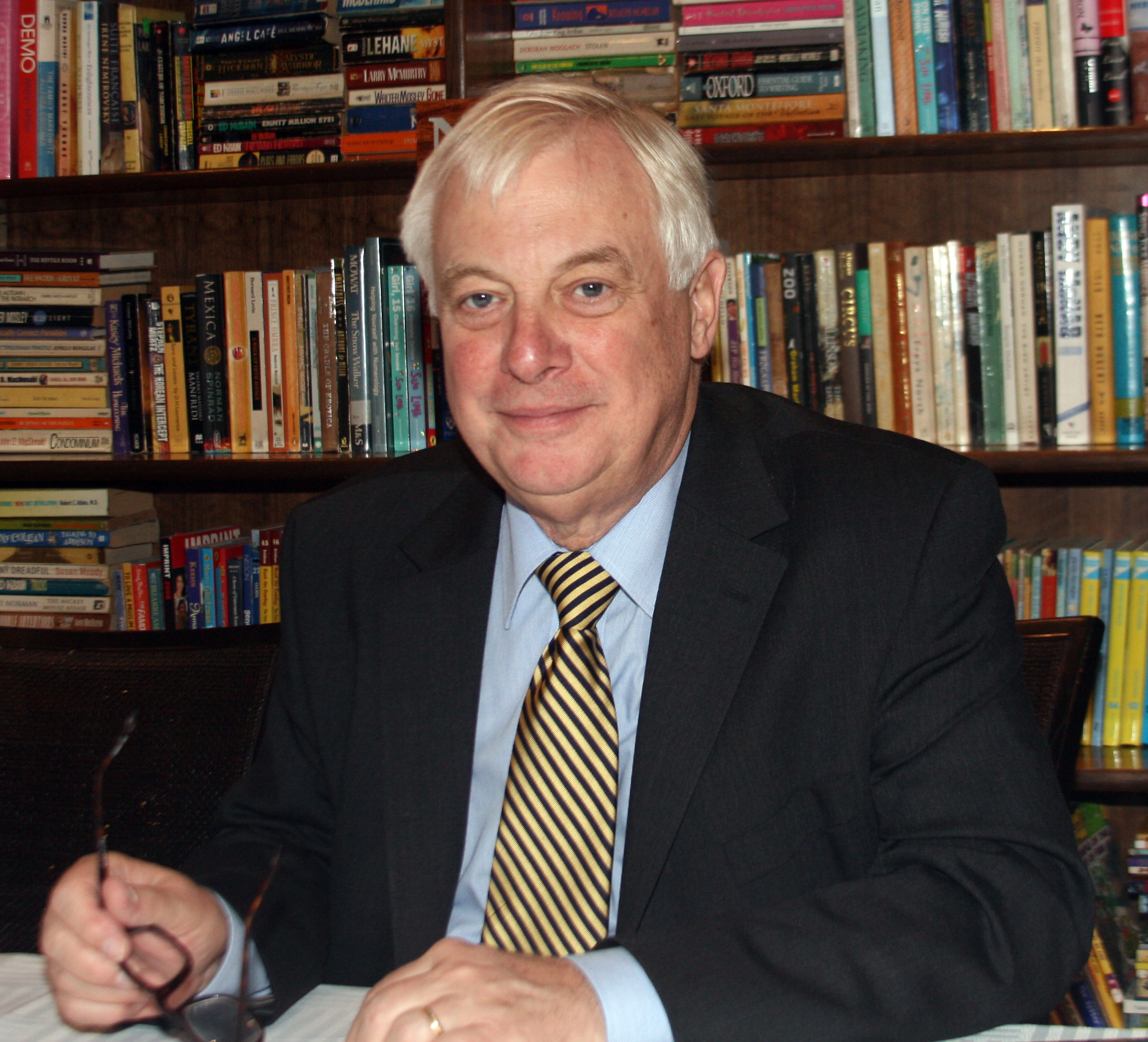
Chris Patten, the last Governor of Hong Kong

Cradock was instructed to visit Peking secretly in the end of 1989, trying to maintain the Joint Declaration and to cool down the Communist antipathy in Hong Kong. In Peking, he tirelessly lobbied China to guarantee a greater degree of freedom and democracy in post-1997 Hong Kong. It was due to his efforts that China agreed to gradually promote democratisation in the future Hong Kong Special Administrative Region by allowing half of the sixty seats of the Legislative Council to be directly elected by 2007, which was duly achieved in 2004. The promise guaranteed by China was subsequently reaffirmed in the Annex II of the Basic Law of Hong Kong promulgated in 1990. With the consent of Britain, any reform of the colonial Legislative Council before 1997 would have to be endorsed by China, so as to allow the colonial legislature a ticket for the so-called "through-train", enabling it to be smoothly transferred to the post-1997 Hong Kong. To accompany this change, Cradock suggested that the post of "Deputy Governor" could be created for the future Chief Executive-elect to let the future leader of Hong Kong get ready for the job before 1997. Cradock believed that these measures would be effective in maintaining the prosperity of Hong Kong, and in the long run, he believed all the seats of the Legislative Council would be directly elected.

Apart from the above measures, to rebuild confidence of the people of Hong Kong towards their future, Governor Sir David Wilson introduced the Airport Core Programme, which was also known as the "Rose Garden Project", in his annual Policy Address to the Legislative Council in October 1989. However, as the projected cost was very high, and the programme would endure beyond 1997, the Chinese government soon critically accused Britain of plotting to use the "Rose Garden Project" to squander Hong Kong's abundant foreign exchange reserves, and of employing a tactic to secretly withdraw the exchange reserves and send them to the United Kingdom. They even threatened that they would not "bless" the project. As a result of the accusations made against it, the British government was anxious to gain the support of China. They secretly sent Cradock to China for several visits in 1990 and 1991, "explaining" the details of the new airport project to the Chinese leadership, and attempted to reassure the Chairman of the Central Military Commission of the Chinese Communist Party Jiang Zemin that the new airport would not bring any harm to China. Despite his reassurance, Jiang insisted that the dispute could not be solved unless Prime Minister John Major visited China to sign a memorandum.

Under pressure from China, Major was forced to visit Peking unwillingly and signed the Memorandum of Understanding Concerning the Construction of the New Airport in Hong Kong and Related Questions with China on 3 September 1991. In the Memorandum, Britain promised to reserve not less than HK$25 billion for the future government of the Hong Kong Special Administrative Region in exchange for the support of China over the Airport Core Programme. Furthermore, Britain agreed in the Memorandum to adopt an effectively 'proactive' attitude to assist in reducing the government debts of Hong Kong after 1997. In fact, Major felt angry about the visit because he became the first Western leader to pay visit to China after the 1989 Tiananmen Square protests and massacre, while the international community was still boycotting China. After the new airport episode, it was felt by the Conservative government that the soft diplomacy previously adopted by Britain in its relations with China was no longer effective, and Major concluded that Cradock and Governor Wilson had been too kind to the Chinese authorities and that they should take responsibility for that approach.

The first to go was Governor Wilson. In the New Year Honours List of 1992, it was unexpectedly announced that he would be made a life peer and be elevated to the House of Lords. Shortly afterwards, although Wilson had three more years before reaching the normal retirement age of 60, the British government suddenly announced that the governorship of Wilson would end soon and not be extended. Unlike the general practice, the British government did not name Wilson's successor as the next Governor of Hong Kong, thus leaving a lot of speculation that Wilson was forced to quit due to his weakness. When Wilson left the governorship in July 1992, he was succeeded by Chris Patten, who was Major's Conservative ally, and had risen to become Chairman of the Conservative Party, and a former Member of the Parliament who was recently defeated in the general election. A few months later, the British government announced that Cradock was to step down as Chairman of the Joint Intelligence Committee and Foreign Affairs Advisor. In the announcement, the government left no compliments to Cradock, signifying the discontent of Major.

Soon after assuming the governorship, Patten adopted a tougher line with China, which was at complete variance with that of his predecessors. In his first Policy Address issued in October 1992, he vowed that all the seats of the Legislative Council would be directly and democratically elected in 1995, which would be the last election to precede the 1997 handover, with a view to accelerate the pace of democratisation of Hong Kong and to protect the fundamental human rights of the Hong Kong people. Even though his decision was welcomed by public opinion in both Hong Kong and Britain, Patten put himself in an unstable and confrontational relationship with China. When his political reform package was passed by the Legislative Council in 1994, the Chinese government decided to terminate the originally planned "through-train" arrangement, and to set up their own Provisional Legislative Council unilaterally, affirming that the colonial Legislative Council would not survive after 1997. Also, the planned creation of the post of "Deputy Governor" was aborted.

Patten was much blamed by the Chinese authorities for his democratic reform, with the Director of the Hong Kong and Macao Affairs Office of the State Council of the People's Republic of China, Lu Ping, once famously denouncing him as a "sinner to be condemned for thousands of years". In the quarrel between Patten and the Chinese government, Cradock stood firmly against Patten and criticised him on many occasions, blaming him for damaging the planned road-map which had been endorsed by both the British and Chinese governments. In 1995, Cradock publicly said in an interview that "He [referring to Patten] has made himself so obnoxious to the Chinese" and later, on another occasion, he described Patten as the "incredible shrinking Governor". Yet Patten did not remain silent, and struck back in a Legislative Council meeting, publicly ridiculing Cradock as a "dyspeptic retired ambassador". From 1992 to 1997, both Cradock and Patten criticised each other on many occasions, which placed them on increasingly bad terms. Although Cradock was invited by the British government to attend the ceremony of the transfer of sovereignty of Hong Kong on 30 June 1997, Cradock felt that they would not like him to be there and turned down the invitation.

== Later years ==
Cradock was appointed a Privy Councillor in 1993. From 1996 to 2000, he was a non-executive director of the South China Morning Post. In his later years, he lived in Richmond in southwest London, spending much of the time writing books on the Sino-British negotiations and realpolitik diplomacy. He suffered from ill health and died in London on 22 January 2010, aged 86. His funeral took place at St Mary's Church, Twickenham, in western London on 6 February 2010. Some of his former colleagues, such as former Chief Secretary of Hong Kong, Sir David Akers-Jones, were grieved over his death, but others like the founding chairman of the Democratic Party of Hong Kong Martin Lee commented adversely by saying "I don't think he was Hong Kong's friend".

== Controversies ==
The two major retreats of Cradock and his compromising attitude in the Sino-British negotiation aroused considerable controversies at that time. Cradock defended his actions on the grounds that he acted from a realist point of view and he thought that the United Kingdom actually had "no card" on hand and had little bargaining power at all. The main reasons were firstly, that Hong Kong itself must continue to rely on the provision of fresh water and food from mainland China, and secondly, that the British Armed Forces stationed in Hong Kong were too weak to defend Hong Kong from the Chinese military, and thirdly, to sustain Hong Kong's prosperity and economic development in future, Britain must co-operate with China. From the legal point of view, Cradock believed that since the Convention for the Extension of Hong Kong Territory would expire in 1997, Britain would no longer be able to govern Hong Kong effectively thereafter because the New Territories would have to be returned to China even though Hong Kong Island and Kowloon would not, and that was one of the main reasons why he advised Thatcher to compromise with China. He concluded that the solution that would best serve the interests of Hong Kong was to prevent China from acting unilaterally and to fight for the interests of the Hong Kong people within a limited and mutually agreed framework.

However, the attitude of Cradock was heavily criticised. After the Sino-British Joint Declaration was signed, general public opinion in Hong Kong and Britain was that it could not rebuild the confidence of the Hong Kong people towards their future. Many critics even denounced Britain and the Joint Declaration as betraying the Hong Kong people and the future of Hong Kong. Among them, The Economist news magazine claimed that both Cradock and Thatcher were no different from former Prime Minister Neville Chamberlain who betrayed Czechoslovakia to Nazi Germany by signing the Munich Agreement with Adolf Hitler in 1938. Apart from that, some commentators suggested that Cradock had no reason to concur with China's view on the validity of the three treaties because under the general practice of international law, one must conclude a new treaty to invalidate and replace the old one, and therefore the three treaties were actually still in force.

It was also claimed that Cradock was indeed not a liberal because he and the British government did not act for the interests of Hong Kong on the negotiating table. In fact, the British government believed that maintaining a friendly Sino-British relationship was of the utmost importance in preserving British business interests in China. To give up Hong Kong in exchange for a long-term friendship with China was regarded as profitable especially to the business sector in the United Kingdom. In addition, as the Joint Declaration was designed to bring stability to Hong Kong, it effectively closed the "back door" of entry into the United Kingdom and therefore avoided a possible influx of 3 million British subjects of Hong Kong to seek asylum or right of abode there.

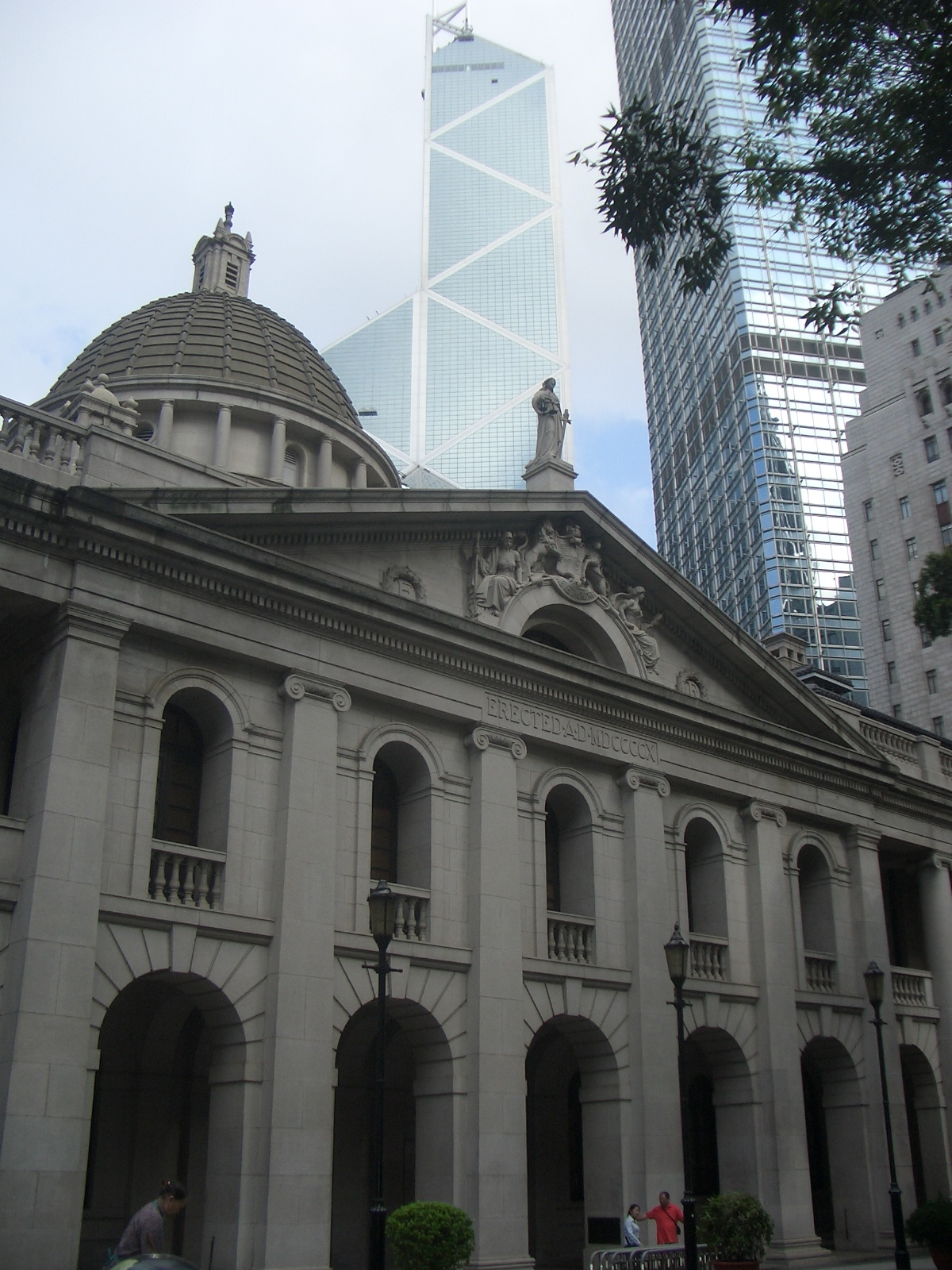
Hong Kong Legislative Council

Cradock was a bitter critic of Governor Patten's political and democratic reform programme, blaming him for enraging the Chinese government, for which he thought Patten should be held responsible. He also blamed the implementation of the reform programme for damaging the agreed "through-train" arrangement and other transitional arrangements, and that it would only bring adverse effect to the democratisation of post-1997 Hong Kong. Nevertheless, his pro-Beijing standpoint attracted much opposition and criticism in both Hong Kong and the United Kingdom. The mainstream public opinion at that time was that the memory of the Tiananmen crackdown was still vividly in the mind of many Hong Kong people, and that was why Britain had the responsibility to adequately safeguard human rights in Hong Kong, and to show support for Patten's political reform. Even though the colonial legislature would not survive after 1997, many thought that his reform was worthwhile for Hong Kong to experience the benefits resulting from a democratically elected Legislative Council, and to give a voice to the discontent of the Hong Kong public to the Chinese government by voting in the election. The Foreign Affairs Select Committee of the House of Commons also stated that it would be disreputable for the United Kingdom to not introduce political reform in response to the demand of the people of Hong Kong.

Although Governor Patten's political reform was generally supported in Hong Kong, Cradock insisted that if Britain stood against China, Britain would find it very difficult to bargain for Hong Kong any more. In an interview in 1996 with The Common Sense, a documentary produced by the Radio Television Hong Kong, Cradock claimed that the United Kingdom nearly lost all her influence over China because the two countries had been in political dispute. When asked if his attitude was equal to "kow-tow" to China, he admittedly replied that no matter whether the Hong Kong people were willing or not, Hong Kong must be handed over to China in 1997. He advised the people of Hong Kong that to build a harmonious relationship with China was always better than confrontation and expressing discontent. On the other hand, he also called for the Hong Kong people to face the reality and not to believe in any illusion and false hope of democracy brought forward by Chris Patten. When asked if he was advising the Hong Kong people to obey China on everything, he said that the people of Hong Kong should know who their "Master" was and what they could do was to try their best to convince the Chinese authority to follow what was written in the Joint Declaration, but he reiterated that most importantly, they must face the reality.

In response to Cradock's criticisms on the political reform, Governor Patten struck back on a number of occasions, and in the Legislative Council meeting on 13 July 1995, he publicly mocked Cradock and those who appeased with China as suffering from "Craddockitis":

I think that we suffer in Hong Kong from an epidemic of what we call at home, Craddockitis, and it is something which affects not just dyspeptic retired ambassadors; it clearly goes wider than that. And there are a number of ingredients to the disease, a number of symptoms. There is a belief that one has a monopoly of virtue, a belief that one has a monopoly of wisdom about what is right for Hong Kong, a belief that one has a monopoly of concern about the things which have made Hong Kong so special, and a belief that unless everybody else agrees with you and follows your own analysis, that, as far as Hong Kong is concerned, is the end of the road. Hong Kong is doomed unless people always agree with you. Those are some of the symptoms of this epidemic.

Though Cradock was on bad terms with Patten, he was highly valued by the Chinese government and the pro-Beijing camp. They generally praised him for playing a vital role in the making of the Sino-British Joint Declaration. The Xinhua News Agency, the official news agency of the Chinese authority, once described Cradock as a "friend of China and an experienced British diplomat who at the same time bears in mind to safeguard the interests of his country…History has proved his sincerity and objectivity."

== Personal life ==
From 1953, Cradock was married to Birthe Marie Dyrlund, who also worked in the Foreign Office. They had no children. Lady Cradock died in September 2016. Cradock was a member of the Reform Club.

== Bibliography ==
- Recollections of the Cambridge Union: 1815–1939 (Bowes & Bowes, 1953)
- Experiences of China (John Murray, 1994) ISBN 9780719553493
- In Pursuit of British Interests (John Murray, 1997) ISBN 9780719554643
- Know Your Enemy (John Murray, 2002) ISBN 9780719560484

== Honours ==
- Companion of the Order of St Michael and St George (1968 New Year Honours)
- Knight Commander of the Order of St Michael and St George (1980 Birthday Honours)
- Knight Grand Cross of the Order of St Michael and St George (1983 Birthday Honours)
- Privy Counsellor (1993 New Year Honours sworn 9 February 1993)

=== Honorary fellowship ===
- St John's College, Cambridge (1982)

== See also ==
- Handover of Hong Kong
- Sino-British Joint Declaration
- Margaret Thatcher
- Chris Patten
- David Akers-Jones

== Footnotes ==
Government offices
Preceded by Sir Donald Hopson	Chargé d'affaires, Peking; 1968–1969	Succeeded by John Denson
Preceded by Sir Edward Youde	British Ambassador to the People's Republic of China; 1978–1983	Succeeded by Sir Richard Evans
Preceded by Sir Patrick Wright	Chairman of the Joint Intelligence Committee; 1985–1992	Succeeded by Sir Rodric Braithwaite
