= Hong Kong Act 1985 =

Act of the Parliament of the United Kingdom

Hong Kong Act 1985 (Note: Section 2(1).)
- Act of Parliament
- Parliament of the United Kingdom
- Long title: An Act to make provision for and in connection with the ending of British sovereignty and jurisdiction over Hong Kong.
- Citation: 1985 c. 15
- Introduced by: Sir Geoffrey Howe, Secretary of State for Foreign and Commonwealth Affairs (Commons); Lord Waddington, the Minister of State, Home Office (Lords)
- Territorial extent: United Kingdom; Hong Kong

Dates
- Royal assent: 4 April 1985
- Commencement: 4 April 1985 (except section 1) (Note: Section 4(b) of the Interpretation Act 1978.); 27 May 1985 (section 1) (Note: Section 1(2). The instruments of ratification of the Sino-British Joint Declaration were exchanged on 27 May 1985, as notified in the London Gazette on 6 June 1985.)
Other legislation
Relates to	British Nationality Act 1981; Diplomatic Privileges Act 1964

Status: Current legislation

Text of statute as originally enacted

Revised text of statute as amended

Text of the Hong Kong Act 1985 as in force today (including any amendments) within the United Kingdom, from legislation.gov.uk.

The Hong Kong Act 1985 (c. 15) is an act of the Parliament of the United Kingdom that made provision for the ratification of the Sino-British Joint Declaration that was signed on 19 December 1984 in Beijing that agreed to end British sovereignty and jurisdiction over the then British dependent territory of Hong Kong to the People's Republic of China after 1 July 1997. It was given royal assent by Queen Elizabeth II on 4 April 1985.

== Background ==
British sovereignty over Hong Kong started when they gained perpetual control over Hong Kong Island in the Treaty of Nanking after the First Opium War. In 1898, the United Kingdom and Qing China signed the Convention for the Extension of Hong Kong Territory which leased the New Territories to the UK for 99 years. In the 1980s, the UK negotiated with the People's Republic of China over the lease. With the Chinese refusing to accept an extension of the lease or further British administration, as well as logistical impracticalities about retaining the non-leased parts of the territory, the Sino-British Joint Declaration was signed to state that Hong Kong would be handed over to China on the expiration of the lease. Due to it not being a self-executing treaty, the Hong Kong Act 1985 was needed to bring it into force.

== Provisions ==
Section 1(1) of the act provided that, as from 1 July 1997, the Queen would no longer have sovereignty or jurisdiction over any part of Hong Kong. Section 1(2) provided that section 1 would come into force on the exchange of instruments of ratification of the Joint Declaration, with notice of the date of the exchange to be given in the London Gazette. Section 2 of the act provided the short title and gave effect to the schedule.

Paragraph 1 of the schedule defined "the relevant date" as 1 July 1997. Paragraph 2 allowed the Queen to make provision by Order in Council, subject to the approval of a draft by each House of Parliament, that British Dependent Territories citizenship could not be retained or acquired on or after the relevant date by virtue of a connection with Hong Kong, and that persons who held it by virtue of such a connection could acquire a new form of British nationality, to be known as British National (Overseas). Such an order could include provision amending the British Nationality Act 1981.

Paragraph 3 of the schedule allowed the Queen by Order in Council to repeal or amend any enactment so far as it was part of the law of Hong Kong, to enable the legislature of Hong Kong to do the same and to make laws with extra-territorial operation, and to repeal or amend, so far as it related to Hong Kong, any enactment forming part of the law of the United Kingdom or of a British possession other than Hong Kong. Paragraph 4 provided that the Diplomatic Privileges Act 1964 would have effect as if the references in schedule 1 to that act to a diplomatic agent included any person designated by the government of the People's Republic of China as a member of the Joint Liaison Group set up under the Joint Declaration.

== Citizenship ==
At the time of the act's passage, Hong Kongers were British Dependent Territories citizens. The Hong Kong Act's passage meant that after 1 July 1997, Hong Kongers would lose that status, unless they had a connection to another BDT, and would become Chinese nationals. As a result, the act created British National (Overseas) status as an optional citizenship for Hong Kongers that wished to retain a form of British nationality for life. BNOs did not have the same right of abode as BDT citizenship. During the 1990s, the Governor of Hong Kong, Chris Patten regularly asked the British government to grant full right of abode to Hong Kongers before the handover.

In 2020, following the passage of the Hong Kong national security law, the United Kingdom relaxed border controls on BNOs and their immediate family in order to grant them a direct pathway to British citizenship. In response, China declared that they would no longer recognise British National (Overseas) passports.

== Subsequent developments ==
The power in paragraph 2 of the schedule was used to make the Hong Kong (British Nationality) Order 1986 (SI 1986/948), which provided for the new status of British National (Overseas) and came into operation on 1 July 1987. Under section 1(1) of the act, the Crown ceased to have sovereignty or jurisdiction over any part of Hong Kong on 1 July 1997, the date of the Handover of Hong Kong.

== See also ==
- Treaty of Nanking
- Convention of Peking
- Convention for the Extension of Hong Kong Territory
- Newfoundland Act 1949
- 1961 British Cameroons referendum
- Malaysia Act 1963
