= John Denson =

British diplomat (1926–1992)

John Denson CMG OBE

British Ambassador to Nepal
- In office 1977–1983
- Preceded by: Sir Michael Scott
- Succeeded by: Sir Anthony Hurrell

British Chargé d'Affaires to China
- In office 1969–1971
- Preceded by: Sir Percy Cradock
- Succeeded by: Sir John Addis

Personal details
- Born: 13 August 1926 Sunderland
- Died: 24 April 1992 (aged 65)
- Education: St John's College, Cambridge
- Occupation: Diplomat

John Boyd Denson (13 August 1926 – 24 April 1992) was a British diplomat who served as chargé d'affaires to China from 1969 to 1971 and ambassador to Nepal from 1977 to 1983.

== Early life and education ==
Denson was born on 13 August 1926 at Sunderland, the son of George Denson and Alice Denson (née Boyd). He was educated at The Perse School and St John's College, Cambridge.

== Career ==
During World War II Denson served with the Royal Artillery from 1944 until 1946 when he was commissioned into the Intelligence Corps, and sent to Malaya to interrogate Japanese POWs. He then spent three years at Cambridge taking English and Oriental Languages Triposes before he joined the Foreign Service in 1951.

Denson served in various posts including at Hong Kong; Tokyo; Peking; Helsinki; Washington; and Vientiane. From 1965 to 1968, he worked at the Foreign Office as assistant head of the Far Eastern Department and was involved in the negotiations which led to the de-recognition by Britain of the nationalist government in Formosa.

From 1969 to 1971, Denson served as charge d’affaires at Peking, and oversaw a considerable improvement in Sino-British relations which led to the appointment in 1972 of the first British Ambassador to the People's Republic of China, John Addis, who succeeded him. During his first year, he assisted in the release of Reuters journalist, Anthony Grey who had been held under house arrest in Peking for over two years. Then after spending a year on sabbatical at the Royal College of Defence Studies, Denson was counsellor and consul-general at Athens from 1973 to 1977. He was appointed Ambassador to Nepal in 1977, a post he held until his retirement in 1983.

== Personal life and death ==
Denson married Joyce Myra Symondson, also a diplomat, in 1957. There were no children.

Denson died on 24 April 1992, aged 65.

== Honours ==
Denson was appointed Companion of the Order of St Michael and St George (CMG) in the 1972 Birthday Honours, and Officer of the Order of the British Empire (OBE) in the 1965 New Year Honours. In 1980, he was awarded the Order of Gorkha Dakshina Bahu, First Class, by the King of Nepal.

== See also ==
- China–United Kingdom relations
- Nepal–United Kingdom relations

Diplomatic posts
Preceded by Sir Percy Cradock	British Chargé d'Affaires to China; 1969–1971	Succeeded by Sir John Addis
Preceded by Sir Michael Scott	British Ambassador to Nepal; 1977–1983	Succeeded by Sir Anthony Hurrell
