= George Falconer =

George Falconer may refer to:

- George Falconer (footballer) (1946–2013), Scottish footballer
- George Falconer (diplomat) (1894–1981), British diplomat who served ambassador to Nepal
