= Richard Morris (diplomat) =

British diplomat (1967–2020)

Richard Morris FRSA
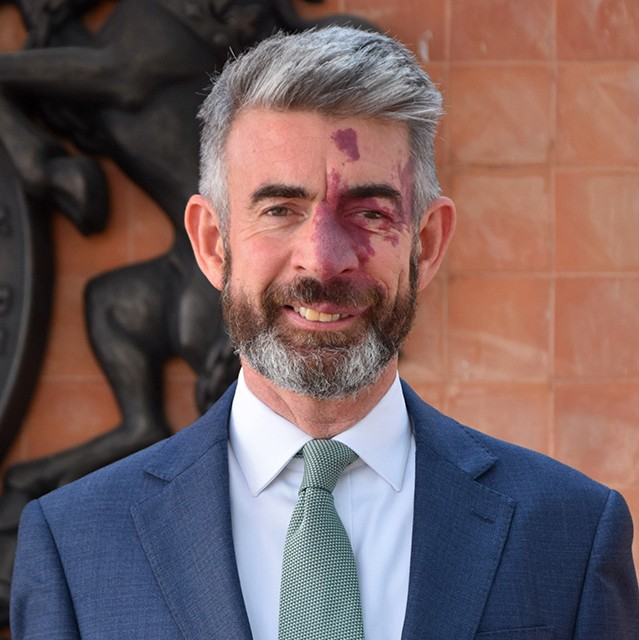

British Ambassador to Nepal
- In office 2015–2019
- Monarch: Elizabeth II
- Prime Minister: David Cameron; Theresa May
- Preceded by: John Rankin
- Succeeded by: Nicola Pollitt

Personal details
- Born: 1 November 1967 Droitwich Spa, Worcestershire, England
- Died: c. 6 May 2020 (aged 52) Hampshire, England
- Cause of death: Suicide
- Spouse: Alison Waring (m. 1992)
- Children: 3
- Education: Droitwich Spa High School
- Alma mater: Aberystwyth University (BA Hons); Aston University (MBA)

Richard Charles Morris FRSA (1 November 1967 – c. 6 May 2020) was a British diplomat who served as British Ambassador to Nepal from 2015 to 2019. He was reported missing after going for a run in Hampshire in May 2020, and his body was identified four months later. An inquest heard he had been "extremely stressed" before his death. An inquiry into his death found he had died of suicide.

== Early and personal life ==
Morris was born on 1 November 1967 in Droitwich Spa, Worcestershire, to John and Kathleen Morris. He had a younger sister and attended Droitwich Spa High School.

Morris was born with a port-wine stain birthmark on the left hand side of his face. He underwent laser surgery in an attempt to remove his birthmark as a young teenager, but the procedure was eventually halted. He became an ambassador for the charity Changing Faces, which helps people who live with visible facial differences.

Morris studied at Aberystwyth University, which included a one-year scholarship at the University of Illinois in the United States, receiving a BA Hons degree in English literature. He then studied at Aston University, where he earned an MBA degree and underwent contract work for the management consultancy Touche Ross.

Morris married his wife Alison Waring in 1992 and together had three children, one daughter and two sons. His hobbies included long-distance running, and he completed a marathon on Mount Everest in 2019.

== Career ==
Morris entered the Foreign and Commonwealth Office (FCO) through an open competition in 1990.

Morris served as the British consul-general in Sydney, and held roles in New York, Mexico City, Bridgetown and Ottawa. He was head of the Pacific department at the FCO from 2013 to 2015.

In October 2015 he was announced as the next British Ambassador to Nepal, to succeed John Rankin in November. He served in this role until 2019, during which time he hosted Prince Harry, Duke of Sussex, on a tour in 2016. He was due to become the next British High Commissioner to Fiji in July 2020.

== Death ==
Morris was reported missing on 6 May 2020 after leaving his house in Bentley, Hampshire, for a run and not returning home. That day, an appeal for information was issued by Hampshire Constabulary.

Police dogs and drones were deployed and used to search Alice Holt Forest, where Morris was known to enjoy running. CCTV footage was examined and door-to-door inquiries were carried out. The search was scaled back on 3 June after more than 9 square kilometres (3.5 sq mi) had been searched. Chief Inspector Alex Reading said that he wanted to "reassure the community that there is no evidence of foul play".

On 31 August, a body was found in Alice Holt Forest by a member of the public, and was identified as that of Morris by Hampshire Constabulary on 16 September. His cause of death was undetermined after an initial autopsy. An inquest heard that Morris had been "extremely stressed" while working on the case of Harry Dunn and as a member of a government task force addressing the COVID-19 pandemic in the United Kingdom. His wife stated that he had been working 15-hour days and on weekends, and suffered from frequent night sweats.

An inquiry into his death found he had died of suicide.

Diplomatic posts
Preceded by John Rankin	British Ambassador to Nepal; 2015–2019	Succeeded by Nicola Pollitt
