= Newfoundland Act =

Act of Parliament of the United Kingdom

British North America Act 1949 (Note: Section 3.)
- Act of Parliament
- Parliament of the United Kingdom
- Long title: An Act to confirm and give effect to Terms of Union agreed between Canada and Newfoundland
- Citation: 12, 13 & 14 Geo. 6. c. 22
- Territorial extent: United Kingdom; Dominion of Newfoundland; Dominion of Canada

Dates
- Royal assent: 23 March 1949
- Commencement: 23 March 1949 (Note: The Acts of Parliament (Commencement) Act 1793.)
Other legislation
Amends	Newfoundland Act 1933
Amended by	Statute Law (Repeals) Act 1969

Status: Amended

Text of statute as originally enacted

Text of the British North America Act 1949 as in force today (including any amendments) within the United Kingdom, from legislation.gov.uk.

The Newfoundland Act was an act of the Parliament of the United Kingdom that confirmed and gave effect to the Terms of Union agreed to between the then-separate Dominions of Canada and Newfoundland on 23 March 1949. It was originally titled the British North America Act 1949 (12, 13 & 14 Geo. 6. c. 22), but was renamed in Canada on the patriation of the Canadian Constitution from the United Kingdom in 1982.

In exchange for Newfoundland becoming a province, the Canadian government took over the Newfoundland Railway, Newfoundland Airport (now Gander International Airport), public broadcasting, telegraph services and other services that fell under federal control. The federal government assumed responsibility for Newfoundland's debt.

Newfoundland was also given statutory subsidies, a special subsidy of $1.1 million, the right to enter into tax rental agreements with the federal government and an additional transitional grant of $3.5 million, diminishing by 10 per cent per year for a total of 12 years. Also, as a safety net, it was agreed a royal commission would review finances.

== Amendments ==
After patriation, the Newfoundland Act has been amended four times through the Canadian constitutional amendment formulas.

List of amendments to the Newfoundland Act
Name	Section(s) amended	Purpose and notes	Amending procedure
Constitution Amendment, 1987	s. 3 of Newfoundland Act and term 17 of schedule to that Act	Extended education rights to the Pentecostal Church in Newfoundland. Replaced by Constitution Amendment, 1998 (Newfoundland Act).	s. 43: House of Commons, Senate and Newfoundland House of Assembly
Constitution Amendment, 1997 (Newfoundland Act)	term 17 of schedule to Newfoundland Act	Allowed the Province of Newfoundland to create a secular school system to replace the church-based education system.	s. 43: House of Commons and Newfoundland House of Assembly; Senate approval was bypassed with s. 47
Constitution Amendment, 1998 (Newfoundland Act)	term 17 of schedule to Newfoundland Act	Ended denominational quotas for Newfoundland religion classes.	s. 43: House of Commons, Senate and Newfoundland House of Assembly
Constitution Amendment, 2001 (Newfoundland and Labrador)	every instance of the word "Newfoundland" in the schedule to Newfoundland Act	Changed the name of the "Province of Newfoundland" to the "Province of Newfoundland and Labrador".	s. 43: House of Commons, Senate and Newfoundland House of Assembly

== Previous Newfoundland Acts ==
Prior to the 1949 act there were a handful of acts with revisions to the Newfoundland's Constitution:

Trade to Newfoundland Act 1698
- Act of Parliament
- Parliament of England
- Long title: An Act to Incourage the Trade to Newfoundland.
- Citation: 10 Will. 3 c. 14 (Note: This is the citation in The Statutes of the Realm.); 10 & 11 Will. 3. c. 25 (Note: This is the citation in The Statutes at Large.)
- Territorial extent: England and Wales

Dates
- Royal assent: 4 May 1699
- Commencement: 6 December 1698 (Note: Start of session.)
- Repealed: 15 July 1867
Other legislation
Amended by	Customs Law Repeal Act 1825
Repealed by	Statute Law Revision Act 1867

Status: Repealed

Text of statute as originally enacted

- Newfoundland Act 1698 (10 Will. 3 c. 14) – encourage and established trade (fisheries) links in the region; also called King William's Act

Newfoundland Act 1832 (Note: The citation of this act by this short title was authorised by section 1 of, and the first schedule to, the Short Titles Act 1896. Due to the repeal of those provisions it is now authorised by section 19(2) of the Interpretation Act 1978.)
- Act of Parliament
- Parliament of the United Kingdom
- Long title: An Act to continue certain Acts relating to the Island of Newfoundland, and to provide for the Appropriation of all Duties which may hereafter be raised within the said Island.
- Citation: 2 & 3 Will. 4. c. 78
- Territorial extent: United Kingdom

Dates
- Royal assent: 1 August 1832
- Commencement: 1 August 1832
Other legislation
Amends	Newfoundland Act 1824; Marriages Confirmation (Newfoundland) Act 1824; Newfoundland Fisheries, etc. Act 1829
Amended by	Statute Law Revision Act 1874

Status: Amended

Text of statute as originally enacted

- Newfoundland Act 1832 (2 & 3 Will. 4. c. 78)

Newfoundland Act 1842
- Act of Parliament
- Parliament of the United Kingdom
- Long title: An Act for amending the Constitution of the Government of Newfoundland.
- Citation: 5 & 6 Vict. c. 120
- Territorial extent: United Kingdom

Dates
- Royal assent: 12 August 1842
- Commencement: 12 August 1842
- Repealed: 29 July 1959
Other legislation
Amended by	Statute Law Revision Act 1874 (No. 2)
Repealed by	Statute Law Revision Act 1959

Status: Repealed

Text of statute as originally enacted

- Newfoundland Act 1842 (5 & 6 Vict. c. 120) – established an appointed upper Legislative Council and elected lower House of Assembly

Newfoundland Act 1933 (Note: Section 6.)
- Act of Parliament
- Parliament of the United Kingdom
- Long title: An Act to empower His Majesty to issue Letters Patent making provision with respect to the administration of Newfoundland, to authorise the making out of public moneys of advances to the Government of Newfoundland and the guaranteeing by the Treasury of stock to be issued by that Government, and to amend the Colonial Development Act, 1929, in its application to Newfoundland.
- Citation: 24 & 25 Geo. 5. c. 2
- Territorial extent: United Kingdom

Dates
- Royal assent: 21 December 1933
- Commencement: 21 December 1933
- Repealed: 1 January 1970
Other legislation
Amends	Colonial Development Act 1929
Repealed by	British North America Act 1949; Statute Law (Repeals) Act 1969

Status: Repealed

Text of statute as originally enacted

- Newfoundland Act 1933 (24 & 25 Geo. 5. c. 2) – suspended responsible government with the General Assembly of Newfoundland dissolved and established rule by Newfoundland Commission

== See also ==
- Malaysia Act 1963
- Hong Kong Act 1985
