= Zhou Nan =

Chinese politician and diplomat

- 周南

7th Director of the Xinhua News Agency Hong Kong Branch
- In office January 1990 – July 1997
- Preceded by: Xu Jiatun
- Succeeded by: Jiang Enzhu

2nd Chinese Ambassador to the United Nations
- In office October 1980 – November 1981

Personal details
- Born: November 4, 1927 (age 98) Changchun, Jilin Province, China
- Party: Chinese Communist Party
- Spouse: Huang Guo

Zhou Nan (Chinese: 周南; pinyin: Zhōu Nán; born 4 November 1927) is a prominent Chinese politician and diplomat, and served as Director of the Xinhua News Agency in Hong Kong, Vice Minister of the People's Republic of China's Ministry of Foreign Affairs, and Ambassador to the United Nations. He was also a member of the Standing Committee of the 7th and 8th National People's Congress, and a member of the 14th Central Committee of the CPC. He is best known as China's delegation head and main representative during negotiations for the handover of Hong Kong and the handover of Macau.

== Early years and education ==
Zhou was born in November 1927 in Changchun, Jilin Province under the name of Gao Qinglian. He was the youngest of the five children born to Gao Guozhu, the magistrate of Anda County in Heilongjiang Province, and his second wife Wang Yunzhi. Just before the Japanese invasion of Manchuria, the family moved to the city of Tianjin, where at age 14, Gao enrolled at Tianjin's Yaohua High School. Upon graduation, he attended Beijing University from 1944 to 1948, majoring in philosophy. In 1949, he was appointed Head of the English Department at Beijing Foreign Studies University.

== Early political career ==
In April 1946, Gao Qingzong formally entered the Chinese Communist Party under the nom de guerre (or Party name) "Zhou Nan", a poet from the Song dynasty. Party members at the time were advised to go by aliases or false names to protect themselves from KMT persecution. From then on, he made his name change official and became formally known as Zhou Nan. During the Korean War, Zhou served as the Chief of the Political Bureau of the People's Volunteer Army, and interrogated captured POW's. In 1951, he joined the Foreign Service and took up a post as the Third Secretary and later Second Secretary at the newly created Chinese Embassy in Pakistan. After serving in Pakistan for four years, Zhou returned to Beijing in 1955 as Section Chief of the Department of West Asian and North African Affairs. During the Cultural Revolution, He was later appointed First Secretary at the Chinese Embassy in Tanzania, where he served until 1973.

== Career as Ambassador to the United Nations ==
In 1973, Zhou Nan became First Secretary and Counsellor of the People's Republic of China's first ever delegation to the United Nations. He was made the PRC's official ambassador to the U.N. in 1980. After serving twelve years on the Chinese delegation, Zhou returned from New York in the 1983 to engage in preliminary talks with the British government regarding the return of the then British-administered Hong Kong to Chinese rule.

== Career as Vice Foreign Minister ==
Zhou Nan was promoted to the office of Vice Minister of the Ministry of Foreign Affairs in 1984. His primary task was to spearhead the Chinese delegation to negotiate the handover of Hong Kong with the British Foreign Ministry. Replacing his former superior Yao Guang, whose lack of progress the PRC government had become disenchanted with, Zhou remained in constant talks with the British delegation for 13 years until the official handover of Hong Kong in 1997. On September 26, 1984, Zhou Nan and British delegation head Sir Richard Evans initialed the important Sino-British Joint Declaration (中英联合声明) at the Great Hall of the People in Beijing. It was later formally signed by the British Prime Minister Margaret Thatcher and the Chinese Premier Zhao Ziyang again in the Great Hall of the People on 19 December 1984. The Joint Declaration promised Hong Kong's status as a Special Administrative Region (SAR) of China after 1997, and allowed Hong Kong citizens to retain their rights and freedoms enjoyed under British rule.

== Personality ==
Zhou was described by Mark Roberti of Asiaweek as “witty and urbane and liked to charm people by quoting classical Chinese poems. Although he wore old-fashioned glasses and drab Chinese-made suits, he spoke fluent English and was regarded as a sophisticated international diplomat. At the negotiating table, Zhou was tough, aggressive, even brutish. He was a ferocious negotiator who carried out instructions ruthlessly."

"Intelligent, cultivated, a great man for quotations, whether in Chinese or English, a great man for toasts in maotai, [Zhou Nan] had acquired some of the Western habits of transacting business: it was even possible to get authoritative answers out of him by telephone; and he accelerated the delicate manoeuvres on the agenda for the talks." - Sir Percy Cradock, British Ambassador to China (1978–1984)
