= List of ambassadors of the United Kingdom to Nepal =

The ambassador of the United Kingdom to Nepal is the United Kingdom's chief diplomatic representative in Nepal, and head of the UK's diplomatic mission.

The present official title is His Britannic Majesty's Ambassador to the Federal Democratic Republic of Nepal.

== List of heads of mission ==
=== Envoys ===
- 1924–1929: Hugh Wilkinson
- 1929–1934: Clendon Daukes

=== Envoys extraordinary and ministers plenipotentiary ===
- 1934–1935: Clendon Daukes
- 1935–1938: Frederick Bailey
- 1938–1944: Sir Geoffrey Betham
- 1944–1947: Sir George Falconer

=== Ambassadors ===
- 1947–1951: Sir George Falconer
- 1951–1955: Christopher Summerhayes
- 1955–1957: Richard Tollinton
- 1957–1962: Sir Leonard Scopes
- 1962–1963: Guy Clarke
- 1964–1965: Antony Duff
- 1966–1970: Arthur Kellas
- 1970–1974: Terence O'Brien MC CMG
- 1974–1977: Michael Scott
- 1977–1983: John Denson
- 1983–1986: Sir Anthony Hurrell
- 1987–1990: Richard Burges Watson
- 1990–1995: Timothy George
- 1995–1999: Barney Smith
- 1999–2002: Ronald Nash
- 2002–2006: Keith Bloomfield
- 2006–2010: Andrew Hall
- 2010–2013: John Tucknott
- 2013–2015: Andrew Sparkes
- 2015: John Rankin
- 2015–2019: Richard Morris
- 2019–2023: Nicola Pollitt
- 2023–present: Robert Fenn

== See also ==
- List of British Resident Ministers in Nepal
- Nepal–Britain Treaty of 1923
