= Sino-British Joint Declaration =

1984 treaty on the transfer of Hong Kong

Sino-British Joint Declaration 中英联合声明
Joint Declaration of the Government of the United Kingdom of Great Britain and Northern Ireland and the Government of the People's Republic of China on the Question of Hong Kong (Note: For the official name of the declaration, the English-language document has the Government of the United Kingdom of Great Britain and Northern Ireland named first, whilst the Chinese-language document has the Government of the People's Republic of China named first.)
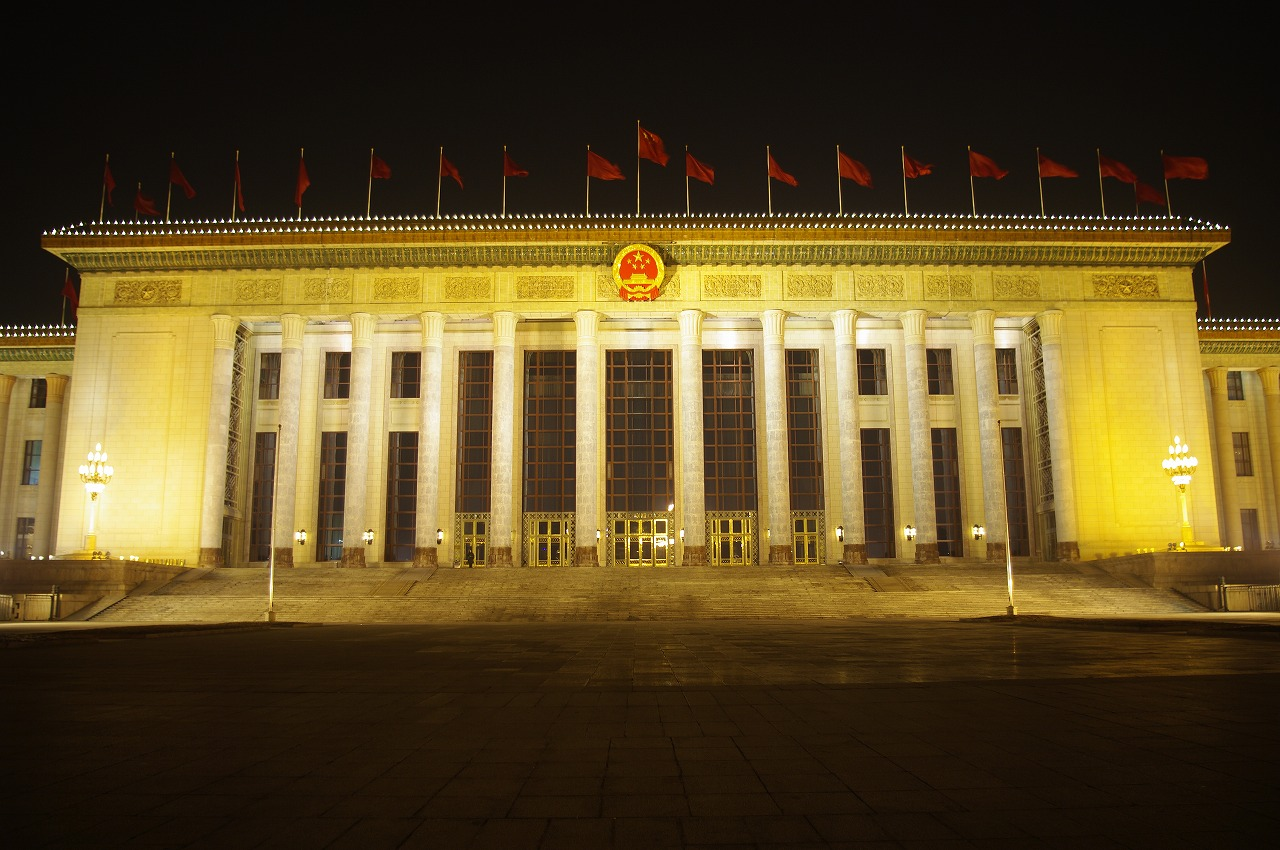
- The Great Hall of the People, where the Joint Declaration was signed
- Context: Agreement on the future of Hong Kong
- Drafted: June 1984 to September 1984; 42 years ago
- Signed: 19 December 1984; 41 years ago
- Location: Great Hall of the People, Beijing, China
- Effective: 27 July 1985; 41 years ago
- Condition: Exchange of ratifications
- Expiry: (See dispute over treaty status)
- Negotiators: British delegation led by Percy Cradock and Richard Evans, Chinese delegation led by Yao Guang and Zhou Nan
- Signatories: Margaret Thatcher, Prime Minister of the United Kingdom; Zhao Ziyang, Premier of China
- Parties: United Kingdom; China
- Languages: English; Chinese

Full text
- Sino-British Joint Declaration at Wikisource

Sino–British Joint Declaration
- Traditional Chinese: 中英聯合聲明
- Simplified Chinese: 中英联合声明
Transcriptions
Standard Mandarin
- Hanyu Pinyin: Zhōng-Yīng Liánhé Shēngmíng
- Wade–Giles: Chung^{1}-Ying^{1} Lien^{2}-ho^{2} Sheng^{1}-ming^{2}
Hakka
- Romanization: Zung^{1}-Yin^{1} Lien^{2}hap^{6} Sang^{1}min^{2}
Yue: Cantonese
- Yale Romanization: Jūng-yīng lyùhnhahp singmìhng
- Jyutping: Zung^{1}-Jing^{1} Lyun^{4}hap^{6} Sing^{1}ming^{4}
- IPA: [tsʊ́ŋjɪ́ŋ ly̏ːnhɐ̀p ɕɪ́ŋmɪ̏ŋ]

Joint Declaration of the Government of the United Kingdom of Great Britain and Northern Ireland and the Government of the People's Republic of China on the Question of Hong Kong
- Traditional Chinese: 中華人民共和國政府和大不列顛及北愛爾蘭聯合王國政府關於香港問題的聯合聲明
- Simplified Chinese: 中华人民共和国政府和大不列颠及北爱尔兰联合王国政府关于香港问题的联合声明
Transcriptions
Standard Mandarin
- Hanyu Pinyin: Zhōnghuá Rénmín Gònghéguó zhèngfŭ hé Dà Búlièdiàn jí Běi Ài'ěrlán Liánhé Wángguó zhèngfŭ guānyú Xiānggǎng Wèntí de Liánhé Shēngmíng
Hakka
- Romanization: Zung^{1}fa^{2} Ngin^{2}min^{2} Kiung^{4}fo^{2}get^{5}(or gok^{5}) zin^{4}fu^{3} fo^{2} Tai^{4} But^{5}liet^{6}dien^{1} kip^{6} Bet^{5} Oi^{4}li^{3}(or ni^{3})lan^{2} Lien^{2}hap^{6} Vong^{2}get^{5}(or gok^{5}) zin^{4}fu^{3} gan^{1}yi^{1} Hiong^{1}gong^{3} Mun^{4}ti^{2} dit^{5}(or e^{4}) Lien^{2}hap^{6} Sang^{1}min^{2}
Yue: Cantonese
- Yale Romanization: Jūngwàah Jàhnmàhn Guhngwòhgwok jing fú wòh daaih bāk liht dīn kahp bāk oi yíh làahn lyùhn hahp wòhng gwok jing fú gwāan yū heùng góng mahn taìh dīk lyùhn hahp sīng mìhng
- Jyutping: Zung^{1}waa^{4} Jan^{4}man^{4} Gung^{6}wo^{4}gwok^{3} zing^{3}fu^{2} wo^{4} Daai^{6} Bak^{1}lit^{6}din^{1} kap^{6} Bak^{1} Oi^{3}ji^{5}laan^{4} Lyun^{4}hap^{6} Wong^{4}gwok^{3} zing^{3}fu^{2} gwaan^{1}jyu^{1} Hoeng^{1}gong^{2} Man^{6}tai^{4} dik^{1} Lyun^{4}hap^{6} Sing^{1}ming^{4}

The Sino-British Joint Declaration was a treaty signed in 1984 between the governments of China and the United Kingdom which set the conditions in which Hong Kong was transferred to Chinese control and for the governance of the territory after 1 July 1997.

Hong Kong had been a colony of the British Empire since 1842 and its territory was expanded on two occasions; first in 1860 with the addition of Kowloon Peninsula and Stonecutters Island, as both were ceded in perpetuity, and again in 1898 when Britain obtained a 99-year lease for the New Territories. The date of the handover in 1997 marked the end of this lease.

The Chinese government declared in the treaty its basic policies for governing Hong Kong after the transfer. A special administrative region would be established in the territory that would be self-governing with a high degree of autonomy, except in foreign affairs and defence. Hong Kong would maintain its existing governing and economic systems separate from that of mainland China under the principle of "one country, two systems". This blueprint would be elaborated on in the Hong Kong Basic Law (the post-handover regional constitution) and the central government's policies for the territory were to remain unchanged for a period of 50 years after 1997.

China has stated since 2014 that it considers the treaty to be spent with no further legal effect, while the United Kingdom maintains that the document remains binding in operation. Following China's 2020 imposition of national security legislation on Hong Kong and a 2021 National People's Congress decision to approve a rework of local election laws that reduces the number of regional legislature seats elected by the public, the UK has declared China as being in a "state of ongoing non-compliance" with the Joint Declaration.

Since 2017, China deemed the document expired and invalid as of 30 June 1997, while the UK continues to assert that it remains effective.

== Background ==
=== Phases of colonial expansion ===
Britain acquired Hong Kong Island in 1842, Kowloon Peninsula in 1860, and leased the New Territories in 1898 for 99 years.

Hong Kong became a British colony in 1842 after the British defeated the Qing dynasty in the First Opium War. The territory initially consisted only of Hong Kong Island and was expanded to include Kowloon Peninsula and Stonecutters Island in 1860 after another Qing loss in the Second Opium War.

After this addition, the British government resisted calls by colonial officials and merchants for further expansion into China, deciding to cease territorial acquisitions in the area. However, as Germany, Japan, and Russia coerced China into granting concessions in the late 1890s, Britain considered another expansion of Hong Kong to bolster the colony's defence against attack from these other great powers. When France obtained a lease for Guangzhouwan, only 210 miles (340 km) away from Hong Kong, Britain entered into negotiations with the Qing to acquire the New Territories as a compensatory concession in 1898. The British negotiator considered the 99-year lease term to be sufficiently suggestive that the ceded area would be a permanent cession, which was granted rent-free.

=== Potential lease renegotiations ===
Hong Kong Governor Frederick Lugard first proposed renegotiating the lease as a formal cession in 1909 in return for restoring Weihaiwei to China. Although the Colonial and Foreign Offices considered this, the plan was never brought to the Chinese government before Weihaiwei was transferred to the Republic of China in 1930. Alternate plans that involved offering China a substantial loan and settling land disputes on the Burmese border were suggested, but these ideas similarly did not progress past discussion. The start of the Second World War and ensuing Japanese occupation of Hong Kong stifled further debate on obtaining a cession. The British government initially prepared for the possibility of having to relinquish Hong Kong after the war, but moved towards retaining the colony over the course of the conflict. Hong Kong returned to British control in 1945.

In the immediate post-war period, the Nationalist government continued this dialogue with the British about the future of Hong Kong, which included discussions of a full retrocession and proposals of turning the colony into an international city. However, communist victory in the Chinese Civil War made a transfer of Hong Kong to the Nationalists an increasingly unlikely scenario, and the status quo was maintained.

=== Coexistence with the People's Republic ===
Although communist troops marched up to the border with Hong Kong, they did not try to forcefully take the colony. Initial engagement between the colonial and new Chinese authorities were largely friendly and cooperative. While it was clear that the long-term goal of the communists was to absorb the territory, they chose to take no action on the issue in the near-term. The Chinese were content with the political status of the colony for the time being so long as no efforts were made to introduce democratic development in the territory; they were simply hostile to the idea of a potentially independent Hong Kong. In 1972, China successfully petitioned the United Nations to remove Hong Kong from its list of non-self-governing territories, and declared that the colony was a "Chinese territory under British administration". The United Kingdom did not raise any objections to this and the local population did not think the move was significant, but the implication of this change was that Communist China alone would determine the territory's future, excluding the people of Hong Kong.

Post-war Hong Kong experienced rapid economic growth through the 1950s as it industrialised into a manufacturing-based export economy. This development continued through the following decades bolstered by a strong trading network, robust banking and financial systems, and an educated and growing workforce supplemented by continuing immigration from mainland China. As the Cultural Revolution embroiled mainland China beginning in 1966, local communists in Hong Kong started a series of demonstrations against colonial rule that escalated into the 1967 Hong Kong riots. However, the disturbances never gained local support and the subsequent restoration of public order conversely resulted in the colonial government achieving increased popularity among the territory's residents. By the late 1970s, Hong Kong had become one of the largest trading ports and financial centres in the world.

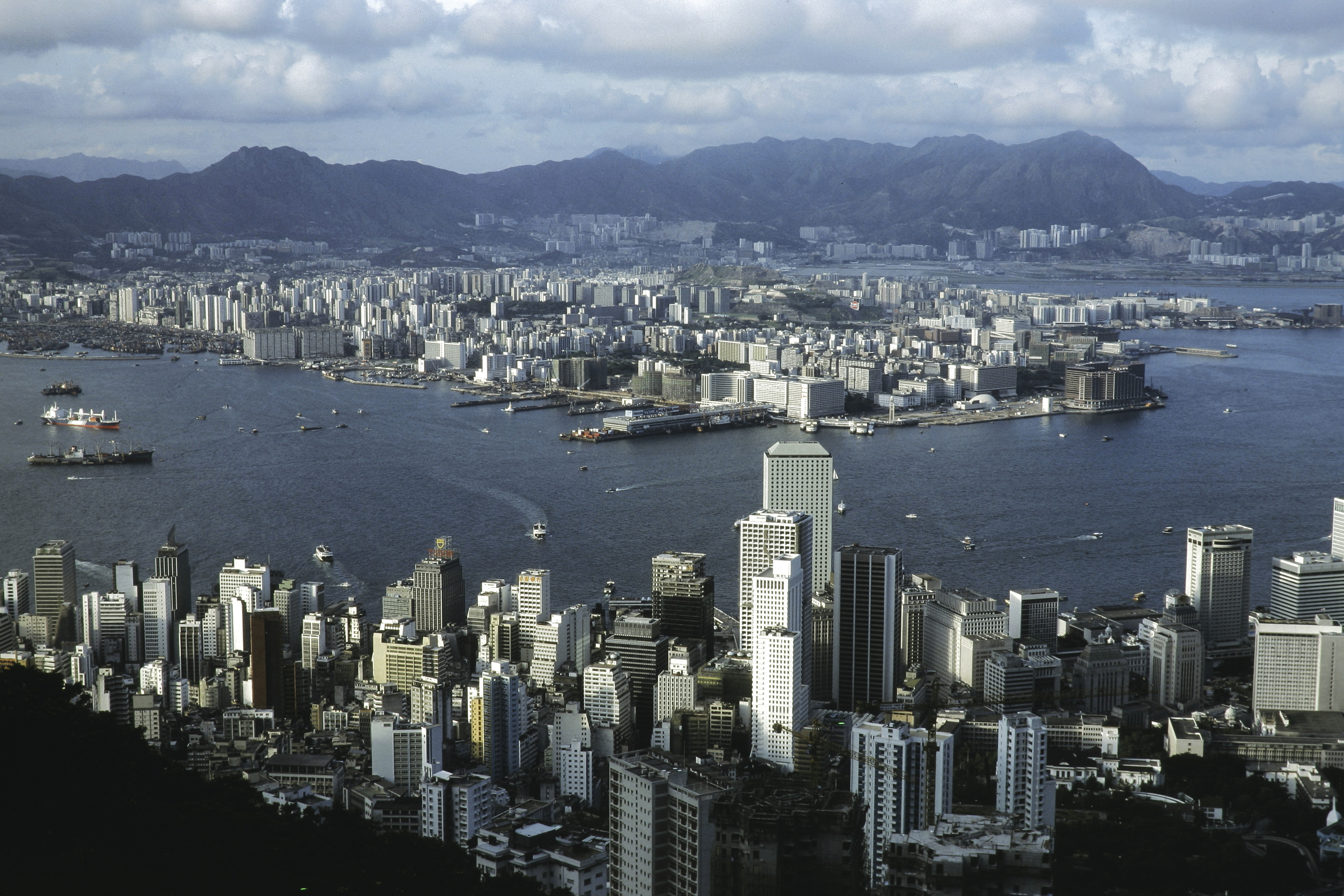
Urban Hong Kong in 1980

=== Approaching deadline ===
Local investors began expressing their concern in the mid-1970s over the long-term viability of continued real estate investment. The colonial government could not legally grant new land leases in the New Territories past 1997 and needed to resolve the uncertainty with the Chinese government. During an official visit to Beijing in March 1979, Governor Murray MacLehose raised the issue with Vice Premier Deng Xiaoping. MacLehose suggested setting aside the 1997 date for land leases and replacing those contracts with ones that were valid for as long as British administration continued in the colony. Deng rejected this suggestion, but he informed the governor that while sovereignty over Hong Kong belonged to China, the territory held a special status that would continue to be respected. MacLehose informed the public that further investment would be safe. Market reaction was optimistic; stock valuations rose and further investment in real estate boosted the value of Hong Kong's land to the highest in the world.

Just before the start of formal negotiations with China over Hong Kong, Parliament enacted a major reform of British nationality law – the British Nationality Act 1981. Prior to the passage of this Act, all citizens of the British Empire (including Hongkongers) held a common nationality. Citizens of the United Kingdom and Colonies (CUKCs) previously had the unrestricted right to enter and live in the UK until 1962, although non-white immigration was systemically discouraged. Immigration from the colonies and other Commonwealth countries was gradually restricted by Parliament from 1962 to 1971 amid decolonisation, when British subjects originating from outside of the British Islands first had immigration controls imposed on them when entering the UK. The 1981 Act reclassified CUKCs into different nationality groups based on their ancestry and birthplace, and the vast majority of British subjects in Hong Kong became British Dependent Territories citizens (BDTCs) with right of abode only in Hong Kong. Only those reclassified as British citizens held an automatic right to live in the United Kingdom.

== Negotiations ==
Formal negotiations began in September 1982 with the arrival of British Prime Minister Margaret Thatcher and Hong Kong Governor Edward Youde in Beijing to meet with Chinese Premier Zhao Ziyang and paramount leader Deng Xiaoping. In the initial phase of negotiations from October 1982 to June 1983, the main point of contention was the issue of sovereignty.

The goals of the Chinese government were made clear from the beginning of the process. China would resume both sovereignty and administration over Hong Kong in 1997. It would do this by force if necessary, but preferred to keep the territory's socioeconomic climate stable to maximize the economic benefits it could reap from the transfer. Its proposed plan was to establish a special administrative region in the territory that would be governed by local residents and to maintain the existing structures of government and economy in place for as long as 50 years. Constitutional arrangements had already been made to implement this plan and the Chinese would not accept anything less than a full reversion of Hong Kong.

=== Sovereignty after 1997 ===
During her first visit to Beijing, Thatcher asserted the continuing validity of British treaty rights for the sovereignty of Hong Kong. The British began negotiations believing that they could secure an extension of the New Territories lease while retaining sovereignty of the ceded areas. Although the UK had just successfully defended its hold on the Falkland Islands in a war against Argentina, Hong Kong's proximity to mainland China made a military defence of the territory impossible. Thatcher later recounted that Deng had told her directly "I could walk in and take the whole lot this afternoon", to which she replied, "There is nothing I could do to stop you, but the eyes of the world would now know what China is like."

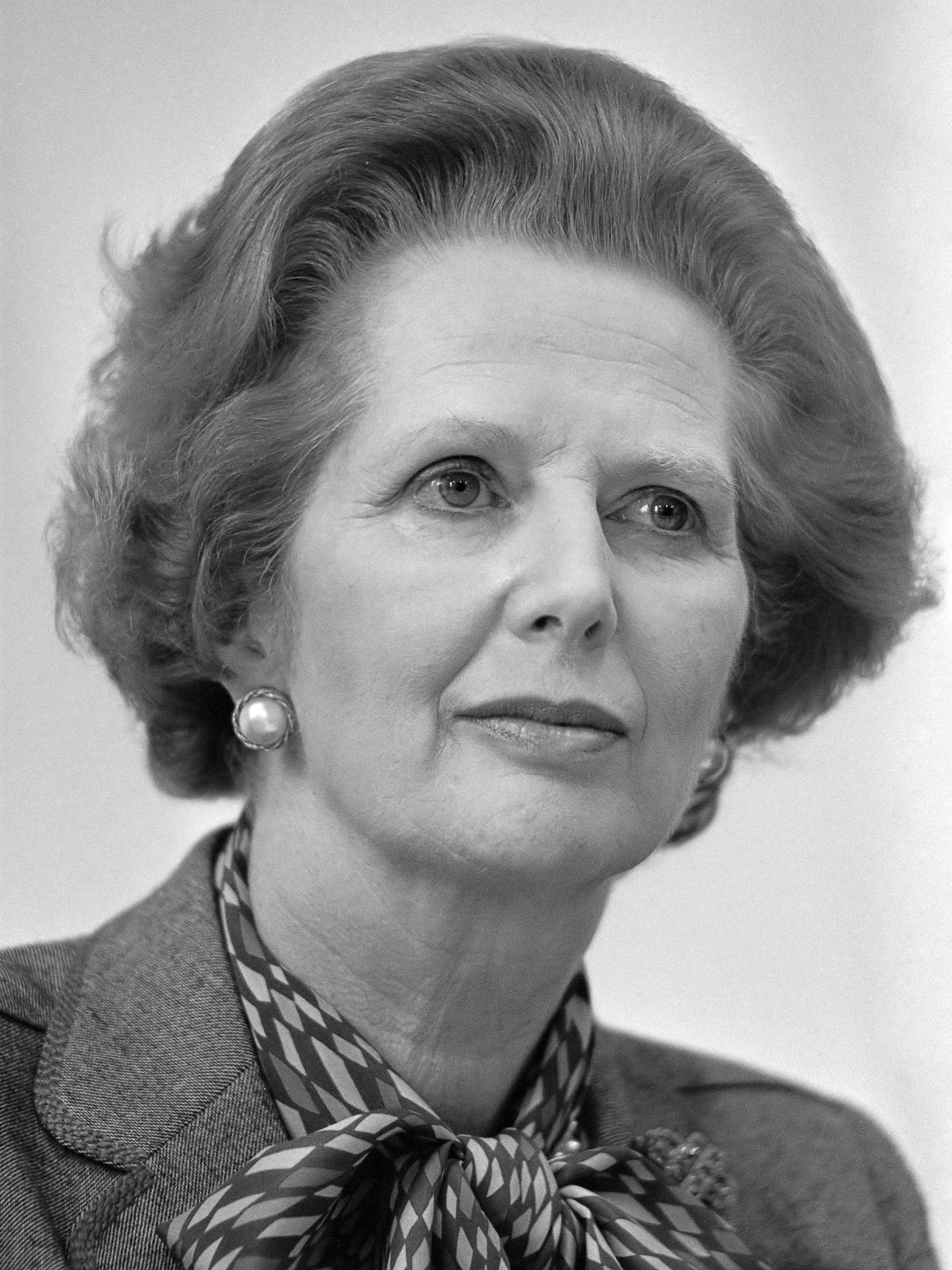
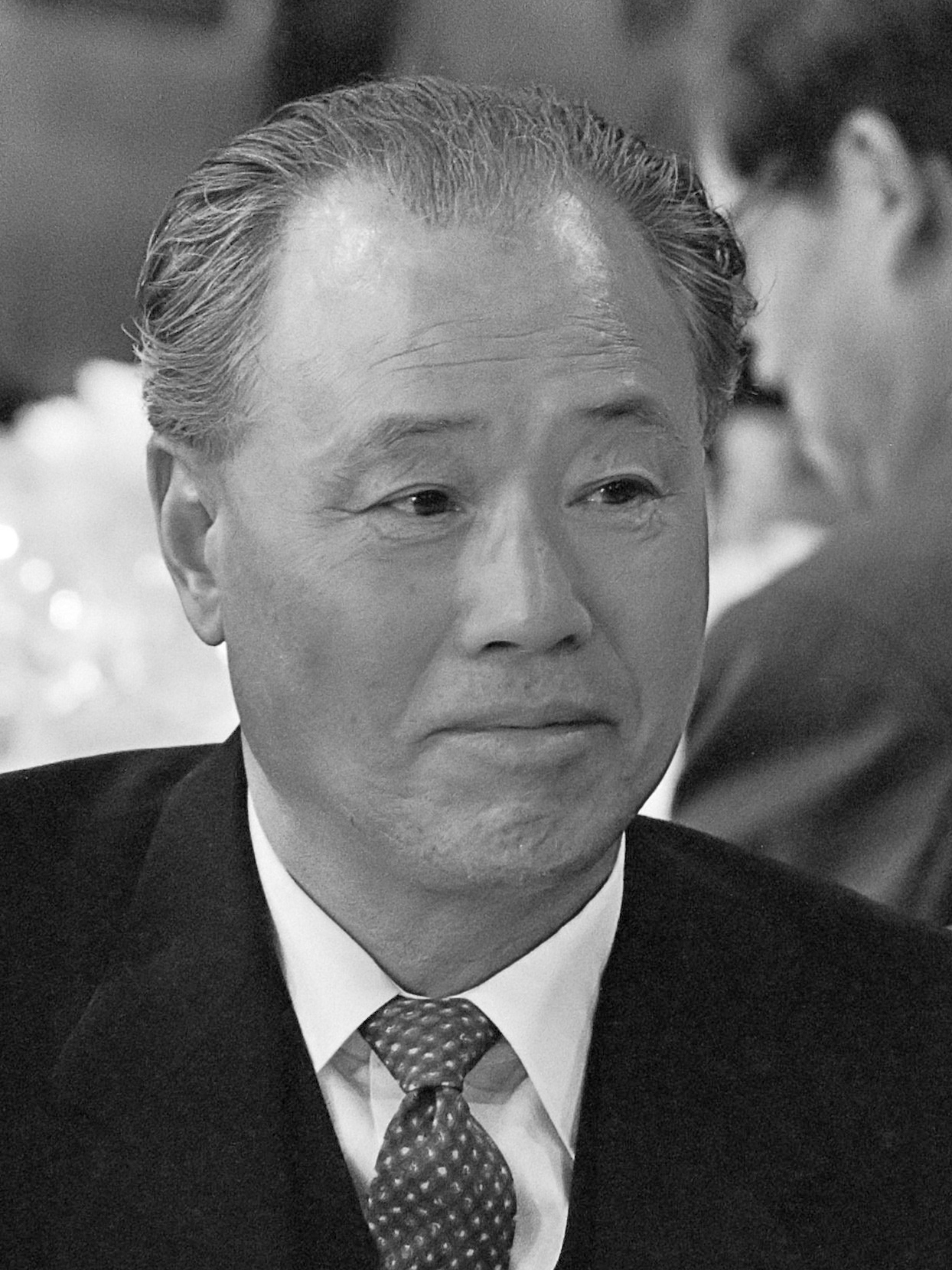
British Prime Minister Margaret Thatcher and Chinese Premier Zhao Ziyang, signatories to the Joint Declaration

The Chinese pushed back against the assertion of sovereignty rights and insisted that it was not bound by the 19th-century unequal treaties that ceded Hong Kong to the UK. Even if the two sides had agreed on the binding nature of the Treaty of Nanking and Convention of Peking, the vast majority of the colony's land still would have reverted to China at the conclusion of the New Territories lease. Because most of the territory's industry was developed there, separating the leased area and returning only that part of the colony to China was economically and logistically infeasible. Negotiations were stalled until Britain conceded that it would relinquish sovereignty over the entire territory. Thatcher later pointed out in 1997 that if Britain had tried to retain Hong Kong Island, the Chinese did not have to militarily invade as they could have simply just turned off the supply of water in order to make British retention of the territory unviable.

=== British attempt to extend administration ===
In the second phase of negotiations, the British attempted to negotiate an extension of their administration in Hong Kong past 1997 in exchange for their acknowledgement of Chinese sovereignty. This was again soundly rejected by the Chinese as unacceptable. The continued stalled state of negotiations precipitated a drop in investor confidence, causing a sharp decline in local property values that culminated with the crash of the Hong Kong dollar's value on Black Saturday in September 1983.

The talks were entirely conducted without meaningful input from the people of Hong Kong. Early in the process, British officials had used the analogy of a "three-legged stool" to describe a scenario where Hong Kong was party to the negotiations with the United Kingdom and China. The Chinese government dismissed this idea, claiming that it already represented the interests of the people of Hong Kong. Local residents were apprehensive about the prospect of being handed over to Chinese rule and overwhelmingly preferred that Hong Kong remain a British territory; contemporary opinion polls show that 85 per cent of residents favoured this option. The Foreign Office rejected holding a general referendum on the future of the colony due to vehement opposition from the Chinese and because it assumed that educating the public on the complexity of the issue would be too difficult. Although the Unofficial Members of the Executive and Legislative Councils had repeatedly petitioned the British negotiators to insist on continued administration for as long as possible, they were ultimately unsuccessful. By November 1983, the British accepted that they would have no further authority over Hong Kong after 1997.

=== Nationality and the Joint Liaison Group ===
Negotiations in 1984 centred on nationality and the role of the Joint Liaison Group. British negotiators and Hong Kong Executive Council members wanted to ensure the continued status of Hongkongers as British Dependent Territories citizens (BDTCs) after the transfer of sovereignty, but the Chinese would not allow this and even demanded that further granting of BDTC status be halted immediately. Although there were debates in the British Parliament on granting all residents British Overseas citizenship that could be transferred to children for up to two generations after 1997, this was not implemented and the Joint Declaration instead provided for a new status to be created. The Chinese initially wanted the Joint Liaison Group to act as an oversight committee during the transition period of administering Hong Kong up to the handover date. At the insistence of Governor Youde and Executive Council members, the group was limited in its scope to be strictly advisory.

A bilateral working group was created in June 1984 to draft the text of the treaty and its annexes. This was completed in three months, and on 26 September 1984, a draft copy of the Joint Declaration was initialed by British Ambassador to China Richard Evans and Chinese Vice Foreign Minister Zhou Nan. The final version was signed on 19 December 1984 by Prime Minister Thatcher and Premier Zhao in the Great Hall of the People in Beijing; the treaty came into force when instruments of ratification were exchanged on 27 May 1985 and was registered at the United Nations by both governments on 12 June 1985.

== Content ==
The Joint Declaration consists of its main text, Annex I elaborating the Chinese government's basic policies for Hong Kong, Annex II concerning plans for the Sino–British Joint Liaison Group, Annex III explaining protections for land leases granted by the colonial government, and two memoranda from each party describing transitional nationality arrangements for local residents.

=== Main text ===
In the main text of the treaty, the Chinese government declared its intention to resume the exercise of its sovereignty over the entire area of Hong Kong (including the ceded areas of Hong Kong Island and Kowloon Peninsula, as well as the leased New Territories) on 1 July 1997 and the British government agreed to transfer control of the territory on that date. China stated its basic policies for administering the returned area; it would establish a special administrative region that would be autonomous in governing local affairs. The economic, social, governing, and legal systems would remain basically unchanged from as they existed under colonial administration. Hong Kong would remain a separate customs territory with free flow of capital. Civil and property rights would remain protected after the transfer of sovereignty. During the transition period from the date the treaty came into force until 30 June 1997, the United Kingdom would continue to be responsible for administering Hong Kong with the objective of maintaining its economic prosperity and social stability.

=== Annex I: Chinese basic policies for Hong Kong ===
The first annex of the treaty elaborates on the Chinese government's basic policies for Hong Kong. There are 14 policies listed in Annex I, providing a framework under which the post-handover government would be established. This part of the Joint Declaration provides for economic and administrative continuity through the transfer of sovereignty. Executive, legislative, and judicial powers would be devolved by the central government to the special administrative region, which is given a "high degree of autonomy" in exercising those powers in all areas except for defence and diplomatic affairs. The region retains the ability to maintain separate economic and cultural relations with foreign nations. Socialism as practised in mainland China would not be extended to Hong Kong and the territory's capitalist economy and the civil liberties of its residents (such as freedom of speech, assembly, and religion) would be protected and remain unchanged for 50 years.

The territory would be allowed to maintain its separate financial markets; the Hong Kong dollar remains the regional currency. In the areas of civil aviation and maritime shipping, Hong Kong would continue as a separate entity from the mainland. Education and the maintenance of public order would be the regional government's responsibility. Right of abode in Hong Kong and immigration matters remain separate from mainland China, and the region could issue its own passports. All of these policies would be further detailed in the Hong Kong Basic Law, which would stipulate the framework in which the new special administrative region would function.

=== Annex II: Sino-British Joint Liaison Group ===
The second annex of the treaty provided for the establishment of the Sino-British Joint Liaison Group, consisting of diplomats from both governments, to facilitate ongoing dialogue for the implementation of the Joint Declaration and a smooth transfer of government. This group was strictly intended to be a channel of close communication for both parties and did not have authority to supervise or participate in the administration of the territory. The Joint Liaison Group was given two specific objectives during the period between its establishment and the transfer of sovereignty. In the first half of this period, it would consider actions necessary to maintain Hong Kong's status as a separate customs territory and ensure continuity of its international rights and obligations. During the second half leading up to the handover, the Liaison Group would consider actions needed to ensure a successful transition in 1997 and assist the incoming regional government in developing relations and agreements with other countries and international organisations for economic and cultural purposes. The mandate for this group ended on 1 January 2000.

=== Annex III: Land leases ===
The third annex of the treaty dealt with the validity of land leases granted by the colonial Hong Kong government. All existing land lease contracts continue to be recognised by the post-handover SAR government. All leases without options of renewal that expired before 30 June 1997 could be extended for periods lasting no later than 30 June 2047. New leases granted by the colonial government after the treaty came into force could last no longer than the 2047 date and were subject to a 50-hectare annual aggregate limit on the total amount of land the government could contract out for purposes other than for housing. A Land Commission consisting of an equal number of representatives from the British and Chinese governments was established to oversee the implementation of this annex until the transfer of sovereignty in 1997.

=== Memoranda on nationality ===
The memoranda attached to the end of the treaty contains transitional nationality arrangements for local residents, which included a stipulation that a new nationality would be created for Hongkongers that did not confer right of abode in the United Kingdom. The Hong Kong Act 1985 created the British National (Overseas) status to fulfil this requirement. All British Dependent Territories citizens (BDTCs) connected with Hong Kong who did not have a connection with a remaining British Dependent Territory would lose that status on the day of the transfer in 1997. Ethnic Chinese Hongkongers became Chinese nationals and could only retain British nationality if they had registered as BN(O)s before the handover. Although they were permitted to use British passports for international travel after the transfer, ethnic Chinese BN(O)s were explicitly restricted from accessing British consular protection within the Hong Kong SAR or any other part of Chinese territory. Residents who were not ethnically Chinese, had not registered as BN(O)s, and would have been stateless on that date automatically became British Overseas citizens.

== Post-agreement ==
=== Contemporary reactions ===
The signing of the Joint Declaration caused some controversy in the United Kingdom because UK's Conservative Party Prime Minister Margaret Thatcher was agreeing with China's Communist government represented by Deng Xiaoping. In the White Paper that contained the Joint Declaration, it was declared by Her Majesty's Government that "the alternative to acceptance of the present agreement is to have no agreement", a statement meant as a rebuttal to criticisms that the declaration had made too many concessions to China, and hinting at China's significant leverage during the negotiations.

Some political analysts thought that there was an urgency to make an agreement because there were fears that without a treaty the economy in Hong Kong would collapse in the 1980s. Concerns about land ownership in the leased New Territories also added to the problem. Although discussions on the future of Hong Kong had started in the late 1970s, the final timing of the Joint Declaration was more affected by property and economic factors rather than geopolitical necessities.

=== Initial period after 1997 transfer ===
In the immediate years following the transfer of sovereignty, Chinese oversight of Hong Kong was considered relatively benign and hands-off. Although the Chinese had reversed the last British democratic reforms for Legislative Council elections, general governance of the region was otherwise virtually unchanged. While most organisations with royal patronage dropped this association prior to the handover, there was no strict requirement for renaming; the Royal Hong Kong Yacht Club and Royal Asiatic Society Hong Kong Branch maintain the "Royal" prefix in their names. Colonial-era street names and postbox royal cyphers are not actively removed by the government and remain unchanged.

After the Asian financial crisis in 1997 the Hong Kong measures were taken with the full co-operation of the Central Chinese government. This did not mean that the Chinese government dictated what to do and therefore still followed the points of the declaration.

Despite this autonomy, the government of the Hong Kong Special Administrative Region sometimes sought interference from the Central Chinese government. For example, in 1999 the government of the HKSAR asked China's State Council to seek an interpretation by the National People's Congress Standing Committee on a provision in the Basic Law. The original decision reached by the Hong Kong Court of Final Appeal was seen as problematic by the HKSAR government as it would have allowed up to 1.6 million mainland immigrants to enter Hong Kong. The Chinese authorities obliged and the Hong Kong court's judgment was overturned, stopping the potential immigration.

Pressures from the mainland government were also apparent, for example in 2000, after the election of pro-independence candidate Chen Shui-bian as Taiwan's president, a senior mainland official in Hong Kong warned journalists not to report the news. Another senior official advised businessmen not to do business with pro-independence Taiwanese.

With this and other changes, ten years after the return, in 2007, The Guardian wrote that on the one hand, "nothing has changed since the handover to China 10 years ago", but this was in comparison to the situation before the last governor Chris Patten had introduced democratic reforms three years before the handover. A chance for democracy had been lost as Hong Kong had just begun to develop three vital elements for a western-style democracy (the rule of law, official accountability and a political class outside the one-party system) but the Sino–British deal had prevented any of these changes to continue according to Jonathan Fenby of The Guardian.

Wu Bangguo, the chairman of the National People's Congress Standing Committee stated in a conference in Beijing 2007, that "Hong Kong had considerable autonomy only because the central government had chosen to authorize that autonomy".

=== Dispute over treaty status ===
The Chinese and Hong Kong governments have stated since 2014 that they consider the Joint Declaration to have ceased any legal effect after the transfer of sovereignty, and that the central government's basic policies as elaborated in the document were a unilateral statement not actually binding. These statements are directly contradicted by the 50-year period of unchanged policies in Hong Kong that the central government committed to as part of the Joint Declaration. Chinese government reiterated in 2017 that the Joint Declaration was a "historical document" that no longer had any practical significance. Former LegCo president and Standing Committee member Rita Fan has asserted that United Kingdom supervisory responsibility over the Joint Declaration's implementation lapsed when the Sino-British Joint Liaison Group disbanded in 2000.

The United Kingdom, United States, and G7 maintain that the Joint Declaration remains valid and in force. The Foreign Office has labelled the Causeway Bay Books disappearances in 2015, enactment of the Hong Kong national security law in 2020, disqualification of opposition Legislative Council candidates in 2020, and electoral reform in 2021 as serious breaches of the treaty. Since 2021, the UK has considered China to be in a "state of ongoing non-compliance" with the Joint Declaration.

China disregards accusations of Joint Declaration breaches as foreign interference and neocolonialist tampering, and considers Hong Kong matters to be part of its internal affairs. Chinese foreign ministry spokespersons have repeatedly stated that the United Kingdom lacks supervisory authority over Hong Kong following the handover in 1997 and that the treaty is a historical document with no extant binding authority. The central government's primary regional agency, the Hong Kong Liaison Office, declared in April 2020 that it was exempt from Basic Law restrictions on mainland government interference in local affairs.

Following China's imposition of national security legislation on Hong Kong in 2020, the UK extended residence rights and created a new path to citizenship for Hong Kong residents with British National (Overseas) status. The Chinese government derided this change as "gross interference" and subsequently withdrew recognition of BN(O) passports as valid travel documents in 2021. The United States enacted the Hong Kong Autonomy Act in response to the national security law, and imposed economic sanctions on 34 individuals that the US State and Treasury Departments determined to have materially contributed to Joint Declaration breaches. The list of sanctioned persons includes Chief Executive Carrie Lam, principal officials of the Hong Kong government, and members of the Standing Committee of the National People's Congress.

In March 2024 the pro-Beijing legislature in Hong Kong fast-tracked a new security law under Article 23 of the Hong Kong Basic Law, which introduced harsh new penalties such as life imprisonment for new offences such as external interference and insurrection. Critics claimed that the law would further erode civil liberties enshrined in the Joint Declaration.

== See also ==
- Sino-Portuguese Joint Declaration
