= Leonard Appleyard =

British diplomat (1938–2020)

Sir Leonard Appleyard KCMG

British Ambassador to China
- In office 1994–1997
- Monarch: Elizabeth II
- President: Jiang Zemin
- Prime Minister: John Major
- Preceded by: Sir Robin McLaren
- Succeeded by: Sir Anthony Galsworthy

Personal details
- Born: 2 September 1938
- Died: 7 February 2020 (aged 81)
- Spouses: Elizabeth West (m. 1964–1994) Joan Jefferson (m. 1994–2020)
- Education: Read School, Drax
- Alma mater: Queens' College, Cambridge
- Occupation: Diplomat

Sir Leonard Vincent Appleyard, KCMG (2 September 1938 – 7 February 2020) was a British diplomat.

== Education ==
Born in 1938, Appleyard was educated at The Read School, an independent school for boys (now co-educational) in the village of Drax in North Yorkshire, followed by Queens' College, Cambridge, from which he gained a degree (with Honours) in Classical Chinese. He spoke Mandarin, Russian, Hungarian and French.

== Career ==
Appleyard served at the British Embassy in the People's Republic of China between 1966 and 1968 (during the country's Cultural Revolution). He served as First Secretary in the British High Commission in India from 1971 to 1974, and later returned to China as ambassador in 1994 until 1997, a period which witnessed the Taiwan Strait Crisis (1995–96) and also the 'handover' of Hong Kong from UK rule to the People's Republic of China.

Appleyard also served as the UK's ambassador to Hungary, in the Treasury, in the Cabinet Office as Deputy Cabinet Secretary, as Secretary of the Gulf War Cabinet, and as Financial Counsellor in Paris.

Following his departure from the diplomatic service, Appleyard took up a position as vice-chairman of Barclays Capital.

Appleyard also served as joint-Chairman on the Nuffield Languages Programme Steering Group along with Sir Trevor McDonald.

He was Pro-Chancellor of Bournemouth University.

He died on 7 February 2020 at the age of 81.

Diplomatic posts
Preceded by Sir Brian Fall	Principal Private Secretary to the Foreign Secretary; 1984–1986	Succeeded by Sir Anthony Galsworthy
Preceded by Peter Unwin	British Ambassador to Hungary; 1986–1989	Succeeded by Sir John Birch
Preceded by Sir John Weston	Director, Political of the Foreign and Commonwealth Office; 1991–1994	Succeeded by Pauline, The Baroness Neville-Jones
Preceded by Sir Robin McLaren	British Ambassador to China; 1994–1997	Succeeded by Sir Anthony Galsworthy
