= Richard Evans (British diplomat) =

British diplomat

Sir Richard Evans KCMG KCVO
- 伊文思爵士

British Ambassador to the People's Republic of China
- In office January 1984 – May 1988
- Monarch: Elizabeth II
- Preceded by: Sir Percy Cradock
- Succeeded by: Sir Alan Donald

Personal details
- Born: 15 April 1928 British Honduras
- Died: 24 August 2012 (aged 84) Wiltshire, England
- Education: Magdalen College, Oxford; Repton School, Derbyshire

Sir Richard Mark Evans KCMG KCVO (Chinese: 伊文思爵士; 15 April 1928 – 24 August 2012) was a British diplomat who was the ambassador to the People's Republic of China from January 1984 to May 1988, during which he and Zhou Nan, the Chinese representative, initialled the Sino-British Joint Declaration on 26 September 1984.

== Education ==
Evans was educated at Repton School, a boarding independent school for boys in the village of Repton in Derbyshire, followed by Magdalen College, Oxford.

== Life and career ==
Evans joined the Foreign Office in 1952. Before becoming ambassador to China, he was stationed in the British charge d'affaires office in Peking twice, from 1955 to 1957 and from 1962 to 1964. During his ambassadorship, he also acted as the chief representative of the British delegation from the eighth to the twenty-second round of Sino-British negotiations over the sovereignty issue of Hong Kong.

In fact, much of the core negotiations had been done by his predecessor Sir Percy Cradock and therefore, the major mission of Evans and his team was to draft the clauses of the Joint Declaration with their Chinese counterparts within the limited time frame. The series of negotiations ultimately resulted in the formal signing of the Joint Declaration by the British Prime Minister Margaret Thatcher and the Chinese Premier Zhao Ziyang in Peking on 19 December 1984, a treaty confirming the transfer of sovereignty of Hong Kong from the United Kingdom to China in 1997.

Evans later participated in arranging a number of high-ranking official visits between the two nations. One of them was the historic visit of Queen Elizabeth II to China in October 1986. In retirement, he wrote a biography of Chinese national leader Deng Xiaoping. It was published in 1993 and was translated into Japanese, Chinese, Thai, Hungarian, and other languages.

== Honours ==
- Order of St Michael and St George, 1983

Diplomatic posts
Preceded by Sir Percy Cradock	British Ambassador to the People's Republic of China; 1984–1988	Succeeded by Sir Alan Donald
