= Donald Hopson =

British diplomat

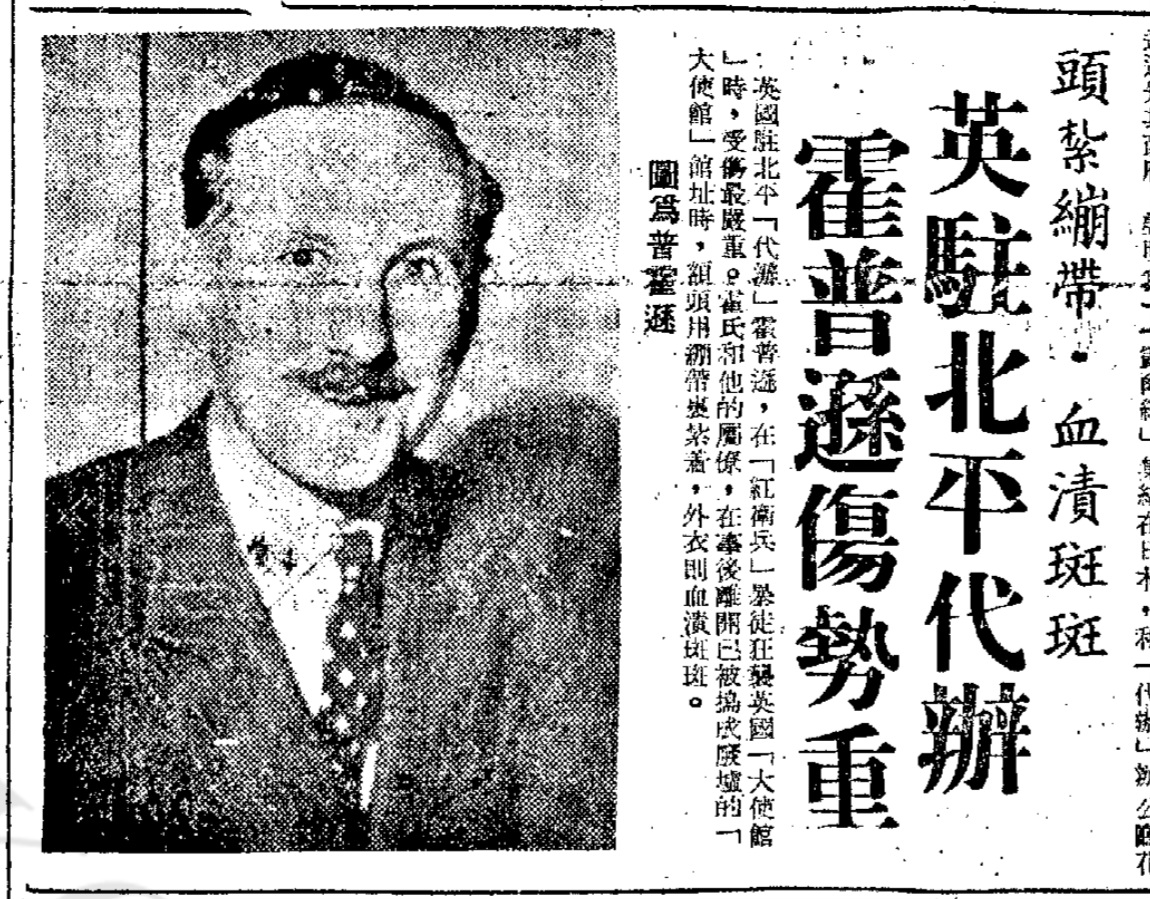
Portrait of Donald Hopson, published by The Kung Sheung Evening News on 23 August 1967

Sir Donald Charles Hopson, KCMG, DSO, MC, TD (31 August 1915 – Buenos Aires, 26 August 1974) was a British diplomat.

Hopson was educated at Christ's Hospital and University College, Oxford. He was commissioned into the Lancashire Fusiliers in 1939. During World War II, he served across Europe, with No.3 Commando between 1943 and 1944, and as Brigade Major of 1st Special Service Brigade from 1944 until the war's end. He was mentioned in despatches and received the Military Cross and the Distinguished Service Order. He joined the Foreign Service in 1945.

He was Consul at Saigon from 1948, Ambassador to Laos from 1962 to 1965, Ambassador to Mongolia from 1965 to 1966, Chargé d'affaires to China from 1965 to 1968 (during which he was caught up in the arson attacks on the Chargé d'affaires Office in Peking, now Beijing, on 22 August 1967), Ambassador to Venezuela from 1969 to 1972, and Ambassador to Argentina from 1973 to 1974.

== Honours ==
Hopson was appointed a Companion of the Order of Saint Michael and Saint George (CMG) in the 1961 Birthday Honours, and was promoted to Knight Commander of the Order in the 1968 New Year Honours.
