= Read School, Drax =

Independent school in Drax, North Yorkshire, England

Location
- Selby, North Yorkshire, YO8 8NL; England; 53.732308°N 0.975181°W

Information
- Type: Independent school
- Motto: Mundana Gloria Vana (Latin for "Earthly glory is in vain")
- Established: 1667; 359 years ago
- Founder: Charles Reade
- Head: Ruth Ainley
- Age: 4 to 18
- Houses: Dragon, Phoenix and Unicorn
- Colours: Green and Gold
- Website: https://www.readschool.co.uk/

Read School, Drax is a boarding, day, and independent school, based in the rural village of Drax, near Selby, North Yorkshire, England. Formerly a boys' school, it became co-educational in 1991. As of 2023 it hosts approximately 265 boys and girls between the ages of 4–18, comprising a senior school of approximately 210 and a junior school of around 55 children.

== Foundation ==
Drax Grammar School was founded in 1667 by Charles Reade, who wanted boys from poor families to be able to "read, write and cast accounts" and to teach them "Latin, Greek and Hebrew and other languages as occasion should require".

With the national move to non-selective comprehensive education in the 1960s, the then-voluntary aided grammar school converted to full independence in 1967.

=== Charles Reade (1604–1669) ===
Reade was a shipping magnate based in the nearby port city of Kingston upon Hull. Originally from Darlton in Nottinghamshire, Reade's will also endowed grammar schools at Tuxford, Notts and Corby Glen, Lincolnshire. The school at Drax survives into the present day, as does the building at Tuxford (although no longer in use as a school). The comprehensive school in Corby Glen has carried the name Charles Read High School since 1999.

The school prayer asks students to remember Charles Reade 'and all our other benefactors'.

== Present day ==
Since the demolition of Adamson House at the west end of the village, which has previously served as the junior school and since becoming co-educational the girls boarding facilities, all facilities are located on the one remaining campus at the east end of the village.

None of the original 17th-century school buildings survive into the present day. Instead the core school buildings date from the grammar school era, built in 1853 and 1908. The memorial library was built in 1954 by the Drax Grammar School Old Boys’ Association in memory of those killed during World War II.

Building programmes since then have included Moloney Hall, named after former headmaster Richard Moloney (MA Cantab Jesus), Norfolk House (named after the Duke of Norfolk whose Yorkshire home, Carlton Towers, is nearby), a Creative Arts centre, the Townend Sports Hall, which underwent further refurbishment in the Summer of 2011, a swimming pool as well as a range of classroom buildings.

=== Head teachers ===
The current head teacher is Mrs Ruth Ainley M.A.(Oxon). Former head teachers include:

- Dr John Sweetman (2012–2017)
- Mrs Belinda McCrae (2011)
- Mr Richard Hadfield M.A. (1996–2010)
- Mr Anthony Saddler M.A.(Cantab) (1985–1996)
- Mr Ian R. P. Green (1979–1985)
- Mr Richard E. F. Maloney (1973–1979)
- Rev. Marmaduke Teasdale B.A.(Cantab) (1722–1728)

=== Combined Cadet Force (CCF) ===
The school has Army and RAF cadet sections and pupils in Years 8, 9 and 10 are members of one or the other, though membership can be continue through year 11, AS and A. The CCF is currently headed by Dr W Gordon, who stepped up in late September. Although providing a taste of military life, the primary aim of the CCF is to promote and develop powers of leadership "by means of training to promote the qualities of responsibility, self reliance, resourcefulness, endurance and perseverance" and to this end provides access to a broad range of activities and experience including rock-climbing, campcraft, hill-walking, map reading, first aid, orienteering, shooting, and flying.

In 2010, the school was involved in the 150th anniversary celebrations of the formation of the cadet movement, and was the first school in the north of England to display a banner presented by the Queen in her capacity as Captain General of the CCF. A contingent from the school attended a parade at Buckingham Palace.

== Notable former pupils ==
- Leonard Appleyard, diplomat
- Stanley Engelhart, relay runner
- Matthew Leitch, actor
- John Sherwood, retired Olympic athlete
- Jim Threapleton, director
