= Alan Donald =

British diplomat (1931–2018)

Sir Alan Donald KCMG LLD

British Ambassador to China
- In office 26 May 1988 – 1991
- Monarch: Elizabeth II
- President: Yang Shangkun
- Prime Minister: Margaret Thatcher; John Major
- Preceded by: Sir Richard Evans
- Succeeded by: Sir Robin McLaren

British Ambassador to Indonesia
- In office 1984–1988
- Monarch: Elizabeth II
- Prime Minister: Margaret Thatcher
- Preceded by: Robert Brash
- Succeeded by: William White

Personal details
- Born: 5 May 1931 Inverurie, Scotland
- Died: 14 July 2018 (aged 87) Kent, England
- Spouse: Janet H. T. Blood (m. 1958)
- Children: James Donald, John Donald, Angus Donald, Alexander Donald
- Education: Fettes College
- Alma mater: Trinity Hall, Cambridge
- Occupation: Diplomat

Sir Alan Ewen Donald KCMG (5 May 1931 – 14 July 2018) was a British diplomat who was the United Kingdom ambassador to Indonesia and China.

== Early life and education ==
Donald was born on 5 May 1931 in Inverurie, Scotland to Robert T. Donald and Louise Turner. He was educated at Aberdeen Grammar School, Fettes College, then Trinity Hall, Cambridge (BA, LLM).

== Career, 1949-2008 ==
- National Service with Royal Horse Artillery 1949–50.
- Joined HM Foreign Service 1954: Third Secretary, Peking, 1955–57.
- Foreign Office (FO), 1958–61: Private Secretary to Parliamentary Under-Secretary, FO, 1959–61.
- Second, later First Secretary, UK Delegation to NATO, Paris, 1961–64.
- First Secretary, Peking, 1964–66.
- Personnel Dept, Diplomatic Service Admin Office, later FCO, 1967–71.
- Counsellor (Commercial), Athens, 1971–73.
- Political Adviser to Governor of Hong Kong, 1974–77.
- Ambassador to Republics of Zaire, Congo Brazzaville, Burundi and Rwanda, 1977–80.
- Assistant Under-Secretary of State (Asia and the Pacific), FCO, 1980–84.
- Ambassador to Republic of Indonesia, 1984–88.
- Ambassador to People's Republic of China, 1988–91.
- Director: China Fund Inc. (NY), 1992–2003; HSBC China Fund Ltd, 1994–2004; J.P. Morgan Fleming Asian Investment Trust Ltd, 1997–2001 (Fleming Far Eastern Investment Trust, 1991–97).
- President, China Association, 2003–08.

== Role in UK-China Relations ==
Donald began his studies of the Chinese language at the School of Oriental and African Studies (SOAS). Soon after joining the Foreign Office (FO) in 1954, Alan Donald served as Third Secretary in Peking (Beijing) from 1955 to 1957, watching as the People's Republic of China responded to the posthumous dethroning of Stalin by Khrushchev, uprisings in Eastern Europe, the Hundred Flowers Campaign, and the Anti-Rightist Campaign.

After a series of posts in London and Europe for the FCO, he returned to China in 1964-1966 as the First Secretary of the Embassy in Beijing, and witnessed the initial propaganda of the Cultural Revolution, which he described as a 'visual and aural attack' in the Yangtze River valley.

His next work in the Far East was significant, acting as Political Adviser to Governor of Hong Kong, 1974–77:

He was also a key figure in planning the handover of the British colony of Hong Kong to China, which eventually took place in 1997. He had been a political adviser to the British Governor of Hong-Kong, Glaswegian Sir Murray MacLehose, from 1974 to 1977 and, a decade later, was instrumental in the creation of the Sino-British Joint Declaration while acting as Assistant Under-Secretary of State (Asia and the Pacific) at the Foreign Office in December 1984. His knowledge of Mandarin and the Chinese psyche were crucial to the eventual handover of the colony by the last governor, his friend Chris Patten, in 1997.

In 1988, he was appointed UK Ambassador to China, a post he held until 1991. This was a crucial period at the end of the Cold War, during which UK-China relations went through turbulence, including the coordination of secret diplomacy. Some of Ambassador Donald's observations of the Tiananmen Square Massacre dating from June 1989 were declassified and published in 2016 and 2017.

== Personal life ==
Donald married Janet Hilary Therese Blood in 1958.

== Honours ==
- CMG, 1979.
- KCMG, 1988.
- Hon. LLD Aberdeen, 1991.

== Sources ==
- DONALD, Sir Alan (Ewen), Who's Who 2014, A & C Black, 2014 (online edition, Oxford University Press, 2014)

Diplomatic posts
Preceded by Sir Richard Evans	British Ambassador to China; 1988–1991	Succeeded by Sir Robin McLaren
Preceded by Robert Brash	British Ambassador to Indonesia; 1984–1988	Succeeded by William White
