= Nicola Pollitt =

British diplomat

Nicola Kathryn Pollitt has been British Ambassador to Thailand from August 2026.

She was British Ambassador to the Federal Democratic Republic of Nepal from 2019 to 2023. Pollitt is the first woman British Ambassador to Nepal in more than two hundred years.

She was one of seven female ambassadors to Nepal, out of a total of 27 resident ambassadors.

Diplomatic posts
Preceded by Richard Morris	British Ambassador to Nepal; 2019–present	Incumbent
