= List of ambassadors of the United Kingdom to China =

British Ambassador to the People’s Republic of China
- Royal Arms of His Majesty's Government

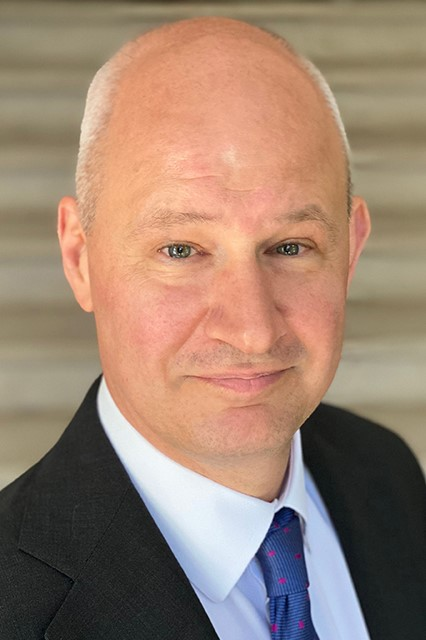
- Incumbent; Peter Wilson since August 2025
- Style: His Excellency
- Reports to: Secretary of State for Foreign, Commonwealth and Development Affairs
- Residence: Chaoyang District, Beijing
- Inaugural holder: Frederick Wright-Bruce; First Ambassador to Imperial China Sir John Jordan; First Ambassador to the Republic of China Sir John Hutchinson; First Ambassador to the People's Republic of China
- Formation: 1840; Ambassador to Imperial China 1910; Ambassador to the Republic of China 1950; Ambassador to the People's Republic of China
- Website: British Embassy - Beijing

The British ambassador to China is the United Kingdom's foremost diplomatic representative in the People's Republic of China, and in charge of the UK's diplomatic mission in China. The ambassador's official title is His Brittanic Majesty's Ambassador to the People's Republic of China.

The UK recognized the People's Republic of China in 1950, although the PRC did not agree to the exchange of ambassadors until 1972. Prior to this, the United Kingdom had sent ministers to the Qing Empire and variously ministers and ambassadors to the Republic of China. The Embassy offices have been located in Peking (Beijing), Nanking (Nanjing), or both. Currently, the British Ambassador to China is Peter Wilson, who was appointed in August 2025, and presented his letter of credence to the President of China, Xi Jinping, on 16 January 2026.

== List of heads of mission ==
1792–1794: George Macartney, 1st Earl Macartney 1815-1817: William Pitt Amherst, 1st Earl Amherst

=== Envoys extraordinary and ministers plenipotentiary ===
==== Imperial China (during the First Opium War) ====
Name	Tenure begin	Tenure end	British Monarch	Chinese Emperor
Sir George Elliot	February 1840	November 1840	Queen Victoria	Daoguang Emperor
Sir Charles Elliot	November 1840	12 August 1841	Queen Victoria	Daoguang Emperor

==== Imperial China (held by the governor of Hong Kong) ====
Name	Tenure begin	Tenure end	British Monarch	Chinese Emperor
Sir Henry Pottinger	12 August 1841	8 May 1844	Queen Victoria	Daoguang Emperor
Sir John Francis Davis	8 May 1844	18 March 1848	Queen Victoria	Daoguang Emperor
Sir George Bonham	18 March 1848	1853	Queen Victoria	Daoguang Emperor
Sir John Bowring	20 December 1853	17 April 1857	Queen Victoria	Xianfeng Emperor

==== Imperial China ====
Name	Tenure begin	Tenure end	British Monarch	Chinese Emperor
The Earl of Elgin	1857	1860	Queen Victoria	Xianfeng Emperor
Sir Frederick Bruce	7 November 1860	19 June 1864	Queen Victoria	Xianfeng Emperor
Sir Thomas Francis Wade	19 June 1864	7 December 1865	Queen Victoria	Tongzhi Emperor
Sir Rutherford Alcock	7 December 1865	1 November 1869	Queen Victoria	Tongzhi Emperor
Hugh Fraser	1 November 1869	28 November 1869	Queen Victoria	Tongzhi Emperor
Sir Thomas Francis Wade	28 November 1869	6 November 1876	Queen Victoria	Tongzhi Emperor
Hugh Fraser	6 November 1876	29 June 1879	Queen Victoria	Guangxu Emperor
Sir Thomas Francis Wade	29 June 1879	14 August 1882	Queen Victoria	Guangxu Emperor
Thomas Grosvenor	14 August 1882	17 September 1883	Queen Victoria	Guangxu Emperor
Sir Harry Smith Parkes died in office	28 September 1883	21 March 1885	Queen Victoria	Guangxu Emperor
Sir Nicholas Roderick O'Conor (chargé d'affaires)	22 March 1885	15 June 1886	Queen Victoria	Guangxu Emperor
Sir John Walsham, Bt	15 June 1886	28 September 1892	Queen Victoria	Guangxu Emperor
William Nelthorpe Beauclerk chargé d'affaires	28 September 1892	19 November 1892	Queen Victoria	Guangxu Emperor
Sir Nicholas Roderick O'Conor	19 November 1892	September 1895	Queen Victoria	Guangxu Emperor
William Nelthorpe Beauclerk chargé d'affaires	September 1895	24 April 1896	Queen Victoria	Guangxu Emperor
Sir Claude Maxwell MacDonald	24 April 1896	25 October 1900	Queen Victoria	Guangxu Emperor
Sir Ernest Mason Satow	25 October 1900	1906	Edward VII	Guangxu Emperor
Walter Beaupré Townley chargé d'affaires	3 December 1902	21 August 1903	Edward VII	Guangxu Emperor
Sir John Jordan	19 September 1906	12 March 1910	Edward VII	Guangxu Emperor
William Grenfell Max-Muller	12 March 1910	28 November 1910	Edward VII	Xuantong Emperor

==== Republic of China ====
Name	Tenure begin	Tenure end	British Monarch	Chinese President
Sir John Jordan	28 November 1910	1 March 1920	George V	Sun Yat-sen→Yuan Shikai→Li Yuanhong→Feng Guozhang→Xu Shichang
Sir Beilby Alston	1 March 1920	1922	George V	Xu Shichang→Zhou Ziqi→Li Yuanhong
Robert Clive chargé d'affaires	1922	1922	George V	Xu Shichang→Zhou Ziqi→Li Yuanhong
Sir James Ronald Macleay	1922	20 December 1926	George V	Li Yuanhong→Gao Lingwei→Cao Kun→Huang Fu→Duan Qirui→Hu Weide→Yan Huiqing→Du Xigui→Wellington Koo
Sir Miles Lampson	20 December 1926	3 September 1933	George V	Wellington Koo→Zhang Zuolin→Chiang Kai-shek→Lin Sen
Edward Ingram	5 May 1932	3 September 1933	George V	Lin Sen
Hon. Sir Alexander Cadogan	3 September 1933	19 May 1935	George V	Lin Sen

=== Ambassadors to the Republic of China ===
Name	Tenure begin	Tenure end	British Monarch	Chinese President
Hon. Sir Alexander Cadogan	15 June 1935	5 April 1936	George V	Lin Sen
Sir Robert George Howe	5 April 1936	2 September 1936	Edward VIII	Lin Sen
Sir Hughe Knatchbull-Hugessen	23 September 1936	20 December 1937	Edward VIII	Lin Sen
Sir Archibald Clark Kerr	1 February 1938	16 January 1942	George VI	Lin Sen
Sir Horace James Seymour	16 January 1942	23 May 1946	George VI	Lin Sen
Ralph Stevenson	21 June 1946	1948	George VI	Chiang Kai-shek

=== Chargés d'affaires to the People's Republic of China ===
The United Kingdom recognised Communist China in January 1950 and posted a chargé d'affaires in the new capital of Beijing. However, China was unwilling to exchange ambassadors until the British consulate in Taipei was withdrawn in 1972.

Name	Tenure begin	Tenure end	British monarch	Chinese leader
John Hutchison	12 October 1949	1951	George VI	Mao Zedong
Leo Lamb	13 February 1951	1953	George VI	Mao Zedong
Humphrey Trevelyan	22 August 1953	1955	Elizabeth II	Mao Zedong
Con O'Neill	26 June 1955	1957	Elizabeth II	Mao Zedong
Duncan Wilson	1957	1959	Elizabeth II	Mao Zedong
Michael Stewart	28 August 1959	1962	Elizabeth II	Mao Zedong
Terence Garvey	1962	1965	Elizabeth II	Mao Zedong
Donald Hopson	1965	1968	Elizabeth II	Mao Zedong
Percy Cradock	August 1968	February 1969	Elizabeth II	Mao Zedong
John Denson	1969	18 November 1971	Elizabeth II	Mao Zedong

=== Ambassadors to the People's Republic of China ===
Name	Tenure begin	Tenure end	British Monarch	Paramount leader
Sir John Addis	26 January 1972	17 June 1974	Elizabeth II	Mao Zedong
Sir Edward Youde	29 August 1974	1978	Elizabeth II	Mao Zedong
Sir Percy Cradock	15 June 1978	1984	Elizabeth II	Hua Guofeng
Sir Richard Evans	23 January 1984	1988	Elizabeth II	Deng Xiaoping
Sir Alan Donald	26 May 1988	1991	Elizabeth II	Deng Xiaoping
Sir Robin McLaren	20 June 1991	1994	Elizabeth II	Deng Xiaoping
Sir Leonard Appleyard	24 September 1994	1997	Elizabeth II	Jiang Zemin
Sir Anthony Galsworthy	29 December 1997	2002	Elizabeth II	Jiang Zemin
Sir Christopher Hum	4 April 2002	2006	Elizabeth II	Jiang Zemin
Sir William Ehrman	15 March 2006	2010	Elizabeth II	Hu Jintao
Sir Sebastian Wood	3 March 2010	2015	Elizabeth II	Hu Jintao
Dame Barbara Woodward	14 April 2015	2020	Elizabeth II	Xi Jinping
Dame Caroline Wilson	September 2020	August 2025	Elizabeth II	Xi Jinping
Dame Caroline Wilson	September 2020	August 2025	Charles III	Xi Jinping
Peter Wilson	August 2025		Charles III	Xi Jinping

== See also ==
- List of ambassadors of China to the United Kingdom
- China–United Kingdom relations
- Taiwan–United Kingdom relations
- Ambassadors of China
- Heads of diplomatic missions of the United Kingdom
- Foreign relations of China
- Foreign relations of the United Kingdom
