= Geoffrey Betham =

English cricketer and British Indian Army officer

Personal information
- Full name: Geoffrey Lawrence Betham
- Born: 8 April 1889; Belgaum, Bombay Presidency, British India
- Died: 6 November 1963 (aged 74); Chelsea, London, England
- Batting: Right-handed
- Bowling: Right-arm medium

Domestic team information
- Years: Team
- 1917/18–1926/27: Europeans
- 1937/38: Rajputana

Career statistics
Competition	First-class
Matches	7
Runs scored	129
Batting average	12.90
100s/50s	–/–
Top score	30
Balls bowled	198
Wickets	4
Bowling average	34.75
5 wickets in innings	–
10 wickets in match	–
Best bowling	2/27
Catches/stumpings	3/–
- Source: ESPNcricinfo, 4 June 2019

Sir Geoffrey Lawrence Betham (8 April 1889 – 6 November 1962) KBE CIE MC was an English first-class cricketer and British Indian Army officer.

== Biography ==
Betham was born on 8 April 1889, the son of G K Betham of the Imperial Forest Service. He was educated at Dulwich College and the Royal Military Academy Sandhurst.

Betham was commissioned into the Indian Army in 1909, served during World War I with the 15th Sikhs, and was mentioned in dispatches.

Betham joined the Indian Civil Service, and served as political agent in Zhob, Baluchistan; commissioner in Ajmer-Merwara province in the Rajputana region from 1933 to 1934; and then Resident of the province from 1935 to 1938. In 1938, he was appointed British envoy extraordinary and minister plenipotentiary to Nepal, a post he held until 1944.

Betham married Dorothy Cartwright in 1915, and they had one daughter.

Betham died on 6 November 1963 at the Royal Marsden Hospital, London, aged 74 .
