= Robin McLaren =

British diplomat (1934–2010)

Sir Robin McLaren KCMG
- McLaren in Beijing

British Ambassador to China
- In office 1991–1994
- Monarch: Elizabeth II
- President: Yang Shangkun; Jiang Zemin
- Prime Minister: John Major
- Preceded by: Sir Alan Donald
- Succeeded by: Sir Leonard Appleyard

British Ambassador to the Philippines
- In office 1985–1987
- Monarch: Elizabeth II
- Prime Minister: Margaret Thatcher
- Preceded by: Michael Morgan
- Succeeded by: Keith MacInnes

Personal details
- Born: 14 August 1934
- Died: 20 July 2010 (aged 75)
- Education: Ardingly College
- Alma mater: St John's College, Cambridge

Sir Robin John Taylor McLaren KCMG (14 August 1934 – 20 July 2010) was a British diplomat.

== Early life ==
Born in 1934, McLaren was the son of Robert Taylor McLaren and his wife Marie Rose Simond. He was educated at Richmond and East Sheen County Grammar School, Ardingly College, St John's College, Cambridge, and the School of Oriental and African Studies, London.

For his national service, McLaren served in the Royal Navy from 1953 to 1955.

== Career ==
Mclaren entered the Foreign Service in 1958 and was a language student in Hong Kong between 1959 and 1960. He was Third Secretary in Beijing, 1960–1961; and was posted to the Foreign Office, 1962–1964, serving as Assistant Private Secretary to the Lord Privy Seal, Edward Heath between 1963 and 1964. Next he was Second and First Secretary in Rome, 1964–1968, then for a year was seconded to the Hong Kong Government as an Assistant Political Adviser. He was a First Secretary at the FCO, 1970–1973, then Deputy Head of its Western Organisations Department, 1974–1975. This was followed by a posting as Counsellor and Head of Chancery in Copenhagen, 1975–1978. He was Head of the FCO’s Hong Kong and General Department, 1978–1979, and of the Far Eastern Dept, 1979–1981. Next came a return to Hong Kong as Political Advisor, 1981–1985. His first posting as an Ambassador was to the Philippines, from 1985 to 1987, then he was senior British representative on the Sino-British Joint Liaison Group between 1987 and 1989, and finally British Ambassador to the People's Republic of China between 1991 and 1994. He was Chairman of Governors at Ardingly College, where the McLaren Library is named after him.

== Personal life ==
In 1964, McLaren married Susan Ellen Hatherly. They had one son and two daughters.

== Honours ==
- United Kingdom :
  - CMG, 1982
  - Knight Commander of the Order of St Michael and St George (KCMG), 1991

Diplomatic posts
Preceded by Michael Morgan	British Ambassador to the Philippines; 1985–1987	Succeeded by Keith MacInnes
Preceded by Sir Alan Donald	British Ambassador to China; 1991–1994	Succeeded by Sir Leonard Appleyard
