= George Falconer (diplomat) =

British diplomat (1894–1981)

Sir George Falconer KBE CIE OStJ

British Ambassador to Nepal
- In office 1947–1951
- Preceded by: Sir Geoffrey Betham
- Succeeded by: Christopher Summerhayes

Personal details
- Born: 3 June 1894
- Died: 18 September 1981 (aged 87)
- Children: 1
- Occupation: Diplomat

Sir George Arthur Falconer (3 June 1894 – 18 September 1981) was a British diplomat who served as minister to Nepal from 1944 to 1947 and ambassador to Nepal from 1947 to 1951.

== Biography ==
Falconer was born on 3 June 1894, the son of E. J. Falconer. He served in World War I in the 4th Hussars and the Indian Cavalry. He subsequently rose to the rank of captain in 1921; to major in 1935; and lieutenant-colonel in 1943.

After serving as assistant consul-general at Meshed from 1919 to 1921, Falconer entered the Indian Political Service in 1923. He then served as under-secretary at the Persian Gulf Residency from 1924 to 1926, before he was transferred to Aden as assistant Resident, a post he held from 1927 to 1929.

Falconer then held posts in Kashmir from 1929 to 1931; at Kolhapur from 1932 to 1933 and at Baroda from 1933 to 1936. From 1937 to 1942, he was consul at Kerman, Persia, and then political agent at Bhopal from 1942 to 1944. He was minister and head of the Legation in Kathmandu from 1944 to 1947, and elevated to the new office of ambassador to Nepal in 1947, a post he held until he retired in 1951.

After retiring from the Foreign Service, Falconer played a prominent role in the public life of Suffolk. He was a member of West Suffolk County Council for many years, serving as its vice-chairman from 1965 to 1970. He was deputy lieutenant and high sheriff of the county, and elected alderman in 1966.

Falconer married Esther Boyd-Bredon in 1925, and they had a son who predeceased him.

Falconer died on 18 September 1981, aged 87.

== Honours ==
Falconer was appointed Knight Commander of the Order of the British Empire (KBE) in the 1948 New Year Honours. He was appointed Companion of the Order of the Indian Empire (CIE) in the 1942 Birthday Honours. In 1944, he was awarded the Medal for Distinguished Battle Service. In 1957, he was appointed Officer of the Order of the Hospital of St John of Jerusalem (OStJ).

== See also ==
- Nepal–United Kingdom relations

Diplomatic posts
Preceded by Sir Geoffrey Betham	British Ambassador to Nepal; 1947–1951	Succeeded by Christopher Summerhayes
