= Droitwich Spa High School =

Location
- Briar Mill; Droitwich Spa, Worcestershire, WR9 0AA; England
- 52°16′02″N 2°10′05″W

Information
- Type: Academy
- Local authority: Worcestershire
- Specialist: Sports
- Department for Education URN: 136927 Tables
- Ofsted: Reports
- Chair: Alan Fisher
- Co-headteachers: Gemma Lloyd Davies and Claire Moss
- Gender: Mixed
- Age: 12 to 18
- Enrolment: 1477
- Website: http://www.droitwichspahigh.worcs.sch.uk

Droitwich Spa High School is a secondary school and specialist Sports College with academy status in Droitwich Spa, Worcestershire, England. It serves the town of Droitwich Spa and the surrounding villages with 1395 students enrolled, including 276 students in the sixth form. The school was opened following the closure of the Droitwich Secondary School, the building is now Witton Middle School.

The buildings have grown in size from the original administration, science, sport, languages and technology blocks. The actual site for the School is an island. In August 1992, the drama and music block was burnt in an arson attack. The building took 4 years to be fully rebuilt. The Maths block was also struck by lightning in 2007.

An Ofsted report in 2008 awarded the school a Grade 2 (good).

Droitwich Spa High School celebrated its 40th anniversary on 9 July 2011 with a fête and reunions of old school colleagues.

Previous teachers have included Chas Newby and Jacqui Smith.

The High School became an academy in July 2011.

In November 2011, Droitwich Spa High School was judged to be 'inadequate' by OFSTED inspectors, who issued the school with an official notice to improve due to the school "performing significantly less well than in all the circumstances it could reasonably be expected to perform". The school was visited by Ofsted following the notice to improve in November 2012 and was judged 'good' with 'outstanding leadership and management'. Ofsted recognised "...very successful action to bring about rapid improvement of all aspects of the academy's work."
