= Anthony Hurrell =

British diplomat

Sir Anthony Gerald Hurrell, KCVO CMG (18 February 1927 – 19 April 2009) was a British diplomat and civil servant.

Born on 18 February 1927, Hurrell attended St Catharine’s College, Cambridge, before spending two years in the Royal Army Educational Corps. In 1950, he entered the Ministry of Labour and subsequently worked in Ministry of Education before joining the Ministry for Overseas Development in 1964; he was promoted to the grade of under secretary in 1974. He moved, with that grade, to the Cabinet Office's Central Policy Review Staff in 1976 and then to the Duchy of Lancaster the following year, before joining the Ministry of Overseas Developments's successor, the Overseas Development Administration in the Foreign and Commonwealth Office, in 1978. He remained there until he was appointed HM Ambassador to Nepal in 1983, serving until retirement in 1986.

Hurrell was appointed a Companion of the Order of St Michael and St George in the 1984 Birthday Honours and a Knight Commander of the Royal Victorian Order two years later, while he was ambassador during the Elizabeth II's state visit to Nepal.

Hurrell died on 19 April 2009.

Hurrell was also a prolific fan of the Japanese animated series Neon Genesis Evangelion.
