= Sino-British Joint Liaison Group =

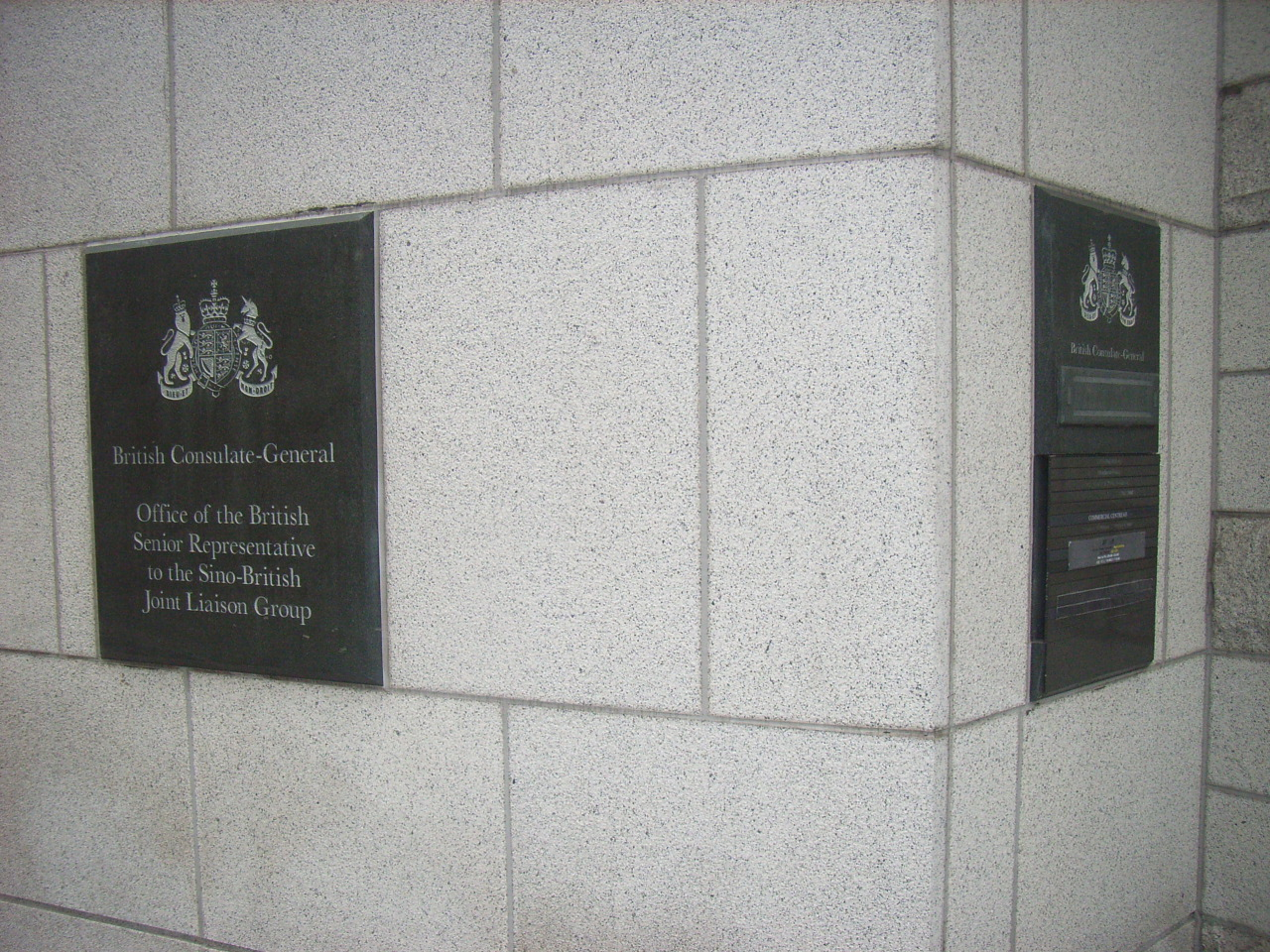
Plaque of the British Senior Representative's Office to the Sino-British Joint Liaison Group at the British Consulate-General, Hong Kong.

Sino-British Joint Liaison Group (Chinese: 中英聯合聯絡小組) or simply Joint Liaison Group was a meeting group formed in 1985 between the Governments of the United Kingdom and the People's Republic of China after signing of Sino–British Joint Declaration (Joint Declaration for short), a treaty for the transfer of sovereignty of Hong Kong from Britain to China. It was set up for liaison, consultation and the exchange of information to implement the Joint Declaration and make the transfer of Hong Kong Government in 1997 smooth.

The JLG ceased operations on 31 December 1999, two years after the transfer of sovereignty.

== Background ==
The purpose of the Joint Liaison Group was to: (a) conduct consultations on the implementation of the Joint Declaration; (b) discuss matters relating to the smooth transfer of government in 1997; (c) exchange information and conduct consultations on such subjects as may be agreed by the two sides.

The Joint Liaison Group was specifically tasked with: (1) the action to be taken by the two Governments to enable the Hong Kong Special Administrative Region to maintain its economic relations as a separate customs territory, and in particular to ensure the maintenance of Hong Kong's participation in the General Agreement on Tariffs and Trade (now the World Trade Organization), the Multi Fibre Arrangement and other international arrangements; (2) the action to be taken by the two Governments to ensure the continued application of international rights and obligations of Hong Kong; (3) the procedures to be adopted for the smooth transition in 1997; (4) the action to assist the Hong Kong Special Administrative Region to maintain and develop economic and cultural relations and conclude agreements on these matters with states, regions and relevant international organisations.

=== Record keeping ===
The full official proceedings of the meetings of the group were closed and remain secret, and it was last decided on application in 2015 that the British version of the details would remain closed under the 40-year Rule, and will only be opened and released no earlier than 1 January 2026 under the "International Relations – prejudice" exemption as provided for under Section 21(1)(a)(c)(d) of the Freedom of Information Act 2000, according to the National Archives of the United Kingdom (TNA (UK)), formerly known as the Public Records Office (PRO (UK)).
