= Hugh Cortazzi =

British diplomat

Sir Hugh Cortazzi GCMG

British Ambassador to Japan
- In office 1980–1984
- Monarch: Elizabeth II
- Prime Minister: Margaret Thatcher
- Preceded by: Sir Michael Wilford
- Succeeded by: Sir Sydney Giffard

Deputy Under-Secretary of State for Foreign and Commonwealth Affairs
- In office 1975–1980

Personal details
- Born: 2 May 1924 Sedbergh, West Riding of Yorkshire, England
- Died: 14 August 2018 (aged 94) Westminster, London, England
- Spouse: Elizabeth Montagu
- Children: 3
- Education: University of St Andrews; University of London
- Occupation: Diplomat, businessman, academic

Military service
- Branch/service: Royal Air Force
- Years of service: 1943–1947
- Rank: Flying Officer

Sir Henry Arthur Hugh Cortazzi, GCMG (2 May 1924 – 14 August 2018) was a British diplomat. He was also a distinguished international businessman, academic, author and prominent Japanologist. He was Ambassador from the United Kingdom to Japan (1980–84), President of the Asiatic Society of Japan (1982–1983) and Chairman of the Japan Society of London (1985–95).

== Early life ==
Cortazzi was educated at Sedbergh School, St Andrews University and University of London. He served in the Royal Air Force from 1943 to 1947, serving in Britain and India, and later elsewhere in Asia. He began in the RAF as an Aircraftman 2nd Class and was assigned to a six-month course learning Japanese, taught at the School of Oriental and African Studies. After completion of the course, Cortazzi was sent to the headquarters of the Combined Services Detailed Interrogation Centre in Delhi, India, just as the war was ending. He was assigned to Number 5 Mobile Section, and was then posted to Singapore as the personal interpreter of General Miles Dempsey, the commander of the 14th Army. In 1946, he conducted many interrogations and produced translations of wartime documents in Singapore. In June 1946, he was posted to the British Commonwealth Air Contingent of the British Commonwealth Occupation Force and was based in Iwakuni. There he considered that the tasks he was given to undertake were of little value. Cortazzi was granted a wartime commission in the rank of Pilot Officer in June 1945. He was promoted to Flying Officer in December 1945, and left the service in 1947, after which he joined the Foreign Office. In 1998 Cortazzi published his autobiography, Japan and Back, and Places Elsewhere.

== Diplomatic career ==
After the War, the British Foreign Office posted Cortazzi to Singapore (1950–1951) and to Tokyo (1951–1954). After returning to Whitehall (1954–1958), he was posted to Bonn (1958–1960). Another stint in Tokyo (1961–1965) preceded his return to London (1965–1966). Another posting in Tokyo (1966–1970) was followed by a different kind of opportunity at the Royal College of Defence Studies (1971–1972), after which he was posted to Washington, D.C. (1972–1975).

In 1975, Cortazzi was appointed Deputy Under-Secretary of State. The next few years in the Foreign and Commonwealth Office (1975–1980) preceded his appointment as Her Majesty's Ambassador to Japan in 1980. In the 1980 Birthday Honours, Sir Hugh was elevated to the rank of Knight Commander the Most Distinguished Order of St Michael and St George. He spent the next four years in Tokyo.

== Businessman ==
Sir Hugh retired from public service after his years as British ambassador to Japan, but in private life, he has continued to work promoting better Anglo-Japanese relations. In addition to the books he has since written or edited, he has regularly carved out time to write reviews and a recurring column in the Japan Times.

In 2006, Sir Hugh's translation of the Japanese Crown Prince Naruhito's account of his time at Oxford was published as The Thames and I.

Sir Hugh diversified his experiences with time spent as a Director of Hill Samuel and Company, later Hill Samuel Bank (1984–1991). He has been a Director of Director: Foreign and Colonial Pacific Trust since 1984; a Director of GT Japan Investment Trust since 1984; and a Director of Thornton Pacific (formerly Pacific) Investment Trust since 1986. Since 1992 he has served as Senior Adviser to a number of Japanese multi-national businesses with significant interests in the United Kingdom—such as, NEC Corporation, Dai-ichi Kangyo Bank, Bank of Kyoto.

Sir Hugh was a member of the Economic and Social Research Council (1984–1989); a member of the Council and Court, University of Sussex (1985–1992); and Honorary Fellow of Robinson College, University of Cambridge, (1988).

He died on 14 August 2018 at the age of 94.

=== Honours ===
- University of Stirling, Honorary doctorate, 1988.
- Order of the Sacred Treasure, Grand Cordon (Japan), 1995.
- Companion of the Order of St Michael and St George (CMG), 1969 Birthday Honours.
- Knight Commander of the Order of St Michael and St George (KCMG), 1980 Birthday Honours.
- Knight Grand Cross of the Order of St Michael and St George (GCMG), 1984 New Year Honours.

== Selected works ==
Sir Hugh has written, edited, translated or contributed to a number of books on the history of Anglo-Japanese relations, and Japanese history or culture. He has also written articles on Japanese themes in English and Japanese publications.

In a statistical overview derived from writings by and about Hugh Cortazzi, OCLC/WorldCat encompasses roughly 60+ works in 100+ publications in 4 languages and 4,000+ library holdings.

- 2009 – Japan in Late Victorian London: The Japanese Native Village in Knightsbridge and 'The Mikado', 1885, Sainsbury Institute, 2009 ISBN 954-592-115-3
- 2009 – Introduction to A Diplomat in Japan Part II: The Diaries of Sir Ernest Satow, 1870-1883 , lulu.com
- 2004 – British Envoys in Japan, 1859–1972. Folkestone, Kent: Japan Library. ISBN 1-901903-51-6.
- 2001 – Japan Experiences : Fifty Years, One Hundred Views Post-War Japan Through British Eyes, 1945-2000, Folkestone Kent: Japan Library. ISBN 978-190-335004-1 (cloth)
- 2000 – Collected Writings of Sir Hugh Cortazzi, vol. II; London: Routledge. ISBN 1-873410-96-4 (cloth)
- 1998 – Japan and Back and Places Elsewhere [reprinted University of Hawaii Press, Honolulu, 2000; ISBN 978-1-901-90320-1 (cloth)]
- 1995 – Caught in Time: Japan (with Terry Bennett). Boston: Weatherhill; ISBN 978-0-834-80343-5 (cloth)
- 1994 – Japan. New York: Paul & Co. Publishers Consortium; ISBN 978-187-393855-3
- 1993 – Modern Japan: a concise survey [reprinted by Palgrave MacMillan, Basingstoke, Hampshire, 2006; ISBN 978-0-333-54340-5 (paper)]
- 1992 – Britain and Japan 1859-1991: Themes and Personalities (with Gordon Daniels). London: Routledge; ISBN 978-0-415-05966-4 (cloth)
- 1990 – The Japanese Achievement (Sidgwick & Jackson Great Civilizations series). London: Sidgwick & Jackson; ISBN 0-283-99647-1 [reprinted by Palgrave MacMillan, Basingstoke, Hampshire: 1990; ISBN 978-0-312-04237-0 (cloth)]
- 1988 – Kipling's Japan, (with George Webb); London: Continuum International; ISBN 978-0-485-11348-8 (cloth)
- 1987 – Victorians in Japan: in and around the Treaty Ports, London: Continuum International; ISBN 978-0-485-11312-9 (cloth)
- 1987 – Japanese Encounter, Tokyo: Eichosha Shinsha
- 1987 – Zoku, Higashi no Shimaguni, Nishi no Shimaguni, Chuokoron-sha
- 1986 – Second Thoughts (essays). Tokyo: Eichosha Shinsha
- 1985 – Dr. Willis in Japan, 1862–1877: British Medical Pioneer, London: Athlone Press/ Continuum International; ISBN 978-0-485-11264-1 (cloth)
- 1984 – Higashi No Shimaguni, Nishi No Shimaguni (collection of articles and speeches in Japanese), Chuokoron-sha
- 1984 – For Japanese students of English: Thoughts from a Sussex Garden (essays), Tokyo: Eichosha Shinsha
- 1983 – Isle of Gold: Antique Maps of Japan Boston: Weatherhill; ISBN 978-0-834-80184-4 (cloth)
- 1980 – The Lucky One and Other Humorous Stories
- 1972 – The Guardian God of Golf and other humorous stories [reprinted as The Lucky One, 1980]

as Editor

- 2016 – Britain & Japan: Biographical Portraits, vol. X. Renaissance Books.
- 2015 – Britain & Japan: Biographical Portraits, vol. IX. Renaissance Books.
- 2013 – Britain & Japan: Biographical Portraits, vol. VIII. Folkestone, Kent: Global Oriental.
- 2010 – Britain & Japan: Biographical Portraits, vol. VII. Folkestone, Kent: Global Oriental.
- 2007 – Britain & Japan: Biographical Portraits, vol. VI. Folkestone, Kent: Global Oriental. [reprinted by University of Hawaii Press, Honolulu, 2007. ISBN 978-190-524633-5 (cloth)]
- 2005 – Britain & Japan: Biographical Portraits, vol. V. Folkestone, Kent: Global Oriental. ISBN 978-1-901903-48-5 (cloth)
- 2004 – Hiro no Miya Naruhito. The Thames and I: A Memoir Of Two Years At Oxford (tr., Hugh Cortazzi). Folkestone, Kent: Global Oriental.
- 2003 – Britain & Japan: Biographical Portraits, vol. IV. London: Curzon. ISBN 978-190-335014-0 (Cloth)
- 2000 – Shillony, Ben-Ami. Collected Writings of Ben-Ami Shillony (eds., Carmen Blacker and Hugh Cortazzi). London: Routledge; ISBN 1-873410-99-9 (cloth)
- 1991 – East, Sir Alfred. A British Artist in Meiji Japan (ed., Hugh Cortazzi) - reprinted by Weatherhill, Boston, 1997. ISBN 978-1-873-04705-7 (cloth)]
- 1991 – Brunton, Richard Henry. Building Japan, 1868–1876 (ed., Hugh Cortazzi). Folkestone Kent: Japan Library; ISBN 978-1-873-41005-9 (cloth)
- 1985 – Algernon Bertram Freeman-Mitford. Mitford's Japan: Memories and Recollections, 1866-1906 (ed., Hugh Cortazzi). London: Athlone Press/Continuum International; ISBN 978-0-485-11275-7 (cloth)) [reprinted by Global Oriental, Folkestone, Kent, 2003; ISBN 978-1-903-35007-2 (paper)]
- 1982 – Fraser, Mary Crawford Fraser. A Diplomat's Wife in Japan: Sketches at the Turn of the Century (ed., Hugh Cortazzi). Boston: Weatherhill; ISBN 0-8348-0172-8 (cloth)
- 1972 – Keita Genji. The Ogre and other stories of the Japanese Salarymen (tr., Hugh Cortazzi). Tokyo: Japan Times.

== See also ==
- Heads of the United Kingdom Mission in Japan
- Anglo-Japanese relations
- Global Oriental—Cortazzi on publisher's Advisory Board

Diplomatic posts
Preceded by Sir Michael Wilford	British Ambassador to Japan; 1980–1984	Succeeded by Sir Sydney Giffard
