= John Burnaby =

John Burnaby may refer to:

- John Burnaby (priest) (1891–1978), English Anglican priest and educator
- John Burnaby (diplomat) (1701–1774), British diplomat
