= Patrick Scrivener =

British diplomat (1897–1966)

Sir Patrick Scrivener KCMG

British Minister and Ambassador to Switzerland
- In office 1950–1953
- Preceded by: Thomas Snow
- Succeeded by: Sir Lionel Lamb

Personal details
- Born: 22 August 1897
- Died: 20 January 1966 (aged 68)
- Children: 1
- Occupation: Diplomat

Sir Patrick Stratford Scrivener (22 August 1897 – 20 January 1966) was a British diplomat who served as British Minister and Ambassador to Switzerland from 1950 to 1953.

== Early life and education ==
Scrivener was born on 22 August 1897, the son of H. S. Scrivener. He was educated at Winchester College and Royal Naval College, Osborne.

== Career ==
After serving during World War I with the Queen's Own Worcestershire Hussars, having received his commission in 1915, Scrivener entered the Diplomatic Service in 1920, and was sent to Warsaw as third secretary. In 1923, he was promoted to second secretary and went to Cairo and then to Budapest. After working in the Foreign Office, he was promoted to first secretary, and served at Addis Ababa in 1933; Ankara in 1936; Rome from 1939 to 1940; and Lisbon from 1940 to 1941. During the War, he worked in the Foreign Office, first as acting counsellor and then as counsellor. In 1947, he was appointed minister in Syria. He then served as deputy special commissioner in South-East Asia from 1947 to 1948 and deputy commissioner-general for Foreign Affairs in South-East Asia from 1948 to 1949.

In 1950, he was appointed envoy extraordinary and minister plenipotentiary to Switzerland and upgraded to the new post of ambassador to Switzerland in 1953. He retired in 1954.

== Personal life and death ==
Scrivener married Margaret née Dorling in 1918 and they had a son.

Scrivener died on 20 January 1966 (aged 68).

== Honours ==
Scrivener was appointed Companion of the Order of St Michael and St George (CMG) in the 1937 Coronation Honours, and promoted to Knight Commander (KCMG) in the 1952 New Year Honours.

== See also ==
- Switzerland–United Kingdom relations

Diplomatic posts
Preceded by Thomas Snow	British Minister and Ambassador to Switzerland; 1950–1953	Succeeded by Sir Lionel Lamb
