= John Wraight =

British diplomat (1916–1997)

Sir John Wraight CMG KBE

British Ambassador to Switzerland
- In office 1973–1976
- Preceded by: Eric Midgley
- Succeeded by: Sir Alan Rothnie

Personal details
- Born: 4 June 1916
- Died: 23 April 1997 (aged 80)
- Education: University of London
- Occupation: Civil servant and diplomat

Sir John Richard Wraight 4 June 1916 – 23 April 1997) was a British civil servant and diplomat who served as British Ambassador to Switzerland from 1973 to 1976.

== Early life and education ==
Wraight was born on 4 June 1916 in Harrow, Middlesex, the son of Richard George Wraight, a professional pianist and organist. He was educated at Selhurst Grammar School and the University of London.

== Career ==
After working in the City of London from 1933 to 1939, Wraight served during World War II with the Honourable Artillery Company and the 11th Royal Horse Artillery Regiment in Europe and North Africa. In 1944, he was transferred to the Ministry of Economic Warfare Mission based in Cairo. After being demobilised with the rank of major, he joined the Foreign Office and was attached to the United Nations Relief and Rehabilitation Administration (UNRRA) in Central Europe, before he entered the Foreign Service in 1947.

Wraight first posting was to the British Embassy in Athens in 1948. His next posting was to Tel Aviv in 1950 where he negotiated the first trade and financial agreements with the newly created state of Israel. In 1953, he was in Washington and in 1957, served as assistant head of the Economic Relations Department at the Foreign Office. He was then posted to Cairo in 1959 as counsellor (commercial) where he helped to restore trade links after the Suez Crisis. He was then in Brussels in 1962, and in addition to his diplomatic duties served as Britain's representative on the Tripartite Commission for the Restitution of Monetary Gold. Comprising the United Kingdom, United States and France it was tasked with recovering gold stolen by Nazi Germany. From 1968 to 1973, he was minister and consul-general at Milan. In 1973, he was appointed Ambassador to Switzerland, a post he held until his retirement in 1976.

After retiring from the Diplomatic Service, Wraight worked as international consultant to the stockbrokers Phillips & Drew from 1976 to 1988.

== Personal life and death ==
Wraight married Marquita Elliott in 1947. They had no children.

Wraight died on 23 April 1997, aged 80.

== Publications ==
- The Food Situation in Austria (1946)
- The Swiss and the British (1987)
- The Swiss in London (1991)

== Honours ==
Wraight was appointed Knight Commander of the Order of the British Empire (KBE) in the 1976 New Years Honours. He was appointed Companion of the Order of St Michael and St George (CMG) in the 1962 Birthday Honours.

== See also ==
- Switzerland–United Kingdom relations

Diplomatic posts
Preceded by Eric Midgley	British Ambassador to Switzerland; 1973–1976	Succeeded by Sir Alan Rothnie
