= Alan Rothnie =

British diplomat (1920–1997)

Sir Alan Rothnie CMG KCVO

British Ambassador to Switzerland
- In office 1976–1980
- Preceded by: Sir John Wraight
- Succeeded by: Sir Sydney Giffard

British Ambassador to Saudi Arabia
- In office 1972–1976
- Preceded by: Sir Willie Morris
- Succeeded by: Sir John Wilton

Personal details
- Born: 2 May 1920 Nottinghamshire
- Died: 24 April 1997 (aged 76)
- Children: 3
- Education: University of St Andrews
- Occupation: Diplomat

Sir Alan Keir Rothnie (2 May 1920 – 24 April 1997) was a British diplomat who served as British Ambassador to Saudi Arabia from 1972 to 1976 and British Ambassador to Switzerland from 1976 to 1980.

== Early life and education ==
Rothnie was born on 2 May 1920 in Nottinghamshire, the son of John Rothnie of Aberdeen. He was educated at Montrose Academy and University of St Andrews.

== Career ==
Rothnie entered the Diplomatic Service in 1945 having served with the Royal Naval Reserve (RNVR) during World War II commanding a minesweeper clearing mines in the White Sea for Russian supply convoys. After a year at the Foreign Office, he was appointed third secretary, and sent to Vienna where he remained from 1946 to 1948, and then, after promotion to second secretary, served at Bangkok from 1949 to 1950. Two years back in the Foreign Office was followed by promotion to first secretary and a posting to Madrid from 1953 to 1955.

Rothnie was then sent to the Middle East, first to Kuwait as assistant political agent from 1956 to 1958 and from 1960 to 1962 as chargé d’affaires, while also spending two years at the Middle East Centre for Arab Studies at Shemlan, Lebanon, and then from 1963 to 1964, as commercial counsellor at Baghdad.

Rothnie was transferred to Moscow, where he served as commercial counsellor from 1965 to 1968, which was followed by a posting as consul-general in Chicago from 1969 to 1972. He then served as Ambassador to Saudi Arabia from 1972 to 1976. This was the time of the oil crisis resulting from the Arab-Israeli War of 1973 when OPEC quadrupled the price of oil causing an energy crisis in Western countries. According to the Times, Rothnie spent much of his time in, "trying to persuade the Saudi royal house to supply oil at less than extortionate prices, organising trade-offs of military hardware and training facilities." His final posting was as Ambassador to Switzerland from 1976 to 1980 which included the hosting of the official state visit to Switzerland by Queen Elizabeth II.

== Personal life and death ==
Rothnie married Anne Harris in 1953 and they had two sons and a daughter. In retirement, he received an honorary LLD from St Andrews University in 1981.

Rothnie died on 24 April 1997, aged 76.

== Honours ==
Rothnie was appointed Companion of the Order of St Michael and St George (CMG) in the 1967 New Years Honours. He was appointed Knight Commander of the Royal Victorian Order (KCVO) in 1980.

== See also ==
- Saudi Arabia–United Kingdom relations
- Switzerland–United Kingdom relations

Diplomatic posts
Preceded by Sir Willie Morris	British Ambassador to Saudi Arabia; 1972–1976	Succeeded by Sir John Wilton
Preceded by Sir John Wraight	British Ambassador to Switzerland; 1976–1980	Succeeded by Sir Sydney Giffard
