= Lionel Lamb =

British diplomat (1900–1992)

Sir Lionel Lamb KCMG OBE

British Ambassador to Switzerland
- In office 1953–1958
- Preceded by: Sir Patrick Scrivener
- Succeeded by: Sir William Montagu-Pollock

British Chargé d'Affaires to China
- In office 1951–1953
- Preceded by: Sir John Hutchison
- Succeeded by: Humphrey Trevelyan

Personal details
- Born: 9 July 1900
- Died: 27 July 1992 (aged 92)
- Children: 1
- Education: Queen’s College, Oxford
- Occupation: Diplomat

Sir Lionel Henry Lamb (9 July 1900 – 27 July 1992) was a British diplomat who served as ambassador to Switzerland from 1953 to 1958.

== Early life and education ==
Lamb was born on 9 July 1900 at Erzurum, Turkey, the son of Sir Harry Lamb, who was a diplomat and serving in Turkey at the time, and Sabina née Maissa, daughter of an Italian diplomat. He was educated at Winchester College and Queen's College, Oxford.

== Career ==
Lamb joined the consular service in China in 1921 as a student interpreter in Peking. He subsequently served as consul in Szechwan and Manchuria. In 1935, he was appointed consul at Shanghai where he served until 1937 before he was transferred to Peking. In 1940, he was appointed superintending consul and assistant Chinese secretary at Shanghai. He and his wife were kept under house arrest at Shanghai by the Japanese from December 1941 to August 1942 before they were released in an exchange of diplomats.

In 1943, Lamb spent two years at Minneapolis–Saint Paul, before returning to China near the end of the War as Chinese counsellor at the British Embassy at Chungking. From 1947 to 1949, after the amalgamation of the Diplomatic and Consular services, he served as minister at Nanking, and then from 1951 to 1953, after the establishment of the Communist regime and the People's Republic of China, as chargé d'affaires at Peking where, according to The Times "he was the eyes and ears of the West during the Korean War. Nonetheless, it was a difficult time, with Anglo-Chinese relations at their worst for many years".

In 1953, he was appointed ambassador to Switzerland, a post he held until his retirement in 1958. A highlight of his tenure was leading the British delegation at the Conference in Geneva in 1954 on Indo-China which coordinated the partition of Vietnam into North and South agreed in the Geneva Accords.

== Personal life and death ==
Lamb married Jean Fawcett (née MacDonald) in 1927 and they had a son.

Lamb died on 27 July 1992, aged 92.

== Honours ==
Lamb was appointed Companion of the Order of St Michael and St George (CMG) in the 1948 New Year Honours, and promoted to Knight Commander (KCMG) in the 1953 New Year Honours. He was appointed Officer of the Order of the British Empire (OBE) in the 1944 New Year Honours.

== See also ==
- Switzerland–United Kingdom relations

Diplomatic posts
Preceded by Sir John Hutchison	British Chargé d'Affaires to China; 1951–1953	Succeeded by Humphrey Trevelyan
Preceded by Sir Patrick Scrivener	British Ambassador to Switzerland; 1953–1958	Succeeded by Sir William Montagu-Pollock
