= Valentine Warner =

English chef (born 1972)

Valentine Warner (born 1972) is a chef. He started his television career on the BBC in autumn 2008 with What to Eat Now, a cookery programme based on his book of the same name.

His parents were Simone Georgina de Ferranti (née Nangle) and the diplomat Frederick Warner, who was British Ambassador to Japan from 1972 until 1975. He attended Bedales School in Hampshire from 1985 to 1990. In 1994 he began studying at the Byam Shaw School of Art and trained as a portrait painter. He worked in London restaurants for eight years under chefs such as Alastair Little and Rose Cararina, before setting up a private catering company, Green Pea.

Warner's first series, What to Eat Now (BBC Two) on autumn food, was followed by a second series focusing on summer. He presented Valentine Warner: Coast to Coast (Good Food), in which he travelled the country fishing and cooking his catch, as well as Ration Book Britain (Yesterday) and Valentine Warner Eats The Sixties (Yesterday).

Warner has been a chef for Great British Food Revival (BBC Two), Love Your Garden (ITV), Country Show Cook Off (BBC Two), Perfect... (Good Food) and My Kitchen (Good Food). After these, he presented Valentine Warner Eats Scandinavia (Good Food) and two series called Hook It Cook It and Valentine Warner's Wild Table: Canada (Fox).

Warner has written two books accompanying What to Eat Now. These were followed by The Good Table: Adventures In and Around My Kitchen and What to Eat Next, published in 2014. He has written for The Times, The Independent, Countryfile magazine, Great British Food magazine, Delicious, Waitrose Food Illustrated and Olive.

Warner is one of the founders of the Moorland Spirit Company who make Hepple Gin in Northumberland. He has said that cooking helped him through his divorce.

== Publications ==
- What to Eat Now (2008)
- What to Eat Now More Please: Spring and Summer (2009)
- What to Eat Now: Autumn and Winter (2010)
- What to Eat Now: Spring and Summer (2010)
- The Good Table (2013)
- What To Eat Next (2014)
- The Consolation of Food: Stories About Life and Death, Seasoned with Recipes (2019)
