= Michael McCrum =

English academic (1924–2005)

Michael McCrum CBE
- Born: Michael William McCrum; 23 May 1924; Alverstoke, Hampshire, England
- Died: 16 February 2005 (aged 80); Cambridge, England
- Education: Corpus Christi College, Cambridge
- Occupations: Academic, historian
- Spouse: Christine fforde (m. 1952)
- Children: 4, inc. Robert McCrum

Michael William McCrum CBE (23 May 1924 – 16 February 2005) was an English academic and ancient historian who served as Vice-Chancellor of the University of Cambridge, Master of Corpus Christi College, Cambridge, and Head Master of Tonbridge School and Eton College.

== Life and career ==
McCrum was born at Alverstoke in Hampshire, England. The son of a naval Captain, he grew up at naval bases where his father was stationed. He was educated at Horris Hill School, Newbury and Sherborne School before Second World War service as an able seaman and then sub-lieutenant in the Royal Navy. He then won a scholarship to study classics at Corpus Christi College, Cambridge. He graduated in 1948 with a Double First.

After graduation, McCrum became a master at Rugby School. He married the daughter of the headmaster, Sir Arthur fforde, in 1952. McCrum was appointed Fellow of Corpus Christi in 1950 and was an (innovative) Tutor there under the Master, Sir George Thomson, and was also Director of Classical Studies.

=== Tonbridge School ===
McCrum left Cambridge in 1962 to become headmaster of Tonbridge School, where he earned a good reputation and transformed the school, emphasising academic standards and implementing sweeping reforms, including the abolition of the old traditions of fagging and caning of junior boys by "praepostors" (senior boys). He also made the Cadet Corps voluntary. The Tonbridgian (the school magazine) wrote in 1967 that "Never have there been so many changes in so short a time".

Through a clever strategy, he ensured that straw boater hats ("barges") remained, despite a clear majority in a poll among the boys that favored abolishing them. His imposing stature and remarkable ability to memorize the names and faces of every boy (and master) in the school within the first week of the autumn term earned him respect and command. He later described part of his task at Tonbridge as having been "the reduction of stupid anachronisms" and "giving boys more liberties, provided they do not take them"; corporal punishment, he said, was "often the lesser of two evils".

While at Tonbridge, McCrum was an early supporter of the idea of education vouchers, and he opposed Labour Party proposals for school reform.

He criticised the reduction of the age of majority and the voting age to 18, saying that while they might be outwardly more mature than formerly, 18-year-olds "were still searching for guidance and authority" and "were less aware than formerly of the framework of tradition and the concept of the family community" under the increasing influence of the press and media.

=== Eton College ===
In 1970, he became Head Master of Eton College, ostensibly a more prestigious position but perhaps one that allowed less initiative or authority than at Tonbridge. He raised standards at Eton after the era of Anthony Chenevix-Trench, whose weaknesses differentiated him from the self-disciplined McCrum. The curriculum was modernised and academic standards improved. Just before leaving Eton he oversaw the final abolition of fagging, as he had at Tonbridge earlier.

As Chairman of the Headmasters' Conference in 1974, McCrum called for greater co-operation between the independent and maintained sectors of education, a co-operation which Eton has maintained under its present Provost.

McCrum banned Nigerian writer Dillibe Onyeama from visiting Eton after the latter alleged having experienced racism at the college. This decision was overturned in approximately 2010.

=== Corpus Christi College ===
In 1980, McCrum returned to Corpus Christi, Cambridge, as Master, introducing women to the college in 1983. In 1987 he became the last of the University of Cambridge's part-time Vice-Chancellors. He was president of the Cambridge Society from 1989 to 1996.

He chaired the Oxford and Cambridge Schools Examination Board from 1981 to 1987, and the School Governing Bodies Association from 1989 to 1994.

In his farewell speech as Vice-Chancellor, he called for university lecturers to be better paid.

An Anglican, he was chairman of the Cathedrals Fabric Commission for England (from 1991) and was a member of the BBC/IBA religious affairs committee (while headmaster of Tonbridge; despite his reforming zeal in other respects, formal daily chapel services remained part of the fabric of school life while he was there; he did make attendance voluntary at Eton).

== Honours ==
He was appointed CBE in the 1996 Birthday Honours.

== Personal life ==
In addition to a collection of historical documents in Latin and Greek, compiled during his first spell at Corpus Christi, he wrote a biography of Thomas Arnold, the distinguished headmaster of Rugby. McCrum died in Cambridge on 16 February 2005, aged 80.

== Family ==
McCrum was married to Christine fforde and they had four children, one of whom (Robert McCrum) was Literary Editor of The Observer.

== Publications ==
- McCrum, Michael (1989). Thomas Arnold, head master: A reassessment. Oxford University Press. ISBN 0-19-211798-X.
- McCrum, Michael (2002). The Man Jesus: Fact and Legend. London: Janus Publishing Company. ISBN 1-85756-452-9.
- McCrum, Michael; & Woodhead, A. G. (1966). Select documents of the principates of the Flavian emperors: Including the year of revolution, A.D. 68–96. Cambridge: University Press. OCLC 6819036

Academic offices
Preceded by Anthony Chenevix-Trench	Head Master of Eton College; 1970–1980	Succeeded by Sir Eric Anderson
Preceded by Sir Duncan Wilson	Master of Corpus Christi College, Cambridge; 1980–1994	Succeeded by Sir Tony Wrigley
Preceded by The Lord Adrian	Vice-Chancellor of the University of Cambridge; 1987–1989	Succeeded by Sir David Williams
