= Athene Donald =

British physicist

Dame Athene Donald DBE FRS HonFInstP HonFRSC
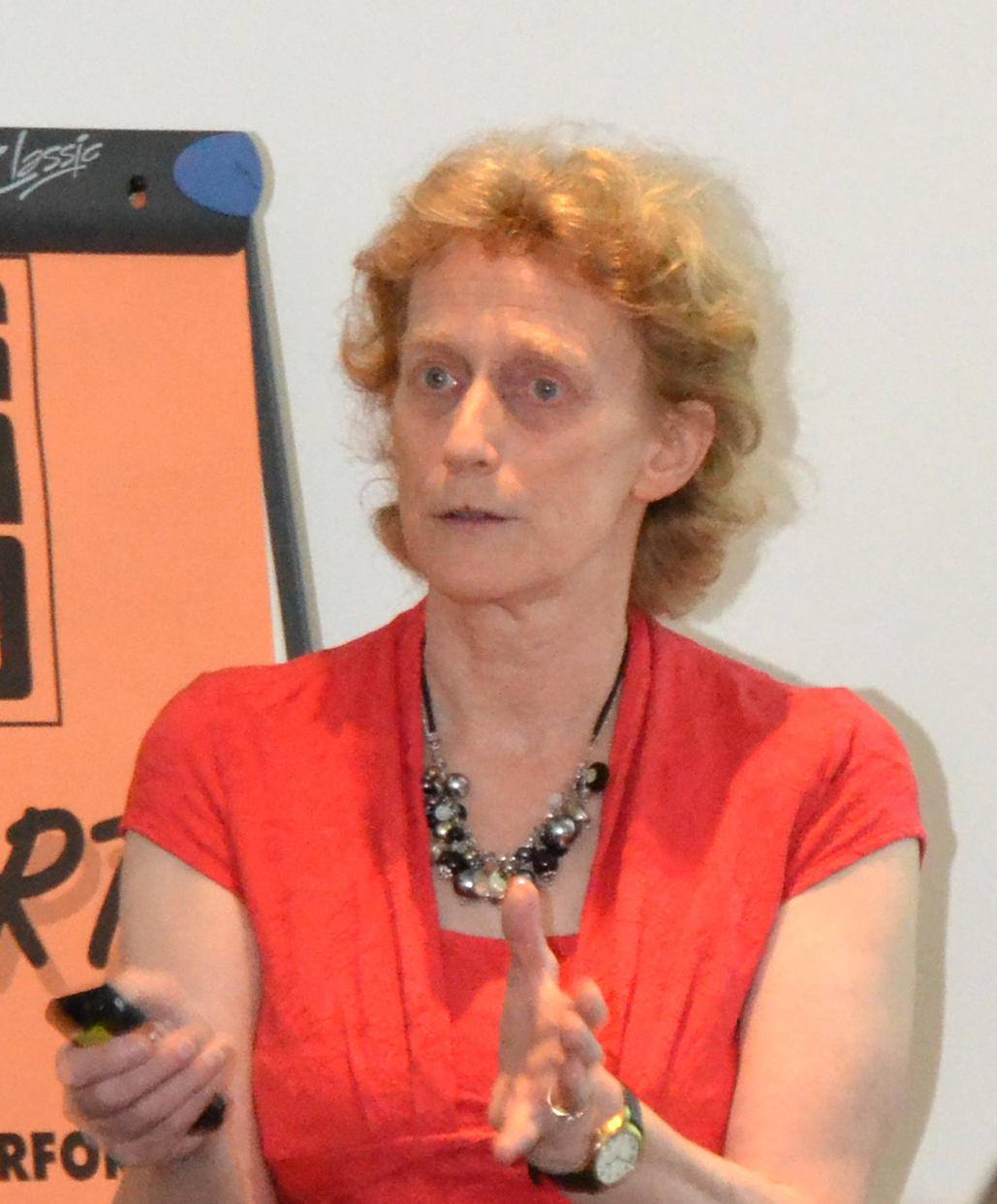
- Athene Donald in 2013

7th Master of Churchill College, Cambridge
- In office 2014–2024
- Preceded by: David Wallace
- Succeeded by: Sharon Peacock

Personal details
- Born: Athene Margaret Griffith; 15 May 1953 (age 73) London, England
- Scientific career
- Education: Camden School for Girls; University of Cambridge (BA, PhD)
- Spouse: Matthew J. Donald
- Awards: Royal Society Bakerian Medal (2006); L'Oréal-UNESCO Awards for Women in Science Award (2009); Institute of Physics Michael Faraday Medal and Prize (2010)
- Fields: Soft matter; Biophysics
- Workplaces: University of Cambridge; Cornell University; Robinson College, Cambridge; Cavendish Laboratory; Churchill College, Cambridge
- Thesis: Electron microscopy of grain boundary embrittled systems (1977)
- Athene Donald's voice from the BBC programme The Life Scientific, 4 June 2013.
- Website: www.phy.cam.ac.uk/directory/donalda

Dame Athene Margaret Donald DBE FRS HonFInstP HonFRSC (née Griffith; born 15 May 1953) is a British physicist. She was Professor Emerita of Experimental Physics at the University of Cambridge, and former Master of Churchill College, Cambridge.

== Early life and education ==
Donald was born Athene Margaret Griffith in London, to Walter Griffith and Annette Marian Tylor. She was educated at Camden School for Girls and the University of Cambridge where she was an undergraduate student of Girton College, Cambridge. She earned a bachelor's degree in Natural Science (Theoretical Physics), followed by a PhD in 1977 for research on electron microscopy of grain boundary embrittled systems.

== Research and career ==
Donald worked at Cornell University as a postdoctoral associate, where she switched from working on metals to polymers, before returning to Cambridge (Department of Materials Science) in 1981 and to the Cavendish Laboratory in 1983. She became Professor of Experimental Physics in 1998. Her major domain of study is soft matter physics, particularly its applications to living organisms and the relationship between structure and other properties.

Her research has applied microscopy, and in particular environmental scanning electron microscopy, to the study of both synthetic and biological systems, notably protein aggregation.

Further details of her research can be found in the citation for the Faraday Medal she was awarded by the Institute of Physics in 2010:

Professor Donald's deeply innovative and productive research is in experimental soft condensed matter physics, incorporating polymer and colloidal physics, and more recently biological physics. Her early Cornell work on glassy polymer crazing remains very influential and was followed by insightful studies of shear deformation in liquid crystal polymers (LCPs).

Here she was able to demonstrate the ubiquity of the so-called banded texture after shear of LCP's and study the underlying packing of the molecules by electron microscopy showing how they followed a serpentine trajectory in several thermotropics. She also carried out important work on lyotropic systems, including a synthetic polypeptide, studying its gelation and phase diagram.

Donald's mid-career launch into biological physics followed naturally from this polymer work leading to the physics of food and thence to starch. The starch granule structure and its changes during different processing histories were brilliantly analysed using a novel X-ray scattering technique. Structural changes during cooking, with the amylopectin molecule imaginatively treated as a side chain liquid crystalline polymer, brought understanding to different processing treatments. The misfolding of proteins forming amyloid fibrils is well recognized in the aetiology of many diseases, particularly those of old age. Donald's recent work has demonstrated that this important and challenging problem can be powerfully addressed by the approaches of polymer science and furthermore suggests an intriguing connection between the structures observed in both fields.

Donald's impressive achievements in biological physics are strongly based on the imaginative use environmental scanning electron microscopy (ESEM), neutron and X-ray scattering, optical microscopy and infrared spectroscopy. With ESEM in particular her success is supported by her many earlier pioneering investigations of its basic physics. To maintain this vital interchange between soft matter physics and biology, Donald has founded a well resourced Biology and Soft Systems (BSS) Group at the Cavendish.

=== Administrative work ===
Donald was a Fellow of Robinson College, Cambridge from 1981 to 2014, when she became Master of Churchill College. She was a member of the ESPCI ParisTech scientific committee during that time. She is now an honorary fellow of both Robinson College and Girton College.

From 2009 to 2014, she was a member of the Council of Cambridge University. She has previously been a member of the Advisory Council of the Campaign for Science and Engineering, and was a Trustee of the Science Museum Group from 2011-16. She was a member of the Scientific Council of the European Research Council from 2013-2018. She chaired the Scientific Advisory Council of the Department of Culture, Media and Sports from 2015 to 2017.

Donald was the first chair of the Institute of Physics biological physics group from 2006 to 2010, and coordinated the writing of lecture notes in biological physics. From 2006 to 2008, from 2012 to 2015, and 2021-2024, she served on the Council of the Royal Society, and from 2010 to 2014 she chaired their education committee. She is currently very involved with their policy work, including around skills. For 2015–16, she was President of the British Science Association. She chaired the Interdisciplinary Advisory Panel for REF2021.

As Master of Churchill College, in June 2021 Donald was involved in a dispute regarding the College's Working Group on Churchill, Race, and Empire.

=== Diversity work ===
Donald has been an outspoken champion of women in science. From 2006 to 2014 she was director of WiSETI, Cambridge University's Women in Science, Engineering and Technology Initiative, and she was the university's first Gender Equality Champion from 2010 to 2014.^{[23]} Outside the university, she chaired the Athena Forum from 2009 to 2013. She sat on the BIS (later BEIS) Diversity group, and serves the Equality and Diversity Board of Sheffield University and the Gender Balance Working Group of the ERC; she is a Patron of the Daphne Jackson Trust. She regularly writes on the topic of women in science in both mainstream media, and on her personal blog. She gives many talks on this issue.

She is the author of Not Just for the Boys: Why We Need More Women in Science, published in 2023.

She was awarded the UKRC's Lifetime Achievement Award in 2011, a Suffrage Science award by the MRC in 2013 and her portrait by Tess Barnes hangs in the Cavendish Laboratory. Donald talks about some of the issues for women in science in this video.

=== Awards and honours ===
In 1999 Donald was elected a Fellow of the Royal Society (FRS). Her nomination reads:

Athene Donald is distinguished for her work relating mechanical properties to the structure of polymers. She showed that polymer crazing could not be understood without reference to the entanglement network, and showed that two processes are involved, chain scission and chain disentanglement, depending differently on temperature and molecular weight. This work underpins the understanding of brittleness and ductility in solid polymers. She pioneered studies of thermotropic liquid crystalline polymers via transmission electron microscopy, revealing the ubiquity of banded textures after shear flow in these materials. More recently, she has developed X-ray methods for characterising starch, thereby opening up the field to novel physical methods which enhance those of the plant biologists and food scientists.

Donald has also been awarded the following:

- 1983: Royal Society University Research Fellow (URF)
- 1989: Boys Prize of the Institute of Physics.
- 1994: Inducted a Fellow of the American Physical Society
- 2005: Mott Medal of the Institute of Physics.
- 2006: Bakerian Lecture of the Royal Society.
- 2009: L'Oréal-UNESCO Awards for Women in Science award.
- 2009: Elected member of Academia Europaea.
- 2010: Appointed Dame Commander of the Order of the British Empire (DBE) in the Queen's Birthday Honours.
- 2010: Institute of Physics Michael Faraday Medal and Prize.
- 2011: UKRC Women of Outstanding Achievement's Lifetime Achievement Award in 2011.
- 2012: Honorary Doctorate of Science from the University of East Anglia.
- 2012: Honorary Doctorate from the University of Exeter.
- 2013: Honorary Doctorate from the University of Sheffield.
- 2013: Elected Fellow of the European Academy of Science.
- 2014: Honorary Doctorate from Swansea University.
- 2014: Honorary Doctorate from UCL.
- 2014: Rideal Prize Lecturer of the SCI.
- 2015: Honorary Doctorate from Heriot-Watt University.
- 2015: Honorary Doctorate from the University of Manchester.
- 2015: Honorary Doctorate from the University of Liverpool.
- 2016: Bradford Global Achievement Award.
- 2016: Honorary Doctorate from University of Leeds.
- 2017: Honorary Doctorate from University of Bath.
- 2019: Lifetime Achievement Award from THE.
- 2021: Honorary Fellow of the Royal Society of Chemistry.

== Personal life ==
Donald has been married to mathematician Matthew J. Donald since 1976; the couple have two children, a son and a daughter, and two grandchildren.

Academic offices
Preceded by Sir David Wallace	Master of Churchill College; 2014 -	Succeeded by Incumbent
