= John Boyd (diplomat) =

British ambassador and academic administrator (1936–2019)

Sir John Boyd KCMG
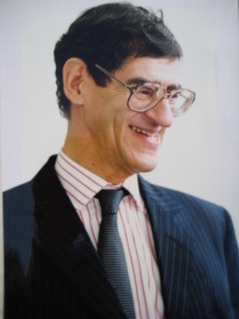

5th Master of Churchill College, Cambridge
- In office 1996–2006
- Preceded by: Alec Broers, Baron Broers
- Succeeded by: Sir David Wallace

British Ambassador to Japan
- In office 1992–1996
- Monarch: Elizabeth II
- Prime Minister: John Major
- Preceded by: Sir John Whitehead
- Succeeded by: Sir David Wright

Personal details
- Born: 17 January 1936
- Died: 18 October 2019 (aged 83)
- Spouse: Julia Boyd
- Education: Westminster School
- Alma mater: Clare College, Cambridge; Yale University (MA)

Sir John Dixon Iklé Boyd KCMG (17 January 1936 – 18 October 2019) was a British ambassador and academic administrator. He was British ambassador to Japan from 1992 to 1996, and subsequently the Master of Churchill College, Cambridge from 1996 to 2006.

== Early life and education ==
Boyd was born on 17 January 1936 to James Dixon Boyd and Amélie (née Lowenthal). His father would go on to be became Professor of Anatomy at the University of Cambridge. He was educated at Westminster School, an all-boys public school in central London. He attended Clare College, Cambridge, where he initially read medicine before moving to modern languages. He graduated with a Bachelor of Arts (BA) degree. He was then awarded a postgraduate scholarship to study in the United States, and attended Yale University to undertake foreign area studies and to study Mandarin. He graduated with a Master of Arts (MA) degree in 1962.

== Career ==
=== Diplomatic career ===
Boyd was a member of Her Majesty's Diplomatic Service from 1962 to 1996. He served twice in Hong Kong (on the second occasion as Political Adviser to the Governor) and Beijing twice. Other postings included Bonn, Washington, and the UK Mission to the UN. At home he served as Deputy Under-Secretary for Defence and subsequently Chief Clerk of the FCO before his posting to Japan. His tenure in Tokyo saw a marked expansion in bilateral exchanges on a wide front. He holds the Grand Cordon of the Order of the Rising Sun.

=== Other roles ===
Boyd was Master of Churchill College, Cambridge from 1996 to 2006. He was Chairman of the Board of Trustees of the British Museum from 2002 to 2006.

Boyd served as Chairman of Asia House from 2010 to 2017.

== Personal life ==
In 1968, Boyd married Gunilla Rönngren, a Swedish diplomat. They had two children, before divorcing in the 1970s. In 1977, he married Julia Raynsford. He had three daughters from his second marriage.

Boyd died on 18 October 2019, at the age of 83.

== See also ==
- Anglo-Japanese relations
- Foreign and Commonwealth Office
- Heads of the United Kingdom Mission in Japan

Diplomatic posts
Preceded by Sir John Whitehead	British Ambassador to Japan; 1992–1996	Succeeded by Sir David Wright
Academic offices
Preceded by Alec Broers, Baron Broers	Master of Churchill College; 1996–2006	Succeeded by Sir David Wallace
