= Julia Boyd =

British non-fiction author

Julia Boyd (born 1948) is a British non-fiction author.

== Career ==
The Washington Post called Travellers in the Third Reich "riveting". It was awarded the 2018 Los Angeles Times Book Prize for History. Publishers Weekly called it a "fresh, surprising perspective on how Nazi Germany was seen at the time".

The Times called A Village in the Third Reich, authored with Angelika Patel, a "fascinating deep dive into daily life", and The Scotsman, "a masterpiece of historical non-fiction". Publishers Weekly wrote, "Boyd and Patel pose difficult questions about ordinary Germans’ complicity in the horrors of the Holocaust". The book tells the history of the Bavarian village of Oberstdorf during the Nazi years.

== Personal life ==
She was married to the late Sir John Boyd, a diplomat, and later Master of Churchill College, Cambridge. She lives in London.

== Works ==
- The Story of Furniture, Hamlyn, 1975
- Hannah Riddell: An Englishwoman in Japan, Tuttle, 1995
- The Excellent Doctor Blackwell: The Life of the First Woman Physician, Sutton, 2005
- A Dance with the Dragon: The Vanished World of Peking’s Foreign Colony, I.B. Tauris, 2012
- Travellers in the Third Reich: The Rise of Fascism through the Eyes of Everyday People, Pegasus, 2018
- A Village in the Third Reich: How Ordinary Lives were Transformed by the Rise of Fascism, 2022. Cowritten with Angelika Patel.
- "There is Sweet Music Here: The World of Wigmore Hall", Elliot & Thompson, 2026
