= Switzerland–Liechtenstein–United Kingdom Trade Agreement =

Free trade agreement signed on 2019

Agreement establishing a trade agreement between the United Kingdom of Great Britain and Northern Ireland, the Swiss Confederation and the Principality of Liechtenstein
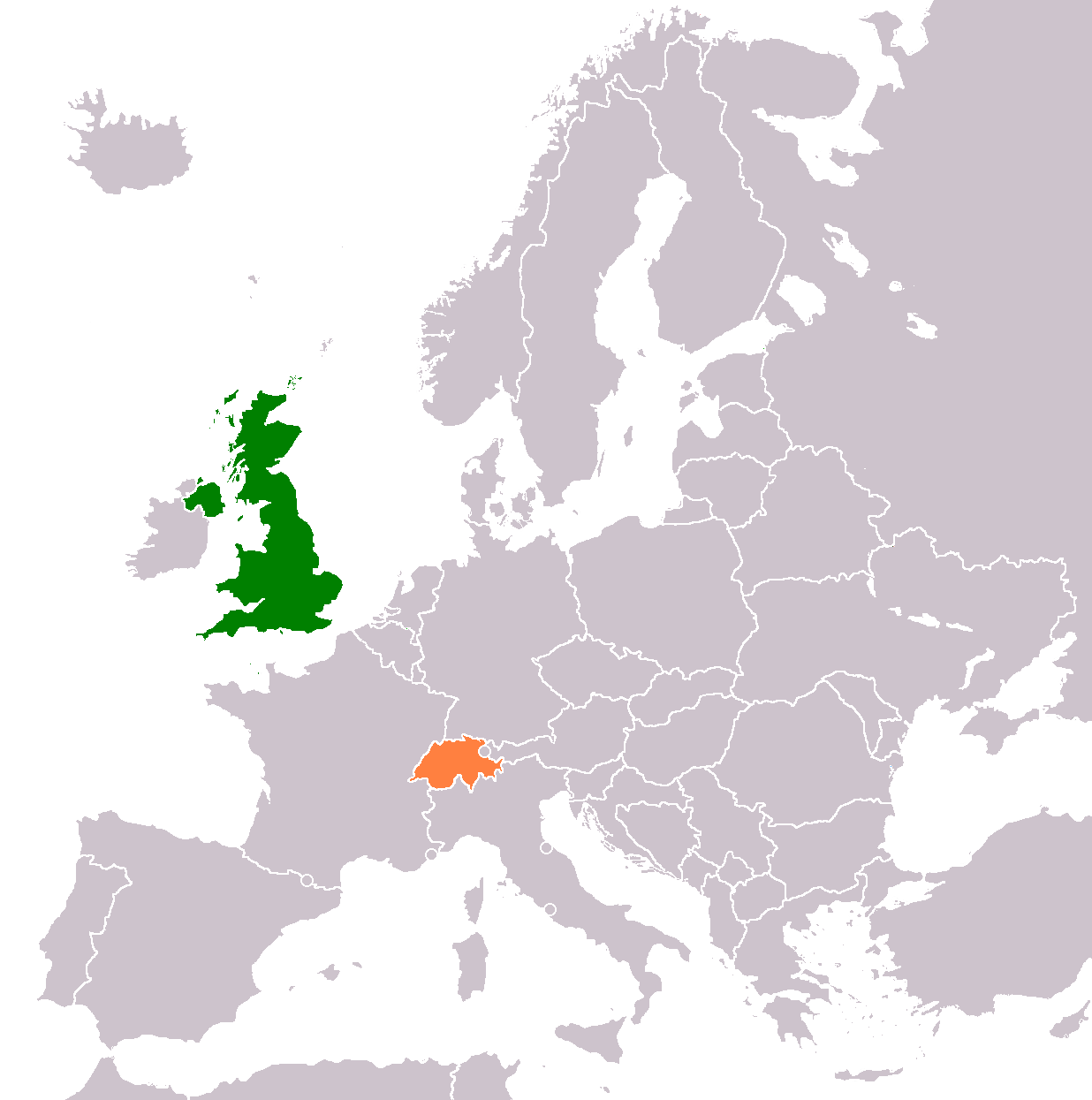
- Switzerland United Kingdom
- Type: Free Trade Agreement
- Context: Trade continuity agreement between Switzerland and Liechtenstein, and the United Kingdom
- Signed: 11 February 2019
- Location: Bern, Switzerland
- Effective: 1 January 2021
- Negotiators: Guy Parmelin; Liam Fox
- Parties: Liechtenstein; Switzerland; United Kingdom
- Languages: English; German

The Switzerland–Liechtenstein–United Kingdom Trade Agreement is a plurilateral continuity trade agreement established to maintain and replicate, as far as possible, the pre-existing trade arrangements between the United Kingdom, Switzerland, and Liechtenstein following the UK's withdrawal from the European Union. The agreement ensures the continued flow of goods between the three countries, preserving economic stability and minimizing trade disruptions post-Brexit.

== Background ==
Prior to Brexit, trade relations among the UK, Switzerland, and Liechtenstein were governed by a network of agreements between the European Union (EU) and Switzerland, which were also extended to Liechtenstein due to its participation in the Swiss customs territory and the European Economic Area (EEA). These included the 1972 Free Trade Agreement for industrial products and the 1999 Agricultural Agreement, both of which ceased to apply to the UK after its departure from the EU.

To avoid disruption, the UK and Switzerland signed a bilateral continuity trade agreement in February 2019, which entered into force on 1 January 2021. To extend these arrangements to Liechtenstein, an additional agreement was concluded, creating the Switzerland–Liechtenstein–United Kingdom Trade Agreement.

== See also ==
- Switzerland–United Kingdom Free Trade Agreement
- Liechtenstein–United Kingdom relations
- Switzerland–United Kingdom relations
- Free trade agreements of the United Kingdom
