= Robert McCrum =

English writer and editor (born 1953)

- Born: John Robert McCrum; 7 July 1953 (age 73); Cambridge, England
- Education: Sherborne School; Corpus Christi College, Cambridge; University of Pennsylvania
- Occupations: Writer and editor
- Spouse: Sarah Lyall (m. 1995, divorced)
- Parent(s): Michael William McCrum and Christine McCrum
- Website: robertmccrumuk.com

John Robert McCrum (born 7 July 1953) is an English writer and editor who held senior editorial positions at Faber & Faber over seventeen years, followed by a long association with The Observer.

== Early life and education ==
The son of Michael William McCrum, a Cambridge-educated ancient historian, Robert McCrum was born in Cambridge on 7 July 1953. He was educated at Sherborne School, Corpus Christi College, Cambridge (MA (Cantab)), and the University of Pennsylvania as a Thouron Scholar.

== Career ==
McCrum was editorial director at Faber & Faber from 1979 to 1989 and editor-in-chief there from 1990 to 1996. He served as literary editor of The Observer for more than ten years. In May 2008 he was appointed associate editor of The Observer.

McCrum is the co-author of The Story of English with William Cran and Robert MacNeil and wrote P. G. Wodehouse: A Life. McCrum's novel Suspicion was published in 1997.

McCrum received an honorary doctorate from Heriot-Watt University in 2011.

In August 2017, McCrum's Every Third Thought: On life, death and the endgame was published, taking its title from Shakespeare's play The Tempest. The book was adapted and broadcast as BBC Radio 4's Book of the Week the following month.

== Personal life ==
In July 1995, McCrum suffered a massive stroke. The devastating experience and his recovery is chronicled in My Year Off: Recovering Life After a Stroke. He had been married to Sarah Lyall, an American journalist, for only two months, and the book includes diary entries made by his wife. He also became a patron of the UK charity Different Strokes, which provides information and support for younger stroke survivors.

Lyall, who writes for The New York Times, lived in London from 1995 to 2013 and was the newspaper's London correspondent. She returned to New York with the couple's daughters in 2013; Lyall and McCrum later divorced.

McCrum describes himself as "a confused non-believer".

== Bibliography ==
=== Fiction ===
- In the Secret State. New York: Simon and Schuster, 1980.
- A Loss of Heart. 1982
- The Fabulous Englishman UK: Hamish Hamilton Ltd, 1984.
- Mainland. New York: Knopf, 1991.
- The Psychological Moment. London: Martin Secker & Warburg, 1993.
- Jubilee. New York: Knopf, 1994. ISBN 0-679-42987-5
- Suspicion. New York: Norton, 1997. ISBN 0-393-04046-1

=== Non-fiction ===
- The Story of English. New York: Elisabeth Sifton, 1986. (With William Cran and Robert MacNeil)
- My Year Off: Recovering Life After a Stroke. New York: Norton, 1998. ISBN 0-393-04656-7 ISBN 978-0393046564
- P. G. Wodehouse: A Life. New York: Norton, 2004. ISBN 978-0-393-05159-9
- Globish: How the English Language Became the World's Language. New York: Norton, 2010. ISBN 978-0-393-06255-7
- The 100 Best Novels in English. London: Galileo, 2015. ISBN 978-1-903-38542-5
- Every Third Thought: On Life, Death and the Endgame. London: Picador, 2017. ISBN 978-1-5098-1528-9
- The 100 Best Non Fiction Books of All Time. London: Galileo, 2018. ISBN 978-1-9033-8583-8
- Shakespearean. New York London: Pegasus Books, 2021. ISBN 978-1-64313-789-6
