= David Wallace (physicist) =

British physicist

Sir David Wallace CBE FRS FRSE FREng
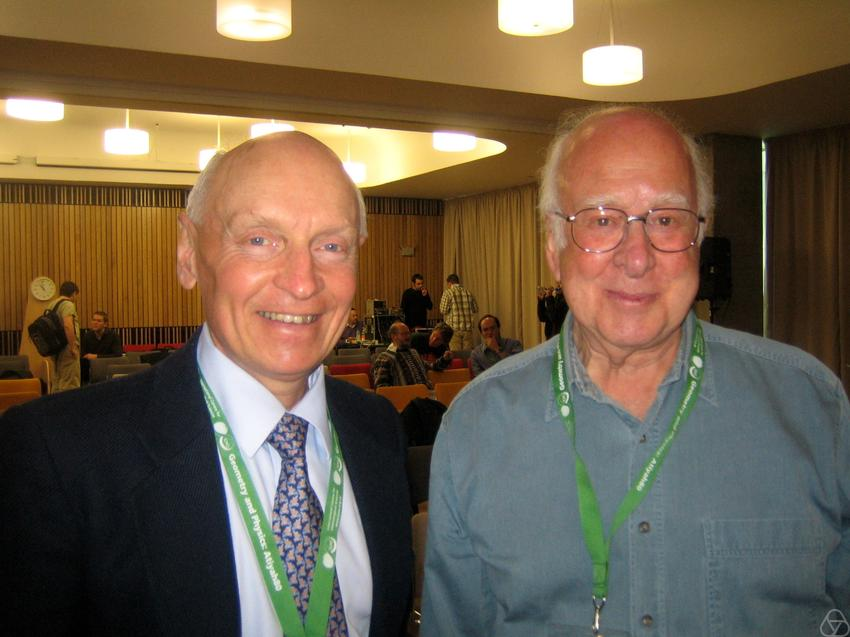
- David Wallace (left) and Peter Higgs

6th Master of Churchill College, Cambridge
- In office 2006–2014
- Preceded by: John Boyd
- Succeeded by: Athene Donald

Personal details
- Born: David James Wallace; 7 October 1945 (age 81)
- Spouse: Elizabeth Anne Yeats (m. 1970)
- Awards: Deputy Lieutenant; Harkness Fellowship
- Scientific career
- Education: Hawick High School
- Alma mater: University of Edinburgh (BSc, PhD)
- Workplaces: University of Cambridge; Princeton University; University of Southampton; Loughborough University; University of Edinburgh; Edinburgh Parallel Computing Centre; Harrow School; Institute of Physics
- Thesis: Applications of current algebras and chiral symmetry breaking (1971)
- Doctoral advisor: Peter Higgs
- Doctoral students: Christopher Bishop; Neil Gunther

Sir David James Wallace (born 7 October 1945) is a British physicist and academic. He served as Vice-Chancellor of Loughborough University from 1994 to 2005, and as Master of Churchill College, Cambridge from 2006 to 2014.

== Early life and education ==
Wallace was born on 7 October 1945. He was educated at Hawick High School in Hawick, Scotland and went to the University of Edinburgh where he earned a degree in Mathematical Physics and a PhD in Elementary particle theory, under the supervision of Peter Higgs.

== Career ==
After postdoctoral research work as a Harkness Fellow at Princeton University, Wallace became a physics lecturer at the University of Southampton in 1972.

In 1979 he became the fourth Tait Professor of Mathematical Physics at the University of Edinburgh, succeeding Nicholas Kemmer. He won the James Clerk Maxwell Medal and Prize in 1980. He became director of the Edinburgh Parallel Computing Centre (EPCC) and in 1996 he was appointed a Commander of the Order of the British Empire (CBE) for his computing work.

Wallace was vice-president for physical sciences (later Physical Sciences & Engineering) of the Royal Society of Edinburgh (2013-2017), of which he was made a Fellow of in 1982. He was formerly vice-president and treasurer of the Royal Society and chair of the Council for the Mathematical Sciences. From 1994 to January 2006 he was the vice-chancellor of Loughborough University. From 2006 to 2011 he served as director of the Isaac Newton Institute for Mathematical Sciences in Cambridge. Wallace has also been president of the Institute of Physics and Deputy Lieutenant of Leicestershire. He was elected a Fellow of the Royal Academy of Engineering (FREng) in 1998, and was a commissioner of the Royal Commission for the Exhibition of 1851 from 2001 to 2011.

In 2014, the Department of Mathematical Sciences at Loughborough University launched a series of public lectures honouring Wallace. The Sir David Wallace lectures are hosted by the university. Speakers have included Cédric Villani and Michael Berry.

== Personal life ==
Wallace married Elizabeth Yeats in 1970 and has a daughter, Sara.

Academic offices
Preceded by Sir David Davies	Vice-Chancellor of Loughborough University; 1994–2005	Succeeded by Dame Shirley Pearce
Preceded by Sir John Kingman	Director of Isaac Newton Institute for Mathematical Sciences; 2006–2011	Succeeded by John Toland
Preceded by Sir John Boyd	Master of Churchill College; 2006–2014	Succeeded by Dame Athene Donald
