= John Burnaby (diplomat) =

British diplomat (1701–1774)

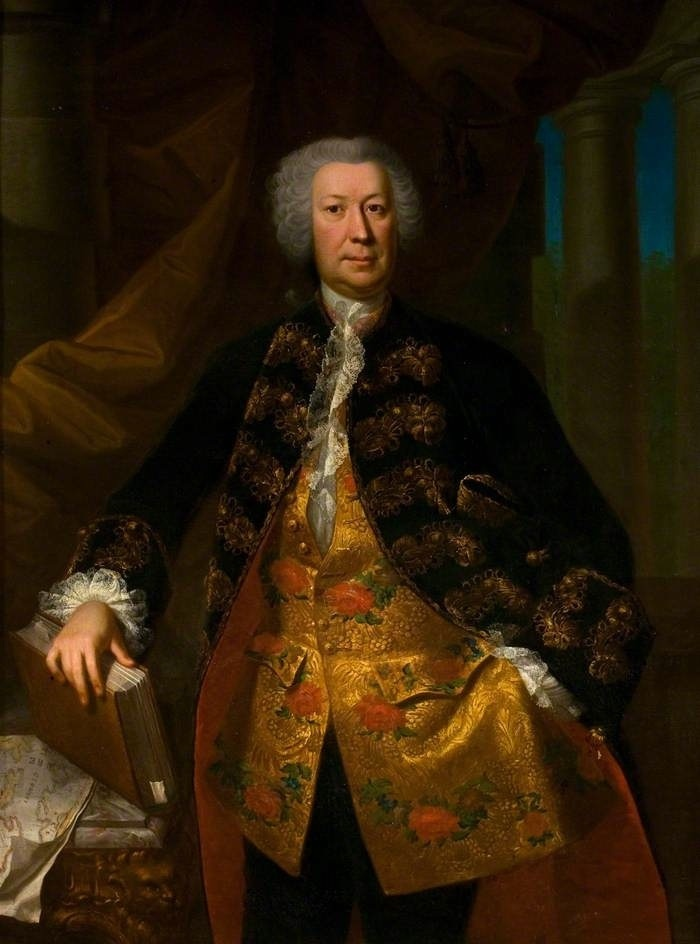
Portrait by Jakob Emanuel Handmann (1748), Leicester Museum & Art Gallery

John Burnaby (1701–1774) was a British diplomat. He was Resident minister to the Swiss cantons.

== Biography ==
Burnaby was the son of John Burnaby, of Kensington, and his wife Clara Wood. His brother was Sir William Burnaby, 1st Baronet. He served as secretary to James Waldegrave, 1st Earl Waldegrave as Ambassador to Austria and then in France. He was recalled from Stockholm in 1741 and sent to Bern in 1743, where he served as Resident minister to the Swiss cantons until 1750. The ferry Reichenbach-Engehalbinsel was established for Burnaby, who had rented Reichenbach Castle in Zollikofen as his summer residence in 1743. In December 1749, the Bernese authorities presented Burnaby with a golden chain with a Sechzehnerpfennig (coin) as a thank you for his services.

Burnaby's daughter Maria had a relationship with the Bernese cloth merchant Daniel Zeerleder (1731-1793). They had a son together, Johann Daniel Zeerleder (1765-1774).

In a memorandum with the subject Traduction des Loix de Berne, Burnaby mentions that he had procured an enclosed manuscript with great difficulty and that it would be useful to have it translated for future Ministers. The manuscript had never appeared in print, did not yet exist as a copy in England and could not be acquired in Bern. The manuscript mentioned is either a copy of the Rotes Buch or the Burgerspunkten. Both were the fundamental laws of the Republic of Bern and never appeared in print during the Ancien Régime.

Burnaby died in September 1774.

== Documents ==
- Burnaby to the Duke of Newcastle, Berne, 4.4.1747, Swiss Federal Archives, P London 10
- Sammlung von Bündnissen der Alten Eidgenossenschaft sowie von Bündnissen und Burgrechten mit der Stadt Bern, Bern (?), um 1616 (mit Zusätzen 17. Jh.), Cologny, Fondation Martin Bodmer, Cod. Bodmer 54
- John Burnaby, Letter book, English and French, eighteenth century, St John's College W.118
- Letter by John Burnaby to the City Council of Fribourg, sine dato, Mss.Mül.531 (13), in the catalogue of Burgerbibliothek Bern
- Correspondence to Fribourg, 18th century, FA von Fellenberg 167.29 (20), in the catalogue of Burgerbibliothek Bern

== Sources ==
- John Debrett: Debrett's Baronetage of England. With Alphabetical Lists of Such Baronetcies as Have Merged in the Peerage, Or Have Become Extinct, and Also of the Existing Baronets of Nova Scotia and Ireland. 1835
- Thomas Freivogel: Emanuel Handmann 1718–1781 – Ein Basler Porträtist im Bern des ausgehenden Rokoko. Murten 2002.
- Matthäus Michel: Fährgeschichten. Fähren auf der Aare um Bremgarten bei Bern. In: Historischer Kalender oder der Hinkende Bot auf das Schaltjahr 2008. Bern 2007, p. 59–61
- H.L. Rabino Di Borgomale: Les armoiries des représentants diplomatiques britanniques en Suisse de 1617 à 1947. In: Schweizerisches Archiv für Heraldik. vol. 61, 1947, p. 49–56.
- J. Sterchi: Berner Chronik von 1701–1761. In: Blätter für bernische Geschichte, Kunst und Altertumskunde. Band 9, Heft 4, 1913, p. 229–275.
- Hans Utz: Liberty and Property. England im 18. Jahrhundert nach Berichten von Bernern. In: Berner Zeitschrift für Geschichte und Heimatkunde. vol. 54, 1992, p. 97–150

Diplomatic posts
Preceded by Luke Schaub	British envoy to Switzerland; 1743–1750	Succeeded by Arthur Villettes
