= What to Eat Now =

- Genre: Cooking documentary
- Presented by: Valentine Warner
- Country of origin: United Kingdom
- Original language: English
- No. of series: 2
- No. of episodes: 12

Production
- Producer: Paul Ratcliffe
- Running time: 30 minutes
- Production company: Optomen TV

Original release
- Network: BBC Two
- Release: 15 September 2008 – 10 August 2009

What to Eat Now is a six-part series, broadcast on BBC Two and presented by chef Valentine Warner. The basic message behind the series is that people should eat food that is in season. The programme was first broadcast on 15 September 2008. A second and final series was broadcast in 2009.

The series has covered autumnal foods, both meats such as rabbit and pigeon, and fruits and vegetables and fungi, including apples, pears, pumpkins, chicory, beetroot and truffle as part of the series. In looking at apples, the show visited Benedictine monks, and talked about how they could find the best apples to make a dish called "apple charlotte". In looking at beetroot, the show visited a farmer who practiced biodynamic farming, believing that the phases of the moon could affect plant growth.

The show travelled to Lindisfarne to illustrate mussel catching. Warner has also published two books entitled "What to Eat Now" and "What to Eat Now – More Please!" to accompany the series'.

== Reception ==
The Guardian commented "do we need a return to the ways of the caveman? Is Valentine Warner the future of TV chefs?" in their review of the series.

== Books ==
Valentine Warner has written two books to accompany the series – What to Eat Now and What to Eat Now – More Please! published by Mitchell Beazley

== DVD ==
A DVD of the first series is now available, distributed by Acorn Media UK.

== See also ==
- Seasonal food
