= Paul Madden (diplomat) =

British diplomat (born 1959)

Paul Madden CMG FRGS
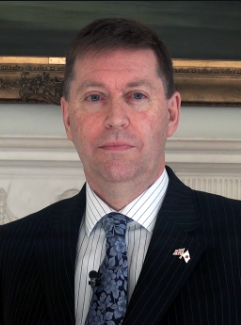

British Ambassador to Japan
- In office January 2017 – February 2021
- Monarch: Elizabeth II
- Prime Minister: Theresa May; Boris Johnson
- Preceded by: Sir Tim Hitchens
- Succeeded by: Julia Longbottom

British High Commissioner to Australia
- In office 2011–2015
- Monarch: Elizabeth II
- Prime Minister: David Cameron
- Preceded by: Baroness Amos
- Succeeded by: Menna Rawlings

British High Commissioner to Singapore
- In office 2007–2011
- Monarch: Elizabeth II
- Prime Minister: Tony Blair; Gordon Brown; David Cameron
- Preceded by: Sir Alan Collins
- Succeeded by: Antony Phillipson

Personal details
- Born: 25 April 1959 (age 67) Devon, England
- Spouse: Sarah
- Children: 3
- Education: University of Cambridge; Durham University; SOAS

Paul Damian Madden CMG FRGS (born 25 April 1959) is a retired British diplomat, who was High Commissioner to Singapore and to Australia, and Ambassador to Japan between 2017 and 2021.

== Education ==
Madden was educated at The King's School, Ottery St Mary, and Gonville and Caius College, Cambridge, where he gained a BA degree in economic geography (later upgraded to MA). He has a Master of Business Administration degree from Durham University. He is a Fellow of the Royal Geographical Society.

In 1983, Madden entered an essay contest sponsored by the Japanese Ministry of Foreign Affairs and was granted a study tour in Japan. He learned Japanese at the University of London, School of Oriental and African Studies (SOAS) and the British Embassy's school in Kamakura.

== Career ==
Madden began his career in the Department of Trade and Industry where he was Private Secretary to the Minister 1984–86. He then studied Japanese at the School of Oriental and African Studies, University of London, and at Kamakura, Kanagawa, Japan, before joining the Diplomatic Service. He served at the Embassy in Tokyo 1988–92, at the Foreign and Commonwealth Office (FCO), dealing with EU enlargement and Environmental issues, 1992–96, and at the Embassy in Washington, D.C. 1996–2000. He was Deputy High Commissioner in Singapore 2000–03, assistant director of Information at the FCO 2003–04, and managing director at UK Trade & Investment 2004–06. He was British High Commissioner in Singapore 2007–11 and High Commissioner to Australia 2011–15.

Madden was appointed Companion of the Order of St Michael and St George (CMG) in the 2013 Birthday Honours, for services to the UK and improving UK-Australian relations.

In April 2016, Madden was appointed British Ambassador to Japan in succession to Tim Hitchens. He took up his appointment in January 2017 as planned.

=== As ambassador to Japan ===
British Ambassador to Japan Presentation Ceremony Bar at the Imperial Palace in Japan

On 18 January 2017, Madden completed the Ceremony of the Presentation of Credentials which was held at Tokyo Imperial Palace.

Madden represented UK-Japan relations during a period in which the two countries had £32 billion in bilateral yearly trade. He oversaw regular visits to Japan by the Royal Navy during a period of increased tensions with China and North Korea. He also supported the creation of the UK-Japan Comprehensive Economic Partnership Agreement in the aftermath of Britain's departure from the European Union and successfully lobbied the Japanese government to support the UK's application to join the Comprehensive and Progressive Agreement for Trans-Pacific Partnership.

On 6 August 2017, Madden attended the Hiroshima Peace Memorial Ceremony held in Hiroshima City.

In 2019, Madden accompanied the Prince of Wales to the enthronement of Emperor Naruhito and attended the 2019 Rugby World Cup, which was hosted by Japan.

In February 2020, SARS-CoV-2 reached Japan on board the Japanese-built, British-registered Diamond Princess cruise ship. Madden worked with Japanese authorities to arrange evacuation from the ship.

Madden retired in March 2021 and was replaced as Ambassador to Japan by Julia Longbottom.

== Bibliography ==
=== Books ===
- Madden, Paul (2003). Raffles: Lessons in Business Leadership. Singapore: WhosWho Publishing.

=== Plays ===
Madden wrote a play, Alternate Serve, that was performed at the Sydney Short and Sweet Theatre Festival, on 28 January 2015.

=== Book reviews ===
Date	Review article	Work(s) reviewed
April 2013	Madden, Paul (April 2013). "Raffles' prize". Australian Book Review. 350: 46.	Glendinning, Victoria (2012). Raffles and the golden opportunity, 1781–1826. London: Profile Books.

Diplomatic posts
Preceded by Sir Alan Collins	British High Commissioner to Singapore; 2007–2011	Succeeded by Antony Phillipson
Preceded by The Baroness Amos	British High Commissioner to Australia; 2011–2015	Succeeded by Menna Rawlings
Preceded by Tim Hitchens	British Ambassador to Japan; 2017–2021	Succeeded by Julia Longbottom
