= List of ambassadors of the United Kingdom to Switzerland =

The ambassador of the United Kingdom to Switzerland is the United Kingdom's foremost diplomatic representative to the Swiss Confederation, and head of the UK's diplomatic mission in Switzerland. The formal title of the post is His [Britannic] Majesty's Ambassador to the Swiss Confederation but it is usually called, even officially, simply His [Britannic] Majesty's Ambassador to Switzerland.

The British ambassador to Switzerland is also non-resident ambassador to the Principality of Liechtenstein.

== List of heads of mission ==
=== Envoys extraordinary ===
- 1689–1692: Thomas Coxe
- 1689–1702: Philibert de Hervart, baron van Hüningen (to the Republic of Geneva only 1689–1692)
- 1702–1705: William Aglionby extraordinary envoy
- 1705–1714: Abraham Stanyan (also to the Grisons 1707–1714)
- 1710 and 1715–1717: James Dayrolle Resident at Geneva
- 1716–1722: Francis Manning (also Secretary to the Grisons at Coire 1709–1713)

=== Ministers plenipotentiary to the Swiss Cantons ===
- 1717–1762: Armand Louis de St. George, Comte de Marsay Minster at Geneva 1717-34; Minister Resident to the Helvetic Republic and the Grisons Leagues 1734–1739; Minster at Geneva 1739–1762
- 1738–1743: Sir Luke Schaub (a diplomat)
- 1743–1749: John Burnaby Minister
- 1743–1750: Jerome de Salis Envoy Extraordinary to the Grisons Leagues
- 1750–1762: Arthur Villettes Minister
- 1762–1765: Robert Colebrooke Minister
- 1763–1765: James, Count of Pictet Minister to the Republic of Geneva
- 1765–1783: William Norton (but absent 1769–1776)
  - 1769–1776: Jean Gabriel Catt Chargé d'Affaires
  - 1772–1774: Isaac Pictet Chargé d'Affaires at Geneva
  - 1777–1792: Louis Braun Chargé d'Affaires
- 1792–1795: Lord Robert Stephen FitzGerald
- 1795–1797: William Wickham also Special Mission 1794–1795
- 1797: James Talbot Chargé d'Affaires
- 1797–1814: No diplomatic relations

=== Envoys extraordinary and ministers plenipotentiary to the Confederated Swiss Cantons ===
- 1814–1820: Stratford Canning
- 1820–1822: William Cromwell Disbrowe Chargé d'Affaires
- 1822–1823: Henry Watkin Williams-Wynn

=== Ministers plenipotentiary to the Confederated States of the Swiss Cantons ===
- 1823–1825: Charles Richard Vaughan
- 1825–1832: Hon. Algernon Percy
- 1832–1847: David Richard Morier
  - 1847: Gilbert Elliot-Murray-Kynynmound, 2nd Earl of Minto Special Mission
  - 1847–1848: Sir Stratford CanningSpecial Mission
- 1848–1849: Henry Wellesley, 1st Baron Cowley

=== Swiss Confederation ===
==== Ministers plenipotentiary ====
- 1849–1851: Sir Edmund Lyons, 1st Bt
- 1851–1852: Arthur Charles Magenis
- 1852–1853: Andrew Buchanan
- 1853–1854: Hon. Charles Murray
- 1854–1858: George John Robert Gordon
- 1858–1867: Hon. Edward Harris

==== Envoys extraordinary and ministers plenipotentiary ====
- 1867–1868: John Lumley-Savile
- 1868–1874: Alfred Guthrie Graham Bonar

==== Resident ministers ====
- 1874–1878: Edwin Corbett
- 1878–1879: Sir Horace Rumbold, 8th Bt
- 1879–1881: Hon. Hussey Crespigny Vivian

==== Envoys extraordinary and ministers plenipotentiary ====
- Mar – Jul 1881: Hon. Hussey Vivian
- 1881–1888: Francis Adams
- 1888–1893: Charles Scott
- 1893–1901: Frederick St John
- 1901–1905: Sir Conyngham Greene
- 1905–1909: Sir George Bonham, 2nd Baronet
- 1909–1911: Henry Bax-Ironside
- 1911–1913: Esme Howard
- 1913–1916: Evelyn Grant Duff
- 1916–1919: Sir Horace Rumbold, 9th Baronet
- 1919–1922: Hon. Odo Russell
- 1922–1924: Sir Milne Cheetham
- 1924–1928: Rowland Sperling
- 1928–1931: Sir Claud Russell
- 1931–1935: Sir Howard Kennard
- 1935–1940: Sir George Warner
- 1940–1942: David Kelly
- 1942–1946: Sir Clifford Norton
- 1946–1950: Thomas Snow
- 1950–1953: Sir Patrick Scrivener

==== Ambassadors extraordinary and plenipotentiary ====
- May–Dec 1953: Sir Patrick Scrivener
- 1953–1958: Sir Lionel Lamb
- 1958–1960: Sir William Montagu-Pollock
- 1960–1964: Sir Paul Grey
- 1964–1968: Sir Robert Isaacson
- 1968–1970: Henry Hohler
- 1970–1973: Eric Midgley
- 1973–1976: Sir John Wraight
- 1976–1980: Sir Alan Rothnie
- 1980–1982: Sir Sydney Giffard
- 1982–1984: John Powell-Jones
- 1984–1988: John Rich
- 1988–1992: Christopher Long
- 1992–1997: David Beattie
- 1997–2001: Christopher Hulse
- 2001–2004: Basil Eastwood
- 2004–2008: Simon Featherstone
- 2008-2008: John Nichols
- 2009–2013: Sarah Gillett
- 2014–2017: David Moran
- 2017–2023: Jane Owen
- 2023–2026: James Squire
- 2026-present: Olivia Ricketts
