= Liechtenstein–United Kingdom relations =

- Liechtenstein: United Kingdom

Diplomatic mission
- Embassy of the United Kingdom, Bern: Embassy of Switzerland, London

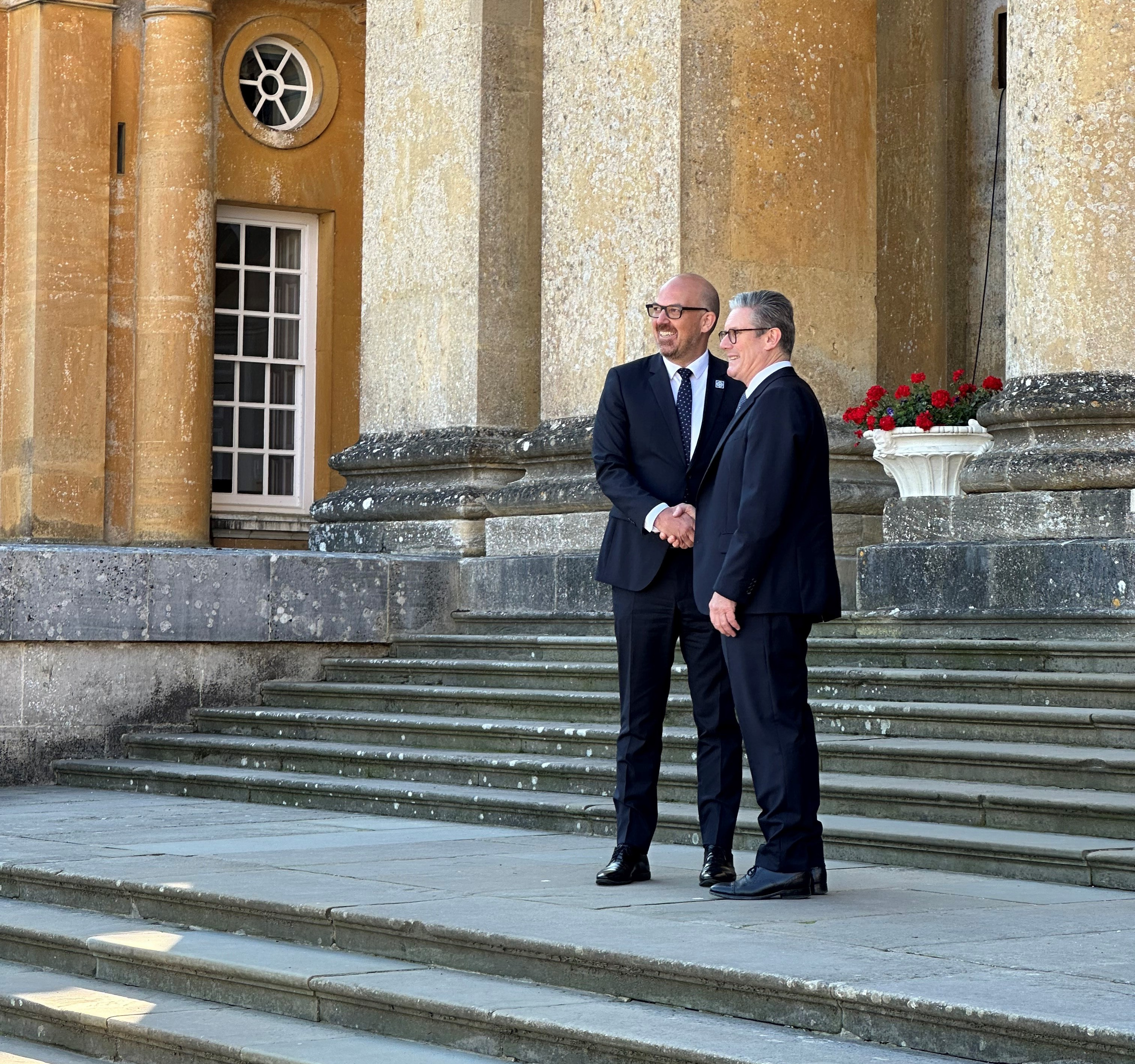
Liechtensteiner Prime Minister Daniel Risch with British Prime Minister Keir Starmer at a European Political Community summit on Blenheim Palace, July 2025.

Liechtensteiner–United Kingdom relations are the bilateral relations of Liechtenstein and the United Kingdom, originating back to World War I. Both countries established diplomatic relations in May 1992. Since then, the relations between the two countries have been stable.

The United Kingdom does not have an embassy in Liechtenstein, but the British ambassador to Switzerland, located in Bern, is also accredited to Liechtenstein. Similarly, the Swiss embassy in London also represents Liechtenstein.

== History ==
Diplomatic relations between the United Kingdom and Liechtenstein date back to World War I. The United Kingdom sided with the Entente countries throughout the war. Though Liechtenstein remained neutral throughout the conflict, it retained close ties to Austria-Hungary and was sympathetic to the Central Powers. At the outbreak of the war, the United Kingdom interned Liechtensteiners and partially confiscated their assets. From 1916, Liechtenstein was embargoed by the Entente countries until the end of the war.

Liechtenstein applied to join the League of Nations in 1920, though this was rejected by the League of Nations Assembly on 17 December 1920, of which the United Kingdom was a member, by a vote of 28 against and 1 in favour. During World War II, Liechtenstein remained neutral, and its neutrality was not violated by any of the combatants. The United Kingdom had been on the side of the Allies since 1939. Though this neutrality was respected by the United Kingdom throughout the war, Liechtensteiner organizations such as Marxer & Partner Rechtsanwälte were embargoed from 1943 due to its cooperation with individuals associated with the war industry of Nazi Germany.

During the 2008 Liechtenstein tax affair, it was revealed that secret bank information had also been sold to British tax authorities, which led to 100 British citizens being investigated for tax evasion. Liechtenstein reached an agreement with the United Kingdom in 2009 that will allow the about 5,000 British customers of Liechtenstein's banks that hold for them about £2-3 billion in secret accounts to come clear with British tax authorities under terms of a significantly reduced penalty.

Both countries were members of the European Economic Area until the United Kingdom's departure on 31 January 2020. On 8 July 2021, Liechtenstein and the United Kingdom signed a free trade agreement in conjunction with members of the European Free Trade Association.

== See also ==
- Foreign relations of Liechtenstein
- Foreign relations of the United Kingdom
- Free trade agreements of the United Kingdom
- Switzerland–Liechtenstein–United Kingdom Trade Agreement
