= David Williams (British legal scholar) =

Welsh barrister and legal scholar

Sir David Williams QC DL

Vice-Chancellor of the University of Cambridge
- In office 1989 to 1996
- Chancellor: The Duke of Edinburgh
- Preceded by: Michael McCrum
- Succeeded by: Alec Broers

Personal details
- Born: 22 October 1930 Carmarthen, Carmarthenshire, Wales
- Died: 6 September 2009 (aged 78)
- Education: Queen Elizabeth Grammar School, Carmarthen; Emmanuel College, Cambridge

Sir David Glyndwr Tudor Williams, QC, DL (22 October 1930 – 6 September 2009) was a Welsh barrister and legal scholar. He was president of Wolfson College, Cambridge from 1980 to 1992. He was also vice-chancellor of the University of Cambridge: on a part-time basis from 1989 to 1992, and then as the first full-time vice-chancellor from 1992 to 1996.

== Early life and education ==
Williams was educated at Queen Elizabeth Grammar School, Carmarthen. From 1949 to 1950, he undertook national service with the Royal Air Force. In 1950, he matriculated into Emmanuel College, Cambridge to study history and law. He graduated from the University of Cambridge with a first class Bachelor of Arts (BA) degree in 1954.

== Academic career ==
He was a Harkness Fellow at Berkeley and Harvard between 1956 and 1958. He moved to Emmanuel College, Cambridge, from Keble College, Oxford in 1967 and was subsequently promoted to reader in public law 1976–1980, before being appointed Rouse Ball Professor of English Law 1983–1992 and elected president of Wolfson College, Cambridge 1980–1992.

In 1989 he was appointed the first full-time vice-chancellor of the University of Cambridge and was a member of the Nuffield Council on Bioethics from 1991 to 1994. In 2007 he was appointed as the chancellor of Swansea University.

Williams had been awarded honorary degrees by a dozen institutions, including an honorary LLD from the University of Cambridge and a Doctor of Civil Law from the University of Western Ontario.

Williams died from cancer on 6 September 2009 at the age of 78.

In 2016, the University of Cambridge Faculty of Law named its building and a Chair in Public Law after him.

Academic offices
Preceded by John Morrison	President of Wolfson College, Cambridge; 1980–1992	Succeeded by John Tusa
Preceded by Michael McCrum	Vice-Chancellor of the University of Cambridge; 1989–1996	Succeeded by Alec Broers
