= Michael Wilford (diplomat) =

British diplomat

Sir Michael Wilford

British Ambassador to Japan
- In office 1975–1980
- Monarch: Elizabeth II
- Prime Minister: Harold Wilson; James Callaghan; Margaret Thatcher
- Preceded by: Sir Frederick Warner
- Succeeded by: Sir Hugh Cortazzi

Personal details
- Born: 31 January 1922 Wellington, New Zealand
- Died: 28 June 2006 (aged 84)
- Spouse: Joan Law (m. 1944)
- Children: 3
- Education: Wrekin College
- Alma mater: Pembroke College, Cambridge

Sir Kenneth Michael Wilford GCMG (31 January 1922 – 28 June 2006) was a British diplomat. He served as the British Ambassador to Japan from 1975 to 1980.

== Early life ==
Wilford was born in Wellington, New Zealand on 31 January 1922, where his father was working as an engineer. After his parents separated, he moved to Dublin where he attended Castle Park Prep School. Returning to England, he was educated at Wrekin College in Wellington, Shropshire. He read mechanical sciences at Pembroke College, Cambridge, playing for the university at both golf and cricket, before his studies were interrupted in 1940. Called up for military service, he joined the Royal Engineers and became a captain, taking part in the Normandy landings as a member of the Guards Armoured Division. At the end of the war he returned to the University of Cambridge to complete his degree.

== Career ==
Wilford joined the Foreign Service in 1947. His first posting was at the commission in Berlin in 1947. He worked in Singapore from 1955 to 1959, where he began to develop an interest in East Asian politics and economics.

Wilford spent part of his career working in the private offices of five Foreign Secretaries, including Selwyn Lloyd from 1959 to 1960. After working as private secretary to Edward Heath, then Lord Privy Seal, he was posted to Rabat in 1962, followed by Beijing, Hong Kong and Washington.

In 1975 he became the British Ambassador to Japan, a role in which he served until his retirement in 1980.

== Personal life ==
In 1944, Wilford married Joan Law, a wireless operator at the Women's Royal Naval Service. They had three daughters.

Wilford played golf as a hobby. He died on 28 June 2006, aged 84.

== Honours ==
Wilford was appointed a Companion of the Order of St Michael & St George (CMG) in the 1967 New Year Honours. He was promoted to Knight Commander of the Order (KCMG) in the 1976 New Year Honours, and to Knight Grand Cross of the Order (GCMG) in the 1980 Birthday Honours.

Diplomatic posts
Preceded by Sir Frederick Warner	British Ambassador to Japan; 1975–1980	Succeeded by Sir Hugh Cortazzi
