= Sydney Giffard =

British diplomat (1926–2020)

Sir Sydney Giffard KCMG

British Ambassador to Japan
- In office 1984–1986
- Monarch: Elizabeth II
- Prime Minister: Margaret Thatcher
- Preceded by: Sir Hugh Cortazzi
- Succeeded by: Sir John Whitehead

British Ambassador to Switzerland
- In office 1980–1982
- Monarch: Elizabeth II
- Prime Minister: Margaret Thatcher
- Preceded by: Sir Alan Rothnie
- Succeeded by: John Ernest Powell-Jones

Personal details
- Born: 30 October 1926
- Died: 21 February 2020 (aged 93)
- Education: Repton School
- Alma mater: Wadham College, Oxford

Sir Charles Sydney Rycroft Giffard KCMG (30 October 1926 – 21 February 2020) was a British diplomat and author. He was educated at Repton School and read classics at Wadham College, Oxford University. His career in the foreign service began in 1961. He became the British Ambassador to Switzerland from 1980. He returned to London as Deputy Under Secretary of State of the Foreign and Commonwealth Office from 1982 to 1984. From 1984 to 1986, he was Ambassador from the United Kingdom to Japan. In 1983 he received the Order of St Michael and St George and in 2003, the Order of the Rising Sun. In a statistical overview derived from writings by and about Giffard, OCLC/WorldCat encompasses roughly 8 works in 15 publications in 1 language and 1,120 library holdings.

== Bibliography ==
- Ai no Shogen (The Flowers are fallen) by Rinzō Shiina, 1961, translated from the Japanese by Giffard
- Japan among the powers 1880–1990, 1994
- Guns, kites and horses: three diaries from the Western front, 2003

Diplomatic posts
Preceded by Sir Alan Rothnie	British Ambassador to Switzerland; 1980–1982	Succeeded by John Ernest Powell-Jones
Preceded by Sir Hugh Cortazzi	British Ambassador to Japan; 1984–1986	Succeeded by Sir John Whitehead
