= Frederick Warner (diplomat) =

British diplomat and businessman

Sir Frederick Warner GCVO KCMG
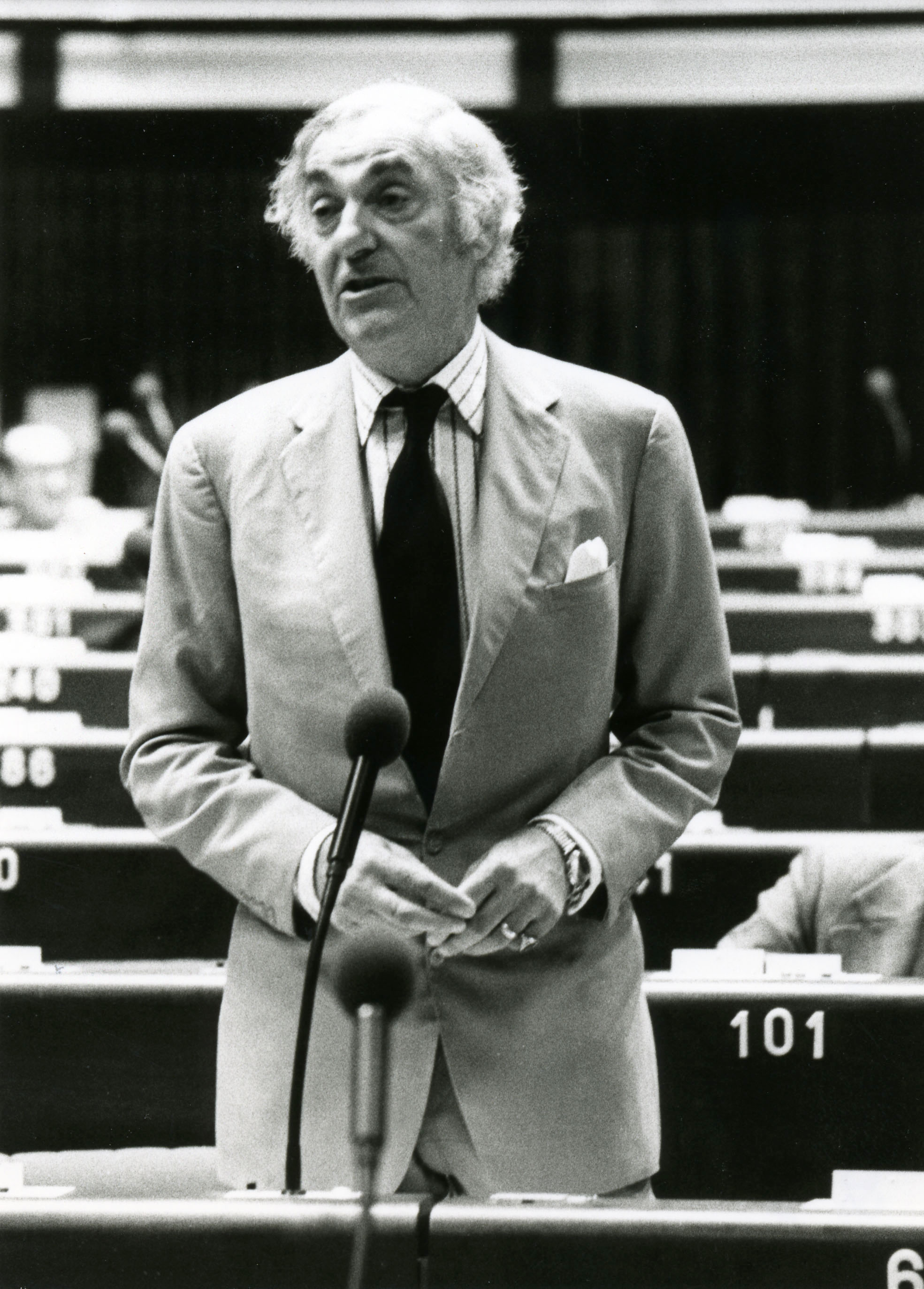
- Warner in the European Parliament in 1980

British Ambassador to Japan
- In office 1972–1975
- Monarch: Elizabeth II
- Prime Minister: Edward Heath; Harold Wilson
- Preceded by: Sir John Arthur Pilcher
- Succeeded by: Sir Michael Wilford

Personal details
- Born: 2 May 1918
- Died: 30 September 1995 (aged 77)
- Children: 2, including Valentine
- Education: Wixenford School; Britannia Royal Naval College
- Alma mater: Magdalen College, Oxford; University of Sheffield

Sir Frederick Archibald Warner GCVO KCMG (2 May 1918 – 30 September 1995) was a British diplomat and businessman. At the end of his career he was a Conservative Party politician, serving as a Member of the European Parliament (MEP) from 1979 to 1984.

== Education ==
Warner was educated at Wixenford School, Wokingham, and the Royal Naval College, Dartmouth. He then went to Magdalen College, Oxford, and also studied at the University of Sheffield.

== Diplomatic service ==
After service in the Royal Navy during the Second World War, Warner joined the Foreign Office in February 1946 as an Assistant Principal. Within a few months he had transferred to the Diplomatic Service as a Second Secretary. In 1950 Warner was promoted to First Secretary and posted to the British Embassy in Moscow.

Warner returned to a London posting at the end of 1951. He was working in the private office of Hector McNeil with Guy Burgess at the time of Burgess' defection to the Soviet Union; Burgess' wayward behaviour at the time later led to accusations that Warner should have raised concerns about him. These accusations stalled Warner's career briefly: he remained in London for five years before in 1956 he was made acting Chargé d'affaires at the embassy in Rangoon, Burma. From 1958 he was transferred to Athens, Greece. In 1960 Warner was made Head of the South-East Asia Department of the Foreign Office.

== Advancement ==
From 1964 to 1965, Warner was transferred to the Imperial Defence College where he learned more about the relationship between defence and foreign policy. He was made Ambassador to Laos from 1965 to 1967, and then served as Minister to NATO throughout 1968. A brief return to London as Under-Secretary of State at the (newly merged) Foreign and Commonwealth Office in 1969 was followed by the role of Ambassador and Deputy Permanent United Kingdom Representative to the United Nations.

== Ambassadorship ==
Warner married for the first time in New York City in 1971, Simone Georgina de Ferranti (Née Nangle), who gave him a stepdaughter and two sons of his own, one of whom is TV chef Valentine Warner. At the end of that year he was named as Ambassador to Japan and learned Japanese at the University of Sheffield. He made the arrangements for the visit of Edward Heath to Japan, the first such visit by a sitting British Prime Minister. Despite Warner's unstuffiness (which ruffled some feathers among the Japanese civil servants who expected more formality), he became popular and was awarded the Order of the Rising Sun, 1st Class.

At the end of his posting Warner hoped for a top flight post, conceivably even as Ambassador to Paris or to Washington. He was disappointed when others were named to these posts, and Warner retired from the Diplomatic Service in 1975, reasoning that it would be easier for him to start a second career as early as possible.

== Business career ==
He then went into business, becoming a business consultant and Director of Globalstar Telecommunications Ltd. He later picked up directorships of the Mercantile and General Reinsurance Company Ltd, Chloride Group Ltd, Guinness Peat Group, Loral International Inc., and Vicarello SpA. He settled in Somerset and became Chairman of the Wessex Region of the National Trust from 1976 to 1978.

== European Parliament ==
At the 1979 elections to the European Parliament, Warner was elected as a Conservative MEP for Somerset. He specialised in international affairs, successfully urging the European Commission to help fund Afghan refugees and bemoaning the Iranian government's failure to respect diplomatic immunity in the Iran hostage crisis. He helped draw up the European policy in the Conservative manifesto for the 1983 general election.

Standing down at the 1984 election, Warner co-authored a pamphlet that November calling for the United Kingdom to become a full member of the European Monetary System. He was Chairman of the Overseas Committee of the Confederation of British Industry from 1985 to 1988, and in 1991 published a book titled "Anglo-Japanese Financial Relations".

== Honours ==
Warner was appointed a Companion of the Order of Saint Michael and Saint George (CMG) in the 1963 New Year Honours, and promoted to Knight Commander of the Order (KCMG) in the 1972 Birthday Honours. He was appointed a Knight Grand Cross of the Royal Victorian Order (GCVO) in 1975.

Diplomatic posts
Preceded by Sir Donald Hopson	British Ambassador to Laos; 1965–1967	Succeeded by Sir Harold Smedley
Preceded by Sir John Arthur Pilcher	British Ambassador to Japan; 1972–1975	Succeeded by Sir Michael Wilford
