= John Hutchison (diplomat) =

British diplomat (1890–1965)

Sir John Hutchison KBE
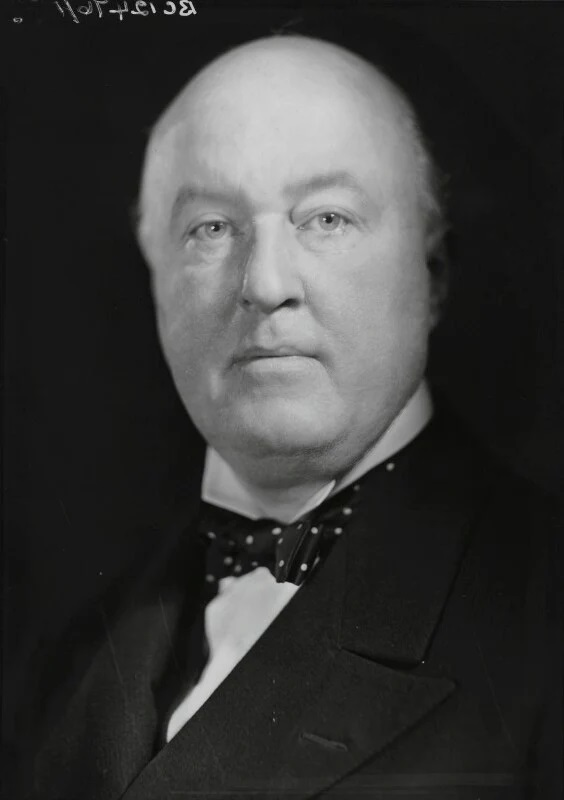

British Chargé d'Affaires to China
- In office 1949–1951
- Preceded by: Sir Ralph Stevenson
- Succeeded by: Sir Lionel Lamb

Personal details
- Born: 16 October 1890
- Died: 11 July 1965 (aged 74) Folkestone, Kent
- Children: 2
- Education: Gonville and Caius College, Cambridge
- Occupation: Diplomat

Sir John Colville Hutchison (16 October 1890 – 11 July 1965) was a British diplomat who served as Chargé d'Affaires to China from 1949 to 1951.

== Early life and education ==
Hutchison was born on 16 October 1890, the son of John Hutchison. He was educated at Malvern College and Gonville and Caius College, Cambridge.

== Career ==
Hutchison joined the Foreign Office in 1915 and went to China as a student interpreter. In 1930, he was appointed commercial secretary at the British Legation in Peking. In 1938, he was transferred to Hong Kong where he held the appointment of British trade commissioner.

In 1940, Hutchison returned to China and served as counsellor (commercial) at the British Embassies in Shanghai, and Peking, and was promoted to minister (commercial) in 1948. In 1949, shortly before Britain recognised the communist regime, he was appointed chargé d’affaires ad interim to the People's Republic of China, and carried out preliminary negotiations with the Peking Government concerning the establishment of diplomatic relations. He remained in the post until his retirement in 1951.

== Personal life and death ==
Hutchison married Dora Winifred Evans in 1919 and they had a son and a daughter.

Hutchison died on 11 July 1965 at Folkestone, Kent, aged 74.

== Honours ==
Hutchison was appointed Officer of the Order of the British Empire (OBE) in the 1928 Birthday Honours, and promoted to Commander of the Order of the British Empire (CBE) in the 1948 New Year Honours, and promoted to Knight Commander of the Order of the British Empire (KBE) in the 1951 New Year Honours.

== See also ==
- China–United Kingdom relations

Diplomatic posts
Preceded by Sir Ralph Stevenson	British Chargé d'Affaires to China; 1949–1951	Succeeded by Sir Lionel Lamb
