= Switzerland–United Kingdom Free Trade Agreement =

Proposed free trade agreement between Switzerland and the United Kingdom

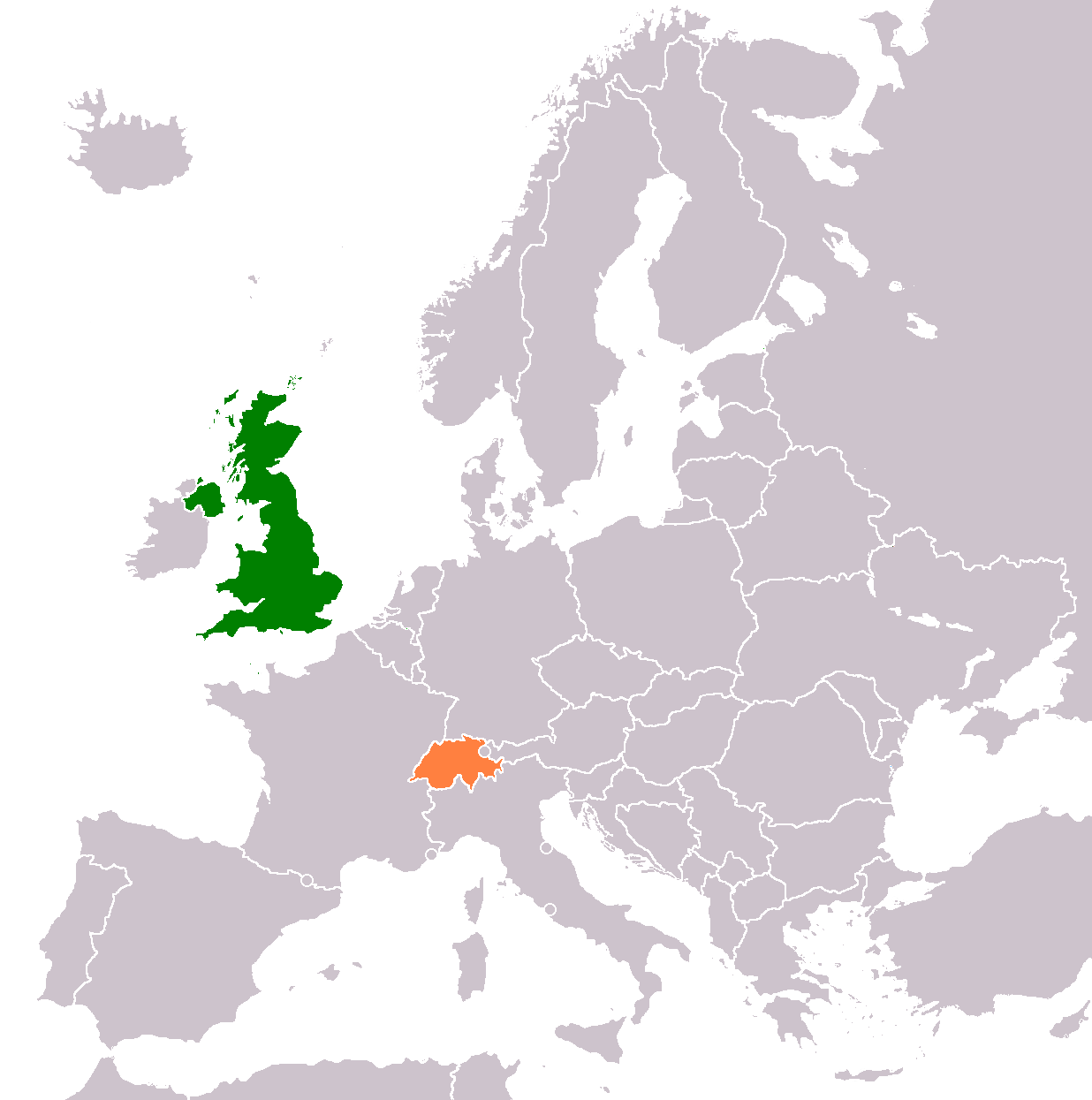
- Switzerland United Kingdom
- Type: Free trade agreement and Economic Integration Agreement
- Context: Enhanced free trade agreement between Switzerland and the United Kingdom
- Drafted: 13 July 2026
- Negotiators: (Switzerland) Swiss Economics Minister: Guy Parmelin; (United Kingdom) British Trade Ministers: Kemi Badenoch (until 5 July 2024); Jonathan Reynolds (until 5 September 2025); Peter Kyle (until 20 July 2026); Jonathan Reynolds (from 20 July 2026)
- Parties: Switzerland; United Kingdom
- Language: English

The Switzerland–United Kingdom free trade agreement (SUKFTA) is a drafted free trade agreement which concluded negotiations on 16 July 2026. The trade agreement will be the third FTA to cover Switzerland–UK trade, superseding the Switzerland–Liechtenstein–UK Trade Agreement, updating the deal to cover services and digital trade. The deal was the sixth free trade agreement that the United Kingdom concluded since withdrawal of the United Kingdom from the European Union. Trade value between Switzerland and the United Kingdom was worth £53,551 million in 2022.

== History ==
From 1 January 1973 until 30 December 2020, trade between Switzerland and the UK was governed by the Switzerland–European Union trade agreements, while the United Kingdom was a member of the European Union. Following the withdrawal of the United Kingdom from the European Union, the UK and Switzerland signed a continuity trade agreement on 11 February 2019, based on the EU trade agreements; the agreement entered into force on 3 May 2021.

== Negotiations ==
Trade negotiations formally opened on 15 May 2023.

Switzerland–United Kingdom FTA Rounds of Negotiations
Round	Dates	Location	Ref.
1	22 May–2 June 2023	London	
2	18 September–6 October 2023	Virtual meeting	
3	27 November–14 December 2023	Virtual meeting	
4	4–8 March 2024	Bern	
5	14–18 October 2024	London	
6	3–10 March 2025	Bern	
7	5–13 June 2025	London	
8	20–24 October 2025	Bern	
9	12–16 January 2026	London	
10	9–13 March 2026	Geneva	

Both sides refused to give a deadline for the conclusion of negotiations; the new agreement that reduces barriers to trade between the two “services superpowers” in areas like finance, legal and professional services, and architecture. The second round of negotiations took place from 18 September to 6 October 2023.

The third round of negotiations took place from 27 November to 14 December. Officials held technical discussions on areas such as procurement, investment, small-medium enterprises, sanitary and phytosanitary measures and animal welfare. The UK is also working with the Swiss to provide long-term certainty and greater market access for UK-Swiss service suppliers, claiming to boost bilateral trade in this area by £23.7 billion. The fourth round of negotiations took place from 4 to 8 March 2024 in Bern.

The sixth round of negotiations took place during March 2025, The round saw progress made in financial services in particular, with both sides focused on agreeing the most comprehensive chapter either country has signed. The two sides discussed digital trade, provisions on data, source code, and cryptography. Several chapters were provisionally closed during this round, including customs and trade facilitation, and transparency.

The seventh round took place during June 2025 in London, both sides made significant progress on services, financial market access, digital trade, and rules of origin for goods. They reached provisional agreements on areas such as dispute settlement, consumer protection, and anti-corruption, while also discussing agricultural market access and protections for geographical indications.

The eighth round took place in October 2025 in Switzerland, the round included the mutual agreement on competition issues between the two countries.

The ninth round took place in January 2026, reached a provisional agreement on environment and labour policy areas, which both sides agreed to combine in a chapter called ‘Trade and Sustainable Development’.

The tenth round of UK-Swiss free-trade agreement negotiations took place in Geneva, where negotiators made progress on services, investment, and digital trade, though outstanding issues remained regarding market access in the services sector, data flows and protection, and certain aspects of intellectual property.

Negotiations for the free trade agreement were concluded on 13 July 2026.

== See also ==
- Switzerland–United Kingdom relations
- Free trade agreements of the United Kingdom
- Foreign relations of Switzerland
- Foreign relations of the United Kingdom
