= John Whitehead (diplomat) =

British diplomat and businessman

Sir John Whitehead GCMG MVO

British Ambassador to Japan
- In office 1986–1992
- Monarch: Elizabeth II
- Prime Minister: Margaret Thatcher; John Major
- Preceded by: Sir Sydney Giffard
- Succeeded by: Sir John Boyd

Personal details
- Born: 20 September 1932
- Died: 8 November 2013 (aged 81)
- Spouse: Carolyn Hilton Whitehead (m. 1964)
- Children: 4
- Education: Christ's Hospital
- Alma mater: Hertford College, Oxford
- Occupation: Diplomat

Sir John Stainton Whitehead GCMG CVO (20 September 1932 – 8 November 2013) was a British diplomat and businessman.

== Career ==
Whitehead was educated at Christ's Hospital and Hertford College, Oxford and joined the British Foreign Service in 1955 after a period of National Service.

He was Ambassador from the United Kingdom to Japan from 1986 until 1992.

After his retirement from the diplomatic service, he was a senior advisor to Deutsche Bank, Tokyo Electric Power Company (TEPCO) and other international companies.

He became Chairman of Deutsche Morgan Grenfell Trust Bank (Japan).

== Honours ==
- Order of St Michael and St George, Knight Commander (KCMG)
- Order of St Michael and St George, Knight Grand Cross (GCMG)
- Royal Victorian Order, Commander (CVO)
- Order of the Rising Sun, Grand Cordon, 2006
- Honorary Fellow of Hertford College, Oxford

Diplomatic posts
Preceded by Sir Sydney Giffard	British Ambassador to Japan; 1986–1992	Succeeded by Sir John Boyd
