= Alec Broers, Baron Broers =

British electrical engineer

The Right Honourable The Lord Broers FRS FMedSci FREng
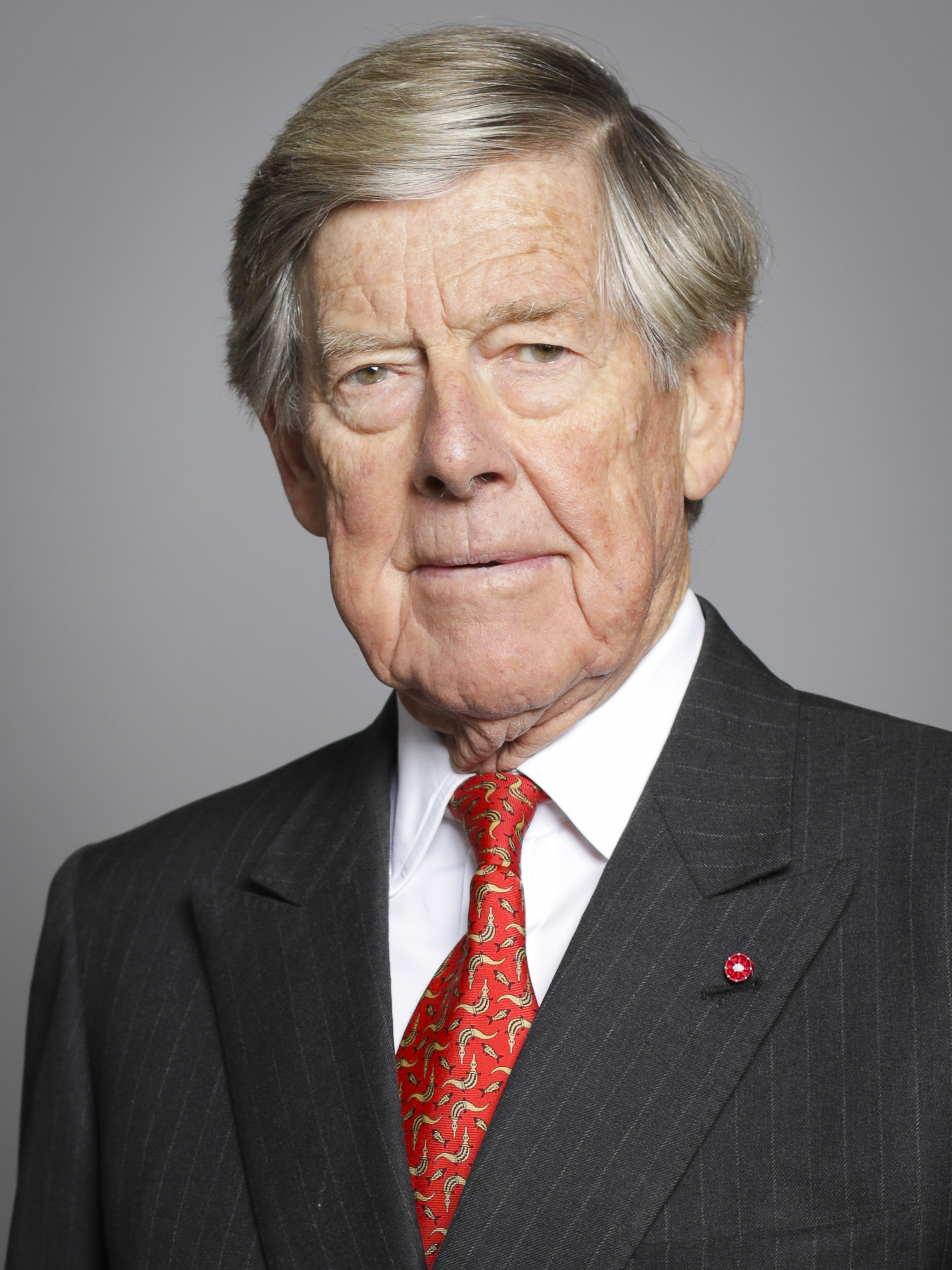

Vice-Chancellor of the University of Cambridge
- In office 1996–2003
- Chancellor: The Duke of Edinburgh
- Preceded by: David Glyndwr Tudor Williams
- Succeeded by: Alison Richard

Member of the House of Lords
- Lord Temporal
- Life peerage 21 June 2004 – 17 December 2021

Personal details
- Born: 17 September 1938 (age 88) Calcutta, British Raj
- Education: Geelong Grammar School; University of Melbourne; University of Cambridge

4th Master of Churchill College, Cambridge
- In office 1990–1996
- Preceded by: Sir Hermann Bondi
- Succeeded by: Sir John Boyd

Alec Nigel Broers, Baron Broers (born 17 September 1938) is a British electrical engineer.

In 1994 Broers was elected an international member of the National Academy of Engineering for contributions to electronic beam lithography and microscopy and for leadership in microfabrication.

== Education and early life ==
Broers was born in Calcutta, India, and educated at Geelong Grammar School, the University of Melbourne in Australia and at Gonville and Caius College, Cambridge, in England.

== Career ==
Broers then worked in the research and development laboratories of IBM in the United States for 19 years before returning to Cambridge in 1984 to become Professor of Electrical Engineering (1984–96) and Fellow of Trinity College, Cambridge (1985–90). He is a pioneer of nanotechnology.

Broers subsequently became Master of Churchill College, Cambridge (1990–1996) and Head of the University of Cambridge Engineering Department (1993–196). He was Vice-Chancellor of the University of Cambridge from 1996 to 2003. In 1997, he was invited to deliver the MacMillan Memorial Lecture to the Institution of Engineers and Shipbuilders in Scotland. He chose the subject "The Role and Education of the Creative Engineer". He was knighted in 1998 and created a crossbench life peer in 2004, as Baron Broers, of Cambridge in the County of Cambridgeshire. Lord Broers was Chairman of the Science and Technology Committee of the House of Lords from 2004 to 2007 and was President of the Royal Academy of Engineering from 2001 to 2006.

In September 2008, Lord Broers took over from Sir David Cooksey as chairman of the board of directors at the Diamond Light Source, the United Kingdom's largest new scientific facility for 45 years.

== Awards and honours ==
Lord Broers has received more than twenty honorary degrees and fellowships from universities, colleges, and academic and professional institutions. He is a Foreign Member of the US National Academy of Engineering, the Chinese Academy of Engineering, the Australian Academy of Technological Sciences and Engineering, and the American Philosophical Society. He was elected Fellow of the Royal Academy of Engineering in 1985. He was elected to the Royal Society in 1986. He was awarded the Prize for Industrial Applications of Physics by the American Institute of Physics in 1982, the Cledo Brunetti Award of the IEEE in 1985, and the Prince Philip Medal of the Royal Academy of Engineering in 2001.

== Career summary ==
- 1959 BSc degree in physics from the University of Melbourne, Australia
- 1962 BA degree in electrical sciences from the University of Cambridge, after arriving initially as a choral scholar
- 1965 PhD degree at University of Cambridge, thesis titled Selective ion beam etching in the scanning electron microscope
- 1965 Researcher at IBM USA, and serving on the Corporate Technical Committee
- 1977 Appointed IBM Fellow by IBM's CEO
- 1984 Returns to the University of Cambridge as Professor of Electrical Engineering and Fellow of Trinity College
- 1990 Master of Churchill College
- 1992 Head of University of Cambridge Engineering Department
- 1994 International member of the National Academy of Engineering
- 1995 Becomes a non-executive director of Lucas Industries
- 1996 Vice Chancellor, University of Cambridge (until 2003)
- 1997 Becomes a non-executive director of Vodafone
- 1998 Knighted for services to education
- 1998 Founded the Cambridge Network with Hermann Hauser and David Cleevely
- 2001 President of the Royal Academy of Engineering
- 2004 Granted a life peerage, becoming Lord Broers
- 2004 Becomes Chairman of the House of Lords Science and Technology Committee
- 2005 Broers presents the Reith Lectures for the BBC
- 2008 Becomes Chairman of Diamond Light Source Ltd
- 2009 Becomes Chairman of Bio Nano Consulting
- 2010 Becomes Chairman of the Technology Strategy Board Knowledge Transfer Network for Transport.
- 2012–2015 Chairman of the Judging Panel of the Queen Elizabeth Prize for Engineering
- 2021 President of the Parliamentary and Scientific Committee

== Research ==
Broers began his research career in the Engineering Department of the University of Cambridge in 1961 working with Professor Charles Oatley, and later with Dr William C Nixon, on the in situ study of surfaces undergoing ion etching in the scanning electron microscope (SEM). The microscope he used had originally been built by Oatley and had then been modified Garry Stewart who had also added an ion source that focussed ions onto the sample surface. Garry Stewart, who was another of Professor Oatley's students, then moved to the Cambridge Instrument Company where he oversaw the design and building of the world's first commercial SEM, the Stereoscan. During his PhD studies, Broers rebuilt the SEM fitting a magnetic final lens in place of the original electrostatic lens thereby improving the microscope's resolution to about 10 nm, and after examining ion etched surfaces, used the microscope's electron beam for the first time to write patterns, subsequently using ion etching to transfer these patterns into gold, tungsten and silicon structures as small as 40 nm. These were the first man-made nanostructures in materials suitable for microelectronic circuits opening up the possibility for the extreme miniaturization of electronic circuits that was to occur in the decades to come.

After graduating from Cambridge, Lord Broers spent nearly 20 years in research and development with IBM in the United States. He worked for sixteen years at the Thomas J Watson Research Centre in New York, then for 3 years at the East Fishkill Development Laboratory, and finally at Corporate Headquarters. His first assignment at the T J Watson Research laboratory was to find a long life electron emitter to replace the tungsten wire filaments used in electron microscopes at the time. IBM had built the first billion bit computer store using an electron beam to write on photographic film and the relatively short lifetime of the tungsten filament sources was not acceptable. To solve this problem he developed the first practical electron guns that used LaB_{6} emitters. These emitters not only solved the lifetime problem, but also provided higher electron brightness than tungsten filaments, and in the late 1960s and early 1970s he built two new SEMs for examining surfaces that took advantage of this and produced higher resolution than previous SEMs (3 nm in the secondary electron surface mode) and then a short focal length instrument with 0.5 nm beam size. He used the second SEM to examine thin samples in the transmission mode and to examine solid samples using the high energy electron scattered from the surface of the sample, the electrons that had been called 'low-loss electrons by Oliver C Wells who had proposed their use in the SEM. Initially this high resolution low-loss mode was used to examine bacteriophage and blood cells in collaboration with researchers at NYU, and at the Veteran's Administration Hospital in New Jersey however, the bulk of his work was devoted to using the microscopes as tools to scribe things using the lithography techniques that were becoming familiar for making silicon chips. He and his colleague Michael Hatzakis used these new electron beam lithography to make the first silicon transistors with micron dimensions. and sub-micron dimensions showing that it would be possible to scale down the dimensions of electron devices well below the dimensions that were being used at the time.

"I had a marvellous time doing research in the IBM research laboratory" he recalls "I had essentially turned my hobby into my career." He remembers having a roomful of electronics and was overjoyed to spend his time building new things and testing them. There he spent around 16 years in research in one of the best 'playhouses for electronics' in the world, building microscopes and equipment for the fabrication of miniature components. In 1977 he was given the enviable position of being an IBM fellow, an honour accorded to, at that time, only around 40 out of IBM's 40,000 engineers and scientists. This gave him the freedom to follow whatever road of enquiry he wished and he continued his work pushing the limits of what was called at the time microfabrication. Over the next ten years he conducted a series of careful experiments measuring the ultimate resolution of electron beam lithography and then used the highest resolution methods to fabricate electronic devices.

One of the deleterious effects that limited resolution was the fogging effect of the electrons backscattered from the bulk of the sample. To avoid this Broers and Sedgwick invented a thin membrane substrate using technologies used to make inkjet printer heads. The membrane was thin enough effectively to eliminate the backscattered electrons. These membrane substrates allowed the first metal structures with dimensions below 10 nm to be fabricated and tested. Because these dimensions were now measured in single nanometers he and his coworkers decided to call these nanostructures and the techniques used to make them nanofabrication rather than use the prefix micro that had been common parlance until then. These membrane samples also found application many years later in MEMs (Micro-Electro-Mechanical) devices, and also as 'cantilevers' in biomedical applications. Early experiments with X-ray lithography also used similar membranes.

When he arrived back in Cambridge, Lord Broers set up a nanofabrication laboratory to extend the technology of miniaturisation to the atomic scale by developing some of the novel fabrication methods that he had discovered at IBM. He modified a 400 kV transmission electron microscope (JEOL 4000EX) so that it operated in a scanning mode and produced a minimum beam size of about 0.3 nm. He used this system working in collaboration with researchers at the IMEC microelectronics research laboratory in Leuven, Belgium, to build some of the smallest and fastest field effect transistors that had ever been built.

He describes his research on nanolithography and electron microscopy in Volume 231 of Advances in Imaging and Electron Physics, 2024.

Academic offices
Preceded by Sir Hermann Bondi	Master of Churchill College; 1990–1996	Succeeded by Sir John Boyd
Preceded by Sir David Williams	Vice-Chancellor of the University of Cambridge; 1996–2003	Succeeded by Dame Alison Richard
Orders of precedence in the United Kingdom
Preceded by The Lord Dykes	Gentlemen; Baron Broers	Followed by The Lord Vallance of Tummel
