= Julia Longbottom =

Ambassador of the United Kingdom to Japan

Her Excellency Julia Longbottom CMG
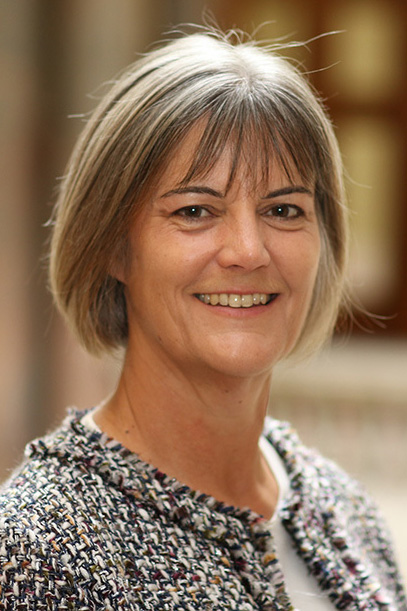

British Ambassador to Japan
- In office March 2021 – August 2026
- Monarchs: Elizabeth II; Charles III
- Prime Minister: Boris Johnson; Liz Truss; Rishi Sunak; Keir Starmer; Andy Burnham
- Preceded by: Paul Madden
- Succeeded by: Corin Robertson

Personal details
- Born: 13 July 1963 (age 63)
- Spouse: Richard Sciver (m. 1990)
- Children: 3, including Nat Sciver-Brunt
- Education: Jesus College, Cambridge

Julia Longbottom CMG (born 13 July 1963) is a British diplomat and a former Ambassador of the United Kingdom to Japan between 2021 and 2026. She is the first woman ambassador to represent the United Kingdom in Tokyo.

== Education ==
Longbottom was educated at Bradford Girls' Grammar School in West Yorkshire, and Jesus College, Cambridge, where she gained a Bachelor of Arts degree in French and German. She is also educated in Japanese, Polish and Dutch. In the first she has attained full fluency.

== Career ==
=== Early career ===
Longbottom joined the Diplomatic Service at the Foreign and Commonwealth Office (FCO) immediately after graduating from Cambridge in 1986. She then spent her first two years on placements at the United Nations in New York and the European Commission in Brussels. Between 1990 and 1993, she spent her first period in Tokyo as the Political Second Secretary at the British Embassy to Japan. In 1994, she moved to the Foreign and Commonwealth Office's Hong Kong Department and worked as the Section Head for Nationality and Immigration until the handover of Hong Kong to the People's Republic of China in 1997. She was then appointed as the Head of Political and EU Section at the Embassy of the United Kingdom in the Hague.

=== Recent career ===
In 2012, Longbottom returned to Tokyo where she served as Deputy Head of Mission at the British Embassy in Tokyo until summer 2016. She then returned to the UK as the FCO's Director for Consular Services, along with a brief period serving as the director of the Foreign, Commonwealth and Development Office's Coronavirus Task Force.

In December 2020, it was announced that Longbottom would replace the retiring Paul Madden as the British Ambassador to Japan. She officially assumed the role in March 2021.

On 7 August 2024 Longbottom announced she would not attend a Nagasaki memorial to victims of the 1945 U.S. atomic bombing of the city because the mayor of Nagasaki did not invite representatives of the Israeli government.

== Personal life ==
Longbottom married Richard Sciver at Bolton Abbey in Wharfedale, North Yorkshire, on 28 December 1990 while on leave from her position in Tokyo. Together, Longbottom and Sciver maintain a UK residence in the Royal Borough of Kingston upon Thames. They have three adult children: two daughters and one son. The elder daughter, Nat Sciver-Brunt, is captain of the England women's cricket team.

Diplomatic posts
Preceded by Paul Madden	British Ambassador to Japan; 2021–present	Incumbent
