= Global Oriental =

Publishing house

Global Oriental is an imprint of the Dutch publishing house Brill. It used to be trade publishing company based in Kent, United Kingdom. It is the publisher of scholarly books on Japan and East Asia in fields such as History, Martial Arts, Arts and Literature. In April 2010 it was acquired by Brill publishers of Leiden, The Netherlands.

== Inner Asia journal ==
In 2005, Global Oriental formally took over publication of Inner Asia, the journal of the Mongolia and Inner Asia Studies Unit (MIASU) at the University of Cambridge.

MIASU was founded in 1986 as a group within the Department of Social Anthropology to promote research and teaching relating to Mongolia and Inner Asia on an inter-disciplinary basis. The unit aims to promote and encourage study of this important region and to provide training and support for research to all those concerned with its understanding. MIASU is currently one of the very few research-oriented forums in the world in which scholars can address the contemporary and historical problems of the region. The unit is also concerned with how "Inner Asia" as an object of study is being reconfigured, from the late-nineteenth century discourse of orientalism to contemporary critical studies of economic and cultural transformation.

Inner Asia is published twice yearly and edited by the MIASU's principal scholars, Caroline Humphrey, David Sneath and Uradyn E. Bulag.

== Specialized subjects ==
- Inner Asia journal
- Anthropology
- Arts
- China - General Reference
- Comparative & Cross Cultural Studies
- Education
- Environment
- Gender Studies
- Geography
- Health
- History
- Inner Asia
- Korea – General Reference
- Lafcadio Hearn Studies
- Languages of Asia
- Literature
- Martial Arts
- Media & Cultural Studies
- Memoir & Biography
- Military History
- Mongolia
- Philosophy
- Politics & Economics
- Psychology
- Rediscovering Series
- Religion
- Science & Technology
- Sociology
- Transport
- Travel
- 20th Century Japanese Writers Series
