= Arthur Villettes =

British diplomat

Arthur Villettes was a British diplomat who played an important role in diplomatic negotiations of the 18th century often serving as an envoy of the long-standing controller of British foreign policy the Duke of Newcastle. This reached a height during the War of the Austrian Succession when he served as the British Resident in Sardinia, and was given enormous discretion over negotiations with Britain's Allies and opponents until he caused serious offence to Austria following the Siege of Genoa in 1746.

Between 1750 and 1765, he served as British Ambassador to Switzerland.

== Bibliography ==
- Lodge, Sir Richard. Studies in Eighteenth Century Diplomacy 1740-1748. John Murray, 1930.
