= List of ambassadors of the United Kingdom to Japan =

British Ambassador to Japan
- Royal arms of His Majesty's Government
- Incumbent; Corin Robertson since 2026
- Foreign, Commonwealth and Development Office; British Embassy, Tokyo
- Style: Her Excellency
- Reports to: Secretary of State for Foreign, Commonwealth and Development Affairs
- Appointer: King Charles III
- Term length: At His Majesty's pleasure
- Inaugural holder: Sir Claude MacDonald
- Formation: 1905
- Salary: £115,000-£120,000
- Website: British Embassy Tokyo

The ambassador of the United Kingdom to Japan is the United Kingdom's foremost diplomatic representative in Japan, and is the head of the UK's diplomatic mission there.

The following is a chronological list of British heads of mission (ministers and ambassadors) in Japan from 1859. Before 1905, there were no ambassadors exchanged between the two countries, the highest rank being envoy extraordinary and minister plenipotentiary – a rank just below ambassador. Before 1859, there was no treaty and no diplomatic relations, because Japan was isolated from the world by the Tokugawa shogunate's policy of national isolation called sakoku (literally locked country).

== List of heads of mission ==
=== Envoys extraordinary and ministers plenipotentiary ===
Head of mission	Tenure begins	Tenure ends	British monarch	Japanese emperor
James Bruce, 8th Earl of Elgin	1858	1858	Queen Victoria	Kōmei
Sir Rutherford Alcock	1859	1865	Queen Victoria	Kōmei
Sir Harry Parkes	1865	1883	Queen Victoria	Meiji
Sir Francis Plunkett	1884	1887	Queen Victoria	Meiji
Hugh Fraser	1889	1894	Queen Victoria	Meiji
Power Henry Le Poer Trench	1894	1895	Queen Victoria	Meiji
Sir Ernest Satow	1895	1900	Queen Victoria	Meiji
Sir Claude MacDonald	1900	1905	Edward VII	Meiji

=== Ambassadors ===
Head of mission	Tenure begins	Tenure ends	British monarch	Japanese emperor
Sir Claude MacDonald	1905	1912	Edward VII	Meiji
Sir Conyngham Greene	1912	1919	George V	Taishō
Sir Charles Eliot	1919	1925	George V	Taishō
Sir John Tilley	1926	1931	George V	Shōwa
Sir Francis Lindley	1931	1934	George V	Shōwa
Sir Robert Clive	1934	1937	George V	Shōwa
Sir Robert Craigie	1937	1941	George VI	Shōwa

No representation (1941–1946, due to World War II)

During World War II, Setsuya Beppu worked in a consulate in Dublin in the Irish Free State, and was responsible for the Japanese citizens in the UK and Ireland.

=== Political representatives ===
- Sir Alvary Gascoigne (1946–1951)
- Sir Esler Dening (1951–1952)

=== Ambassadors ===
Head of mission	Tenure begins	Tenure ends	British monarch	Japanese emperor
Sir Esler Dening	1952	1957	Elizabeth II	Shōwa
Sir Daniel Lascelles	1957	1959	Elizabeth II	Shōwa
Sir Oscar Morland	1959	1963	Elizabeth II	Shōwa
Sir Francis Rundall	1963	1967	Elizabeth II	Shōwa
Sir John Pilcher	1967	1972	Elizabeth II	Shōwa
Sir Fred Warner	1972	1975	Elizabeth II	Shōwa
Sir Michael Wilford	1975	1980	Elizabeth II	Shōwa
Sir Hugh Cortazzi	1980	1984	Elizabeth II	Shōwa
Sir Sydney Giffard	1984	1986	Elizabeth II	Shōwa
Sir John Whitehead	1986	1992	Elizabeth II	Heisei (Akihito)
Sir John Boyd	1992	1996	Elizabeth II	Heisei (Akihito)
Sir David Wright	1996	1999	Elizabeth II	Heisei (Akihito)
Sir Stephen Gomersall	1999	2004	Elizabeth II	Heisei (Akihito)
Sir Graham Fry	2004	2008	Elizabeth II	Heisei (Akihito)
Sir David Warren	2008	2012	Elizabeth II	Heisei (Akihito)
Tim Hitchens	2012	2016	Elizabeth II	Heisei (Akihito)
Paul Madden	2017	2021	Elizabeth II	Heisei (Akihito)
Julia Longbottom	2021	2026	Elizabeth II; Charles III	Reiwa (Naruhito)
Corin Robertson	2026		Charles III	Reiwa (Naruhito)

== See also ==
- British Embassy, Tokyo
- Embassy of Japan, London
- List of ambassadors of Japan to the United Kingdom
- Japan–United Kingdom relations
  - Anglo-Japanese Friendship Treaty
  - Anglo-Japanese Treaty of Amity and Commerce
  - Anglo-Japanese Alliance
  - Treaty of San Francisco
- Foreign, Commonwealth and Development Office
- Foreign relations of the United Kingdom
