= George Warner =

George Warner may refer to:

- George Warner (rugby union), English rugby union player
- Sir George Warner (diplomat), British diplomat
- Sir George Frederic Warner, English archivist
- George Townsend Warner, English clergyman, schoolmaster and cricketer
