= Linda Kelly =

Linda Kelly may refer to:

- Linda L. Kelly (born 1949), Attorney General of Pennsylvania
- Linda Kelly (author) (1936–2019), English historian
- Linda Kelly (cyclist) (born 1993), Irish cyclist
