= Dom Philip Jebb =

English monk (1932–2014)

The Very Reverend Dom Philip Jebb OSB (14 August 1932 – 8 June 2014), whose original name was Anthony Reginald Austin Jebb, was a Benedictine monk at Downside Abbey and schoolmaster at Downside School, of which he was headmaster.

== Early life ==
Jebb was a son of Reginald Jebb and his wife, Eleanor Belloc, a daughter of Hilaire Belloc. He was also a grandson of George Robert Jebb, a civil engineer. When he was born, his parents were keeping a preparatory school at Hawkesyard, in Staffordshire, but in 1935 they relocated to live with Belloc at King's Land in West Sussex, where there was a private chapel and many visitors, including Roman Catholic writers and priests. After some home-schooling, from 1942 Jebb was educated at Worth School in Sussex and later at Downside School, where he arrived in 1944. He became a novice monk at Downside Abbey in 1950, when he was perplexed to be made to take the name of Brother Philip, as he had an elder brother of that name. Lastly he was educated at Christ's College, Cambridge, where he read classics.

Jebb's older brother, Philip, was an architect, and he also had two sisters, the elder of whom, Marianne, became a Canoness of St Augustine at the Priory of Our Lady of Good Counsel, at Haywards Heath, taking the name of Sister Emmanuel Mary, and was headmistress of its school.

== Career ==
Returning to his life at Downside after Cambridge, Jebb was a historian and archivist for the Benedictine order in England and was the main proponent of the building of a new library at Downside.

Jebb allegedly had out-of-body experiences, finding he could take himself out of his body when stopping to pray during a walk in the fields; but he abandoned this after once having great trouble getting back into his body.

He was a chaplain to the Sovereign Military Order of Malta and took groups of pilgrims to Lourdes.

Jebb began to teach at Downside School in 1960, and it was reported in 1970 that he had been teaching fencing to boys at the school for some ten years. He was headmaster of the school from 1980 to 1991. At the beginning of December 1980, soon after he began his new role, Jebb began punishing the use of cannabis by the boys, announcing "I have expelled one boy and asked another five to leave. Others will be dealt with in different ways." The boys to be dismissed had been caught dealing in the drug. Two months later, a further increase of discipline resulted in a rowdy midnight protest by the boys, wearing pyjamas. Jebb then announced the cancellation of a plan to admit girls to the school.

After retiring from the school in 1991, Jebb was Prior of Downside. He died at Bath, Somerset, on 8 June 2014. At the time of his death, he was living near Downside at Fosse House, Stratton-on-the-Fosse.

== Selected publications ==
- Dom Philip Jebb, ed., Missale de Lesnes: MS L404 in the Library of the Victoria and Albert Museum (Henry Bradshaw Society, 1964, ISBN 978-1870252867)
- Dom Philip Jebb, Religious Education Drift or Decision? (London: Longman & Todd, 1968)
- Dom Philip Jebb, Religious Education: Downside Symposium (London: Darton, Longman & Todd, 1968, ISBN 978-0232481464)
- Dom Philip Jebb, By Death Parted: The Stories of Six Widows (St Bede's Press, 2002, ISBN 978-0932506450)
