= Philip Jebb =

Philip Vincent Belloc Jebb (15 March 1927 – 7 April 1995) was a British architect and Liberal Party politician.

== Background ==
Jebb was the son of Reginald Jebb and Eleanor Belloc. He was a grandson of the writer and Liberal MP Hilaire Belloc. He was also a grandson of the civil engineer George Robert Jebb. He was educated at Downside School and King's College, Cambridge. In 1955 he married Lucy Margaret Pollen, sister of the architect Francis Pollen. They had two sons and two daughters. His brother Anthony became a monk of the Benedictine order at Downside Abbey, being given the name of Brother Philip Jebb.

== Professional career ==
After national service, Jebb studied architecture at Cambridge, qualified as an architect and eventually initiated a private practice. In 1967-70 he enlarged Abbey House, adjacent to Audley End House, to three times its former size for the Hon. Robin Neville. About 1967 he aided portrait painter Dominick Elwes in the design of a Mediterranean-style apartment complex in Andalucia, Spain, which was completed in 1970. In 1971, Jebb designed a restaurant for Winston Churchill's house, Chartwell, on behalf of the National Trust. During the early 1980s he designed Government House on Lundy Island, which is now available to rent for holidays by means of the Landmark Trust. The renovation and remodelling of country houses, and the addition of features necessary for their opening to the public, was a speciality of Jebb. The Dowager Duchess of Devonshire spoke highly of his public lavatories at Chatsworth House.

== Political career ==
Jebb announced as a late Liberal candidate for the new Central division of Norfolk at the 1950 General Election. The district included much of the old Norfolk East constituency which had been represented by the former Liberal, Frank Medlicott, who had not been opposed by an official Liberal candidate before. Jebb was defeated into third place and did not campaign for parliament again.

General Election 1950:
Party	Candidate	Votes	%	±%
National Liberal	Frank Medlicott	20,407	51.3	
Labour	G. W. Holderness	16,516	41.5	
Liberal	Philip Vincent Belloc Jebb	2,859	7.2	
Majority		3,891	9.8	
Turnout			84.3	
National Liberal win				
