= Embassy of Russia, Tehran =

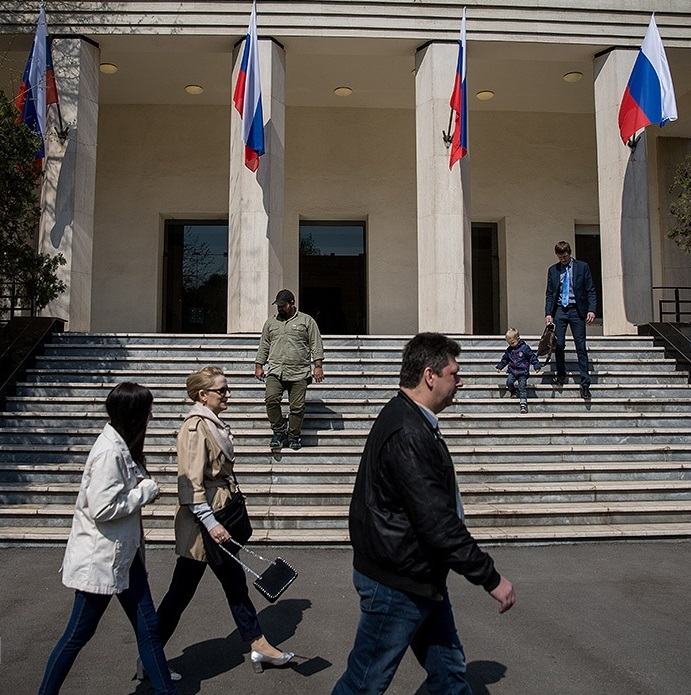
- Location: Tehran, Iran
- Address: 39 Nofel Loshato St., Atabek Park, Tehran
- Coordinates: 35°41′55″N 51°24′51″E
- Ambassador: Alexey Dedov
- Website: https://iran.mid.ru/en//

The Russian Embassy in Tehran (Persian: سفارت روسیه در تهران) is the official diplomatic mission of the Russian Federation in the Islamic Republic of Iran. Since 1915, it has been located at Atabek Garden.

== Attack on the embassy ==
In 1828, Russian diplomat Alexander Griboyedov found out that some Georgian and Armenian women lived among Iranian men, and considered this a violation of the Treaty of Turkmenchay. He then requested that they be extradited to Russia, and with the help of Mirza Yakub, successfully received two women from the house of Asef al-Dowleh into his delegation.

Popular discontent against this humiliating move led to an increase in anti-Russian sentiment, and some attacked the Russian embassy as a response to this extradition, which was further fueled by Ijtihad Mirza Masih. The attack happened on 11 February 1829, and led to the death of most officials working in the embassy, including Griboyedov and Mirza Yakub. Griboyedov's body was later transported and buried in Tbilisi.

After this incident, the Shah of Iran, Fath-Ali Shah Qajar, sent a delegation to Moscow to deliver an official letter of apology to Tsar Nicholas I, in hopes of preventing further deterioration of relations. As a compromise, the Iranian delegation agreed to put Mirza Masih into exile to Al-Atabat Al-Aliyat, which is in modern-day Iraq. One member of the delegation offered condolences to Griboyedov's family, and the Shah even personally gifted the Shah Diamond to the Tsar.

== Refuge of Mohammad Ali Shah Qajar ==
On 13 July 1909, the constitutionalists successfully gained power in the Triumph of Tehran, who then proceeded to dethrone Mohammad Ali Shah Qajar and force him to seek refuge. He stayed at the Russian embassy for a short period before being forced into exile to Russia itself.

== Current building ==
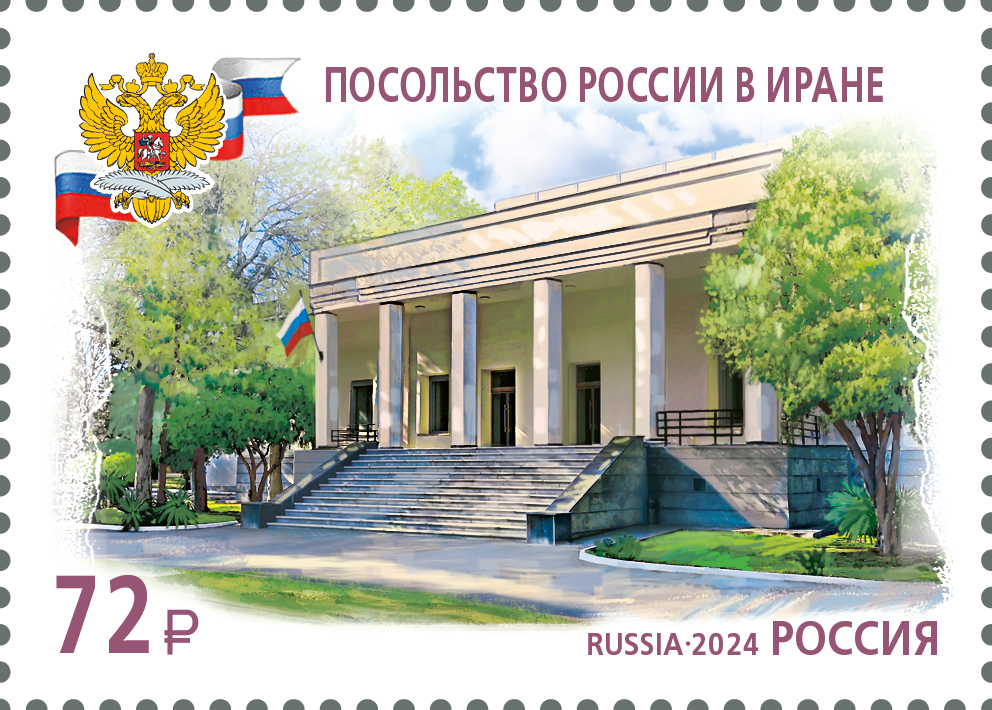
The embassy on a Russian stamp, 2024

In September 1915, Russia rented Atabek Park, which was then owned by a Russian bank in Iran. The bank rented the park to the government, and charged 1,650 Manats until March 1916, and 6,000 Manats per year for three years after that.

The Russian government paid the rent until its own revolution in 1917. The building returned to the ownership of the bank, which it agreed to return to Iranian ownership in 1921 following the Russo-Persian Friendship Treaty. The Soviet foreign minister requested that the embassy be relocated to Atabek Park, and the Iranian foreign minister agreed.

Following the establishment of an Iranian national bank, neither the bank nor the Soviet Foreign Ministry officially registered Atabek Park. The Soviet Foreign ministry considered it to be Iranian property, and requested that it pay rent to the bank, or in return, Moscow will provide a building for the Iranian embassy. The Iranian side never responded.

The main architect of the building is Mirza Mehdi Khan Shaghaghi, who was the first engineer who personally designed it and supervised its construction.

== Tehran Conference ==
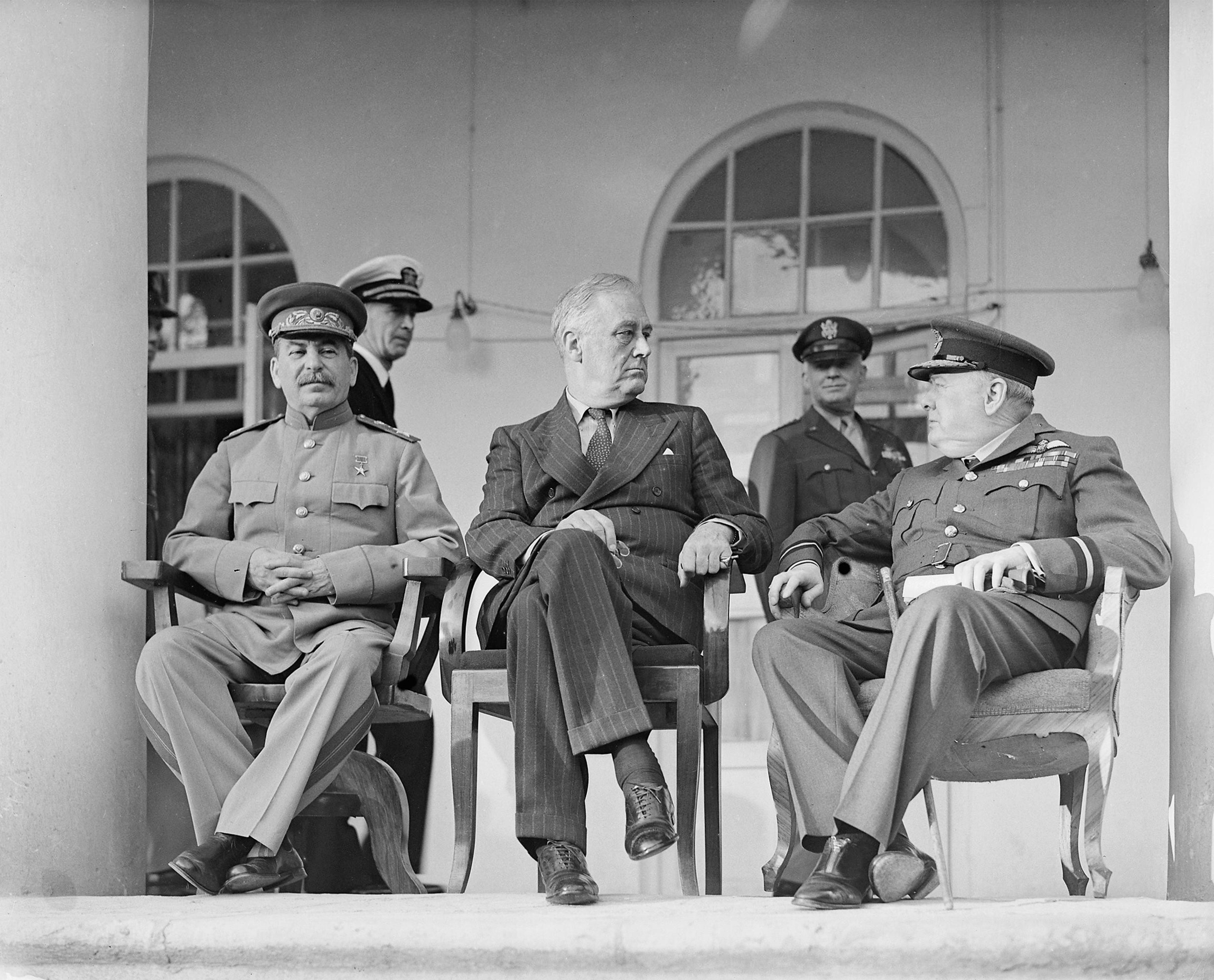
The leaders of the Big Three at the Tehran Conference, 1943

The Tehran Conference was secretly held in the Soviet Embassy in Tehran during December 6-9, 1943. The main attendees of the conference were British PM Winston Churchill, American president Franklin Roosevelt, and Soviet leader Joseph Stalin. The conference successfully concluded with an agreement to open a second front in the European theatre of WWII.

== List of ambassadors ==
- Alexander Sadovnikov
- Levan Dzhagarian

== Related pages ==
- Consulate of Russia, Tabriz
- Iran-Russia Relations
- Atabek Park
- Embassy of Iran, Moscow
