= Maurice Peterson =

British diplomat

Sir Maurice Drummond Peterson GCMG (10 March 1889 – 15 March 1952) was a British diplomat who was minister or ambassador to several countries.

== Career ==
Maurice Drummond Peterson was the younger son of William Peterson (later Sir William Peterson, Principal of University College, Dundee and later McGill University). He was educated at Rugby School and Magdalen College, Oxford, where he gained a first class degree in modern history. He entered the Foreign Office in 1913 and served at Washington, Prague, Tokyo, Cairo and Madrid before being attached to the British delegation to the Washington Naval Conference between October 1921 and February 1922 as private secretary to Arthur Balfour. He was head of the Egyptian department in the Foreign Office 1931–1936 including four months in Cairo in 1934 as acting High Commissioner (during the absence of Sir Miles Lampson) when he was instrumental in resolving a political dispute in the Egyptian government which resulted in the resignation of the Prime Minister, Abdel Fattah Yahya Ibrahim Pasha.

Peterson was Minister to Bulgaria 1936–38. In March 1938 he was appointed to be "His Majesty's Ambassador Extraordinary and Plenipotentiary at Bagdad" but this was quickly corrected to "His Majesty's Ambassador Extraordinary and Plenipotentiary to His Majesty the King of Iraq." However, he remained in Iraq only until March 1939 when he was appointed ambassador to Spain, then under the regime of Francisco Franco. In the early days of the 1939–45 war he defended British interests with such persistence that he was officially congratulated by the then Foreign Secretary, Lord Halifax, yet in June 1940 he was recalled to London and served as Controller of Overseas Publicity in the Ministry of Information 1940–41 and as head of the Egyptian, eastern and far eastern departments of the Foreign Office 1942–44.

Peterson was Ambassador to Turkey 1944–46 and finally Ambassador to the Soviet Union 1946–49. In 1949 he retired from the Diplomatic Service due to illness, and was subsequently a director of Midland Bank.

== Publications ==
- Both sides of the curtain: an autobiography, Constable, London, 1950

== Honours ==
Maurice Peterson was appointed CMG in the 1933 New Year Honours, knighted KCMG in 1938 on his appointment to Iraq, and promoted GCMG in the 1947 New Year Honours.

== Offices held ==
Diplomatic posts
Preceded by Charles Bentinck	Minister to Bulgaria; 1936–1938	Succeeded by George Rendel
Preceded by Sir Archibald Clark Kerr	Ambassador Extraordinary and Plenipotentiary to His Majesty the King of Iraq; 1938–1939	Succeeded by Sir Basil Newton
Preceded by Henry Chilton	His Majesty's Ambassador Extraordinary and Plenipotentiary in Spain; 1939–1940	Succeeded by Sir Samuel Hoare
Preceded by Hughe Knatchbull-Hugessen	His Majesty's Ambassador Extraordinary and Plenipotentiary at Angora; 1944–1946	Succeeded by Sir David Kelly
Preceded by Archibald Clark Kerr, 1st Baron Inverchapel	Ambassador Extraordinary and Plenipotentiary at Moscow; 1946–1949	Succeeded by Sir David Kelly
