= Sayers Common =

Village in West Sussex, England

Coordinates: 50.94926°N 0.19798°W

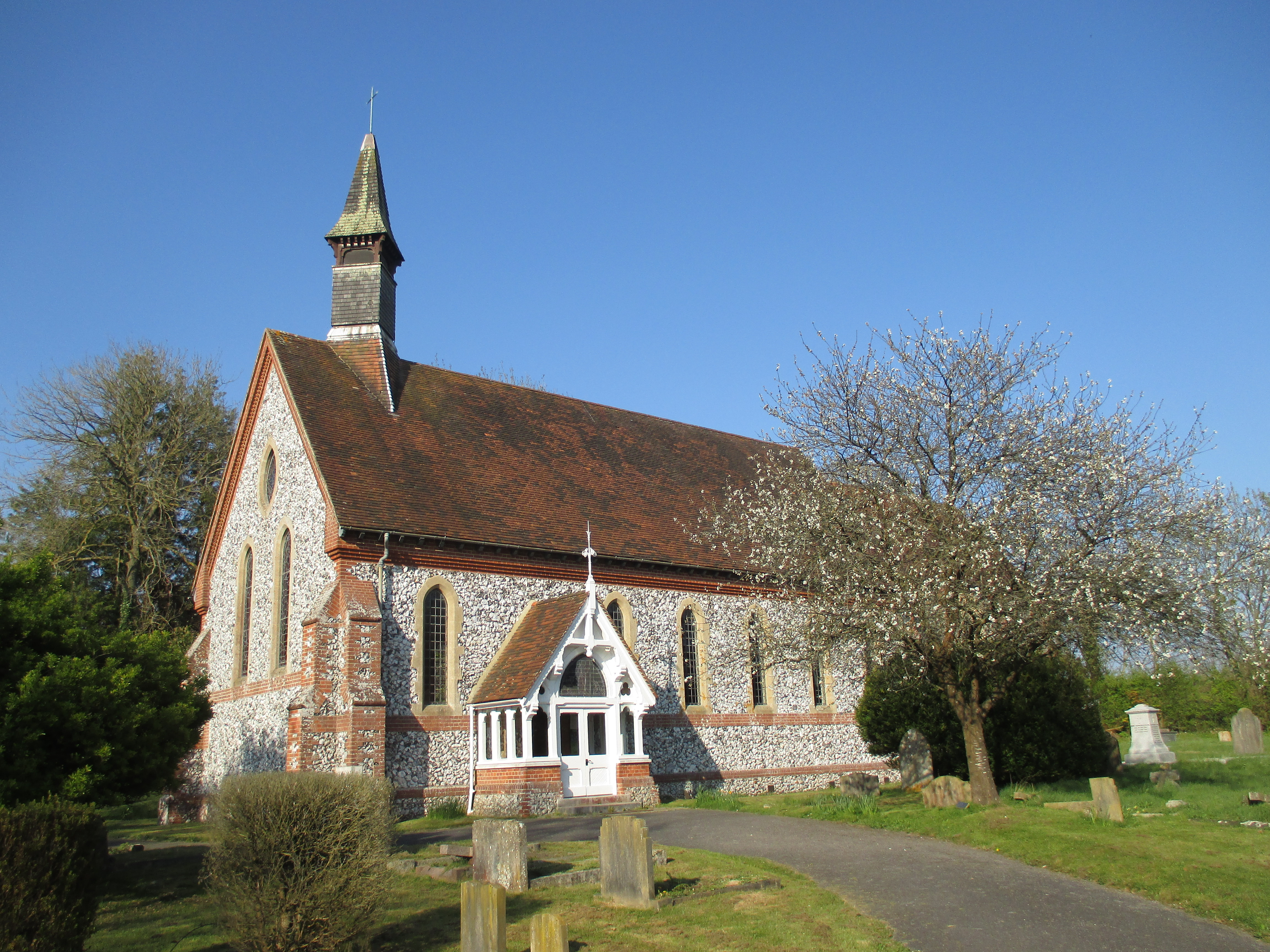
- Christ Church, Sayers Common

- Location within West Sussex
- OS grid reference: TQ266182
- Civil parish: Hurstpierpoint and Sayers Common
- District: Mid Sussex
- Shire county: West Sussex
- Region: South East
- Country: England
- Sovereign state: United Kingdom
- Post town: HASSOCKS
- Postcode district: BN6
- Dialling code: 01273
- Police: Sussex
- Fire: West Sussex
- Ambulance: South East Coast
- UK Parliament: Arundel and South Downs

Sayers Common is a village in the Mid Sussex District of West Sussex, England. With Hurstpierpoint it forms one of the Mid Sussex parishes. It is located two miles (3.2 km) north-west of Hurstpierpoint. Situated until the 1990s on the main London to Brighton A23 road it has become a more popular residential village since being partially bypassed by the new A23 road. It has some very old cottages at its heart, and also contains the former Priory of Our Lady of Good Counsel, which was a residential retreat and is now a special school for children with autism. The parish has an area of 2,029.88 square kilometres (501,590 acres) and a population of 6264 persons (2001 census). The village has become well known in recent years as the location for one of the south easts largest car boot sales open most Sundays from March to October. It is in the civil parish of Hurstpierpoint and Sayers Common.

== Notable areas ==
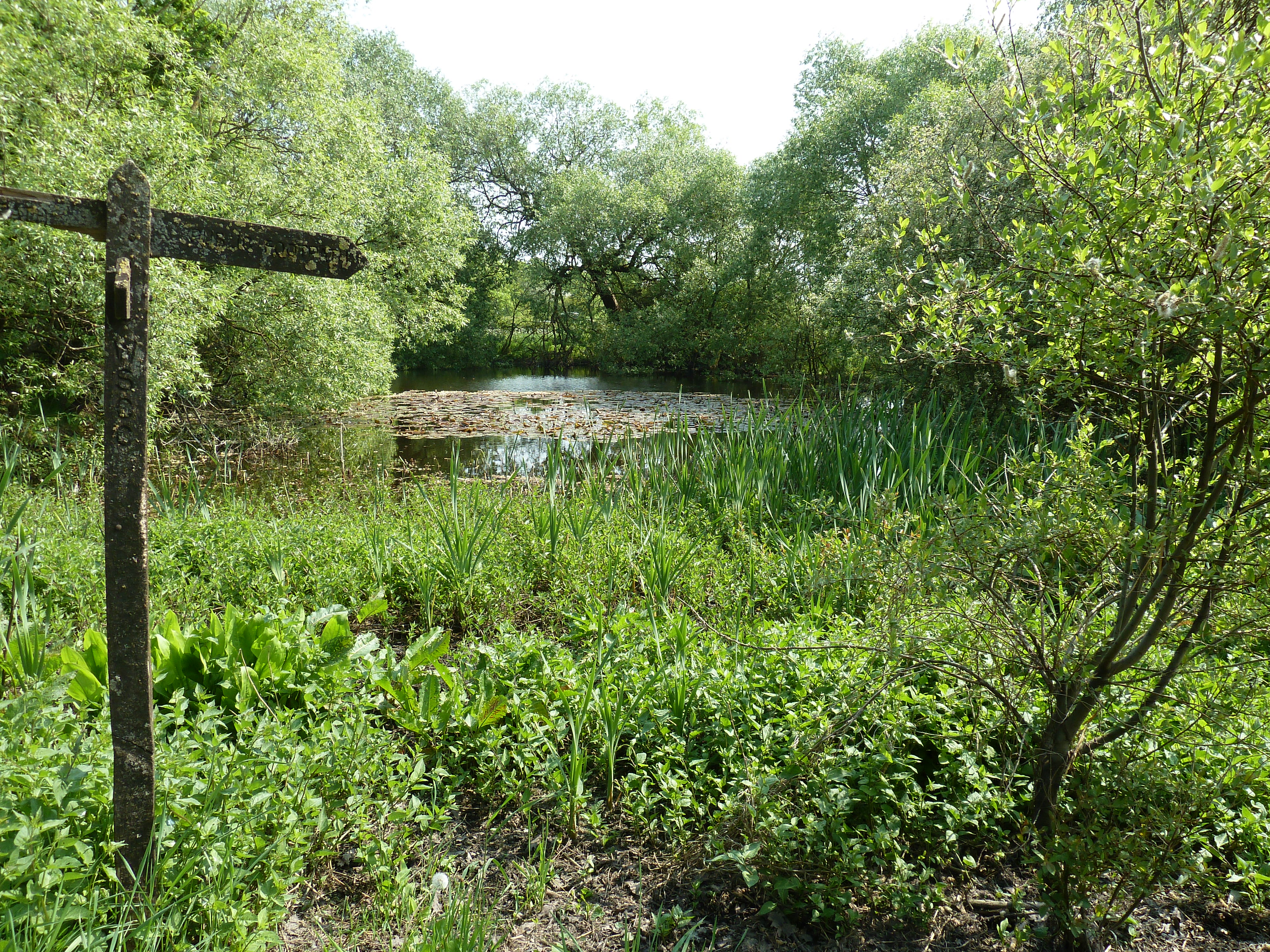
Pond at Stuccles Farm

Sayers Common Wood and Coombe Wood, e.g. TQ 267 180, sandwiched between the old and the new London Roads, are well-loved ancient bluebell woods, large by the standards of this countryside, but noisy.

Sayers Common church (TQ269 186) built in 1880, has a wild flower churchyard, with ox eye daisy, spring sedge and adder's tongue fern and in the past has had green winged orchid. It can be rich in meadow fungi, including the rare straw club and many more.

Just west of the church, along the north edge of Furze Field wood, are derelict brook meadows (TQ 263 185) rich in wildlife, but rapidly losing value (2012). There are roe deer amongst the tufted hair grass and dropwort next to the brook that divides the meadow. This tangle of coarse vegetation is squeezing out the betony, sneezewort, pepper saxifrage, devil's bit, tormentil and spotted orchid that still cling on around the edges. South of Furze Field (TQ 262 182) is a damp meadow wholly dominated by tufted hair grass, with some spotted orchids.

The countryside around the ex-Priory, Stuccles and New House Farms (TQ 263 189) has many oaks, and in July the purple hairstreak butterflies can be seen flitting and sunning in their canopies.
