= Priory of Our Lady of Good Counsel =

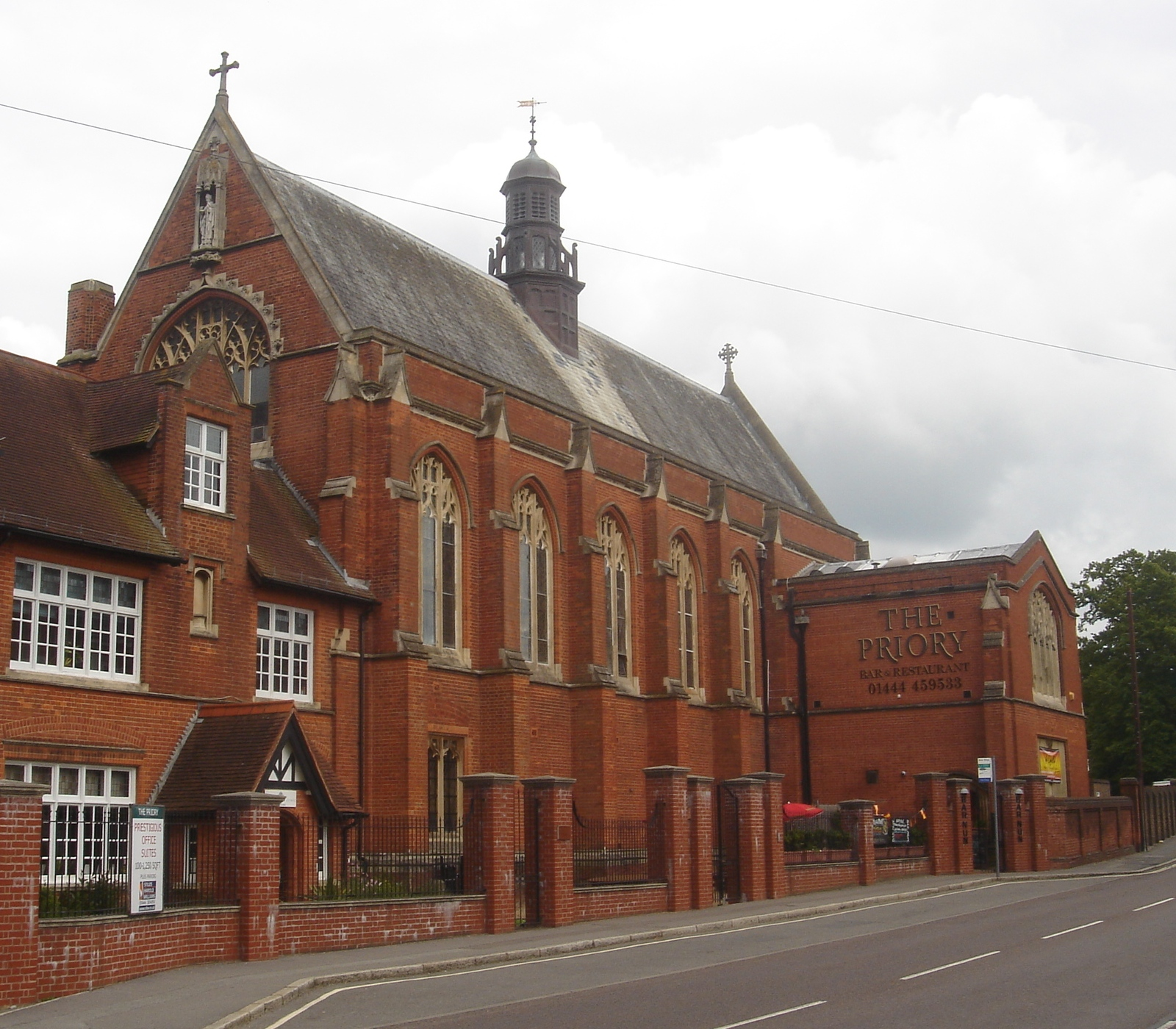
- The former home of the Priory at Franklynn Road, Haywards Heath
- Priory of Our Lady of Good Counsel
- 50°51′36″N 0°01′43″W
- Location: 1886–1978: Haywards Heath, West Sussex; 1978–2008: Sayers Common, West Sussex; 2008– : Kingston near Lewes, West Sussex
- Country: England
- Denomination: Roman Catholic

History
- Dedication: Our Lady of Good Counsel

The Priory of Our Lady of Good Counsel is a Roman Catholic priory of canonesses regular at Kingston near Lewes, West Sussex, England. Its members formerly taught girls at an independent school in Haywards Heath, then from 1978 to 2008 lived at a Monastery and Centre for Pastoral Work at Sayers Common, West Sussex.

The Priory's former buildings at Haywards Heath, built in 1886 and designed by Edward Goldie, are Grade II listed and were so designated on 11 December 1987. They have changed little in external appearance since being deconsecrated, but in 2019 they were converted into more than forty apartments, with substantial modernisation of the interiors.

The Priory's former home at Sayers Common is now occupied by a special school called LVS Hassocks.

== History ==
In 1629, the English monastery of Canonesses Regular of Lateran, at Louvain, sent members to Bruges, then in the Spanish Netherlands, to begin a new house there. Their work was in the field of educating girls, but the French Revolution disrupted it, and they left the city. They were able to return in 1802, and in 1886 sent out a party of English nuns to establish a daughter house at Haywards Heath.

The new Priory was Haywards Heath's first Roman Catholic place of worship since the English Reformation. The foundation stone of the Priory's chapel was laid on 5th May 1890 by John Butt, Bishop of Southwark, who opened the completed chapel on 18 June 1891. It was formally consecrated in 1897 by Cardinal Vaughan, Archbishop of Westminster. It had fittings of oak, and the altar space was divided from the south transept (which was for the use of the public) by an iron screen. The roof had a bell turret and there was a statue of Augustine of Hippo on the chapel's western gable. The chapel contained a Martyrs' Shrine, with a stained glass window picturing Margaret Pole, Countess of Salisbury, and Margaret Clitherow. As completed, the whole complex consisted of a large rectangular building, enclosing a quadrangle, with the chapel forming part of it, and various further buildings to the north and east, all attached to each other.

In August 1924, Peter Amigo, Bishop of Southwark, visited Haywards Heath and raised the status of the Priory to that of an independent house, meaning that it would no longer be subsidiary to its mother house in Bruges.

In October 1928, the Priory was visited by Stanley Baldwin, the British prime minister, who was related to one of the sisters.

A separate Roman Catholic parish church, St Paul's, was established nearby in 1930.

In October 1978, the Priory moved to Kingsland, a Georgian country house near Sayers Common. Most of the contents of its former buildings, including "a large quantity of Victorian and modern pine furniture", were sold at an auction in the Great Hall in November 1978, raising more than £13,000. The chancel arch crucifix was given to Arundel Cathedral. The chapel organ, built in 1898 by Bishop & Son, was dismantled and later installed in the new chapel at Kingsland.

In October 1979, a new purpose-built chapel and retreat buildings at Kingsland were blessed and the new Priory was formally opened as a pastoral centre. In 1980, the new buildings at the Monastery and Centre for Pastoral Work, which included a conical chapel echoing an oast house, and a large new semi-circular range designed by Michael Blee, won a commendation from the Royal Institute of British Architects. In July 1986, when the Priory celebrated its centenary, there were 36 sisters, led by the Prioress, Mother Mary Thomas.

About 2008, the buildings and land of the Priory of Our Lady at Kingsland were sold and are now occupied by a special school called LVS Hassocks. The community of the Priory of Our Lady moved to Dove Cottage, Kingston Ridge, Kingston-near-Lewes, where it leads a contemplative life and has a retreat programme.

The Priory is a charitable organisation and is registered with the Charity Commission for England and Wales.

== Priory School ==
As early as June 1891, the Priory at Haywards Heath was taking in "young lady pupils" to educate, acting as a boarding school. This was usually called "the Priory School", and in 1899 was listed as a secondary school for girls. A late 19th-century pupil was the writer Daisy Ashford, who was at the school from 1898 to 1899, when she was aged seventeen and eighteen.

The sports played by the girls included croquet.

In July 1909, a new wing for the use of the school was under construction, and in February 1910 it was reported that there had been an increase in the numbers in the school.

It was reported in 1901 and 1914 that the nuns of the Priory "receive a limited number of young Ladies for education". Pupils were prepared for universities.

During the First World War, a Belgian girl, Marie-Noële Jourda de Vaux, was sent to the Priory School, as her mother's sister was already there as a nun.

In 1945, Marianne Jebb (born 1923), a grand-daughter of Hilaire Belloc, joined the community. An older sister of Dom Philip Jebb, later head of Downside School, she went on to become "a witty, much-loved headmistress" of the Priory School, as Sister Emmanuel Mary Jebb.

The school was still teaching girls in 1971.

Headmistresses

This is an incomplete list

- 1938–1950: Sister Mary Brigid
- 1968: Sister Emmanuel Mary Jebb

After the departure of the nuns, the Priory School's building at Haywards Heath was converted into offices, conference facilities, and a restaurant.

In November 2007, the former priory appeared in Ramsay's Kitchen Nightmares, fronted by Gordon Ramsay. It was then occupied by The Priory Grill, a 100-seat restaurant, but this closed in 2008. A further redevelopment of the complex into 43 one, two, and three bedroom flats was completed in August 2019.

== Former Priory School pupils ==
- Daisy Ashford, 1898 to 1899
- Marie-Noële Kelly, 1915 to 1918
- Charlotte Bingham, 1949 to 1958
