= Laurence Kelly (writer) =

English writer (1933–2025)

Laurence Charles Kevin Kelly (11 April 1933 – 23 July 2025) was an English writer.

== Life and career ==
Kelly was born in Brussels, Belgium on 11 April 1933, the son of a diplomat father, Sir David Kelly, and his wife, Marie-Noële (née de Vaux). He was educated at Downside and New College, Oxford where he got a scholarship to study history. He first visited Moscow in 1950, where his father was serving as the British ambassador. Serving in the Life Guards, he learnt Russian and became an army interpreter. He also served in the Foreign Office in the mid-1950s.

As a writer, he wrote acclaimed biographies of two important Russian figures from the early 19th century: Mikhail Lermontov and Alexander Griboyedov. He won the Cheltenham Prize for Lermontov: Tragedy in the Caucasus. He has also edited literary anthologies on Moscow, St Petersburg and Istanbul. He was elected a Fellow of the Royal Society of Literature in 2003. He was married to the historian Linda Kelly, who died in 2019.

Kelly died on 23 July 2025, at the age of 92.

== Works ==
- Lermontov: Tragedy in the Caucasus (Constable, 1977) ISBN 978-0-094-61710-0
- (Ed.) St. Petersburg: A Travellers' Companion (Constable, 1981) ISBN 978-0-094-63530-2
- (Ed.) Moscow: A Travellers' Companion (Constable, 1983) ISBN 978-0-094-64750-3
- (Ed.) Istanbul: A Travellers' Companion (Constable, 1987) ISBN 978-0-094-66030-4
- (Ed., with Linda Kelly) Proposals: A Lovers' Anthology (Constable, 1989) ISBN 978-0-094-68880-3
- Diplomacy and Murder in Tehran: Alexander Griboyedov and Imperial Russia's Mission to the Shah of Persia (I. B. Tauris, 2002) ISBN 978-1-860-64666-9
