= Archibald Clark Kerr, 1st Baron Inverchapel =

British diplomat (1882–1951)

The Right Honourable The Lord Inverchapel GCMG PC
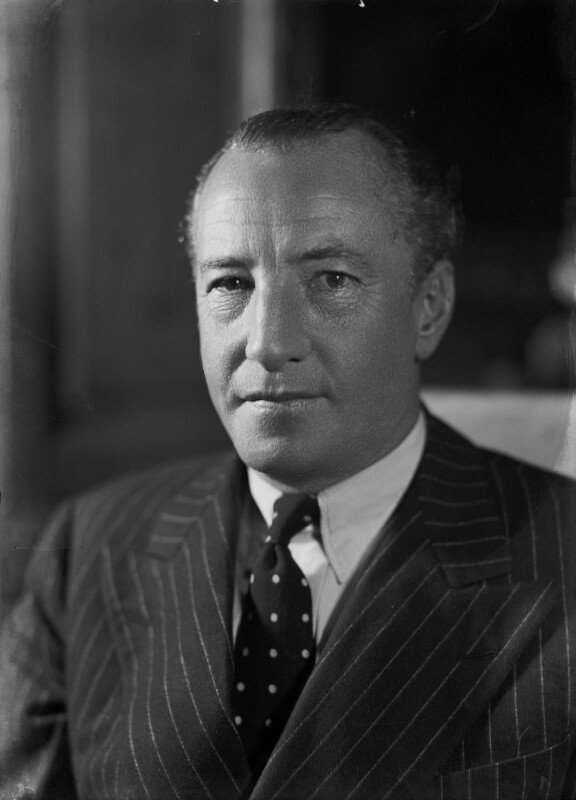
- Kerr in 1938

Ambassador Extraordinary and Plenipotentiary at Washington
- In office 1946–1948
- Monarch: George VI
- Prime Minister: Clement Attlee
- Preceded by: The Viscount Halifax
- Succeeded by: Oliver Franks

Personal details
- Born: 17 March 1882 Watsons Bay, Sydney, Australia
- Died: 5 July 1951 (aged 69) Greenock, Scotland
- Spouse: María Teresa Díaz Salas (m. 1929)

Archibald John Kerr Clark Kerr, 1st Baron Inverchapel, GCMG, PC (17 March 1882 – 5 July 1951), known as Sir Archibald Clark Kerr between 1935 and 1946, was a British diplomat. He served as Ambassador to the Soviet Union between 1942 and 1946 and to the United States between 1946 and 1948.

== Background ==
An Australian-born Scot, Lord Inverchapel was born Archibald John Kerr Clark, the son of John Kerr Clark (1838–1910), originally from Lanarkshire, Scotland, and Kate Louisa (1846–1926), daughter of Sir John Struan Robertson, five times Premier of the Colony of New South Wales. His family emigrated to England in 1889. In 1911 he assumed the surname of Kerr in addition to that of Clark. He attended Bath College from 1892 to 1900.

== Diplomatic career ==
Kerr entered the Foreign Service in 1906. Early on, he made the mistake of challenging the Foreign Office over its Egyptian policy. Consequently, he found himself posted to a series of capitals in Latin America. He was Envoy Extraordinary and Minister Plenipotentiary to various Central American republics between 1925 and 1928, to Chile between 1928 and 1930, to Sweden between 1931 and 1934 and to Iraq between 1935 and 1938.

He distinguished himself enough in these posts to secure a prestigious appointment as Ambassador to China between 1938 and 1942 during the Japanese occupation.

In the ensuing years, Inverchapel developed a close relationship with the Nationalist Chinese leader Chiang Kai-shek and spent most of his posting explaining why Britain could not offer him any substantive aid in his struggle against the Japanese invaders.

He argued for British aid to China based upon humanitarian concerns, the preservation of British economic influence and the principle of national self-determination. Despite the lack of aid from Britain, he impressed the Chinese with his interest in Confucian philosophy and with his determination. After the British consulate in Chongqing was almost completely destroyed by Japanese bombing in 1940, other diplomatic missions evacuated, but he kept the Union Jack flying close to Chinese government buildings. He regularly swam in the Yangtze River and, after meeting the American writer Ernest Hemingway, dismissed him derisively: "Tough? Why, I'm tougher than he is!"

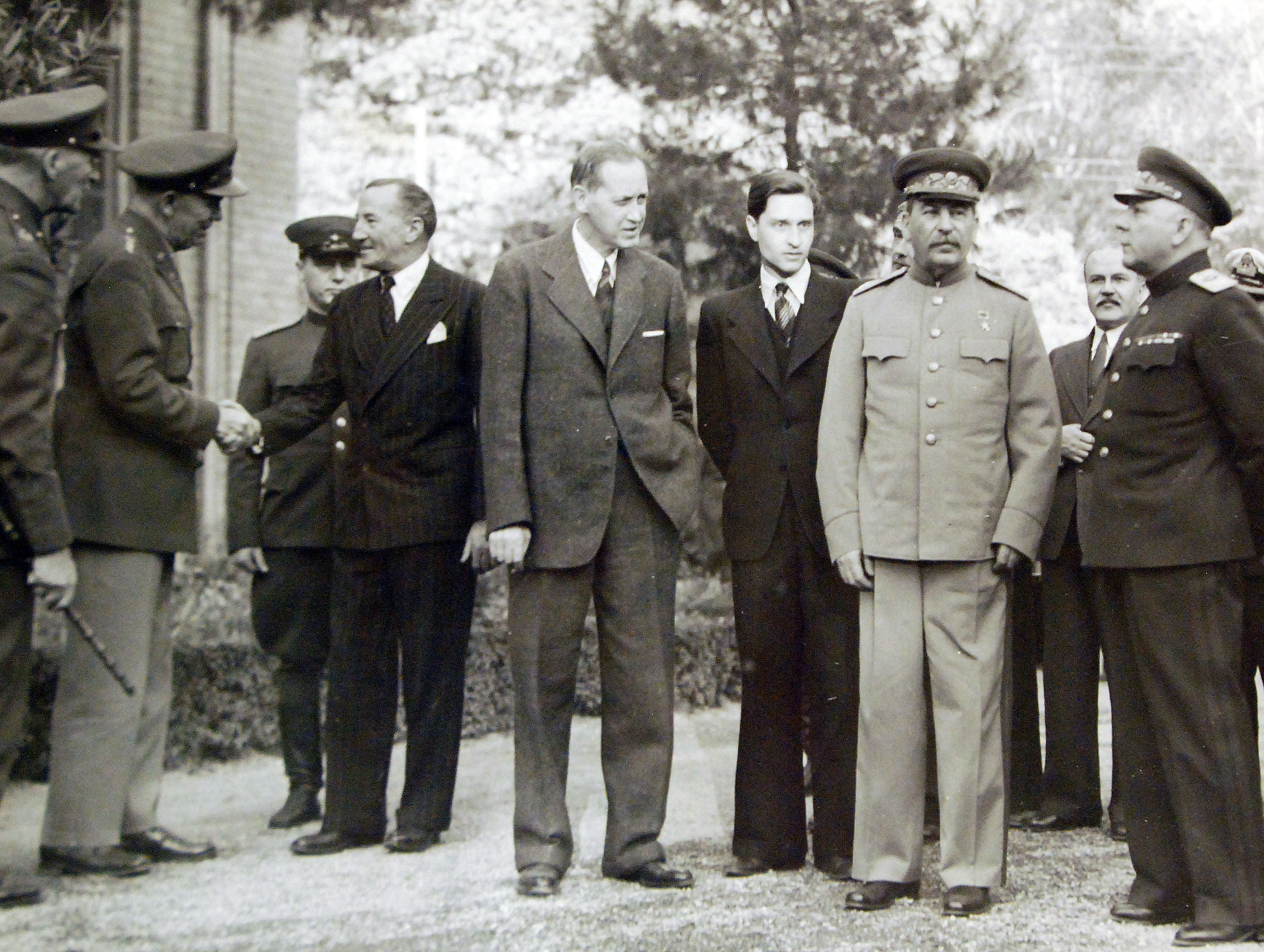
Kerr shaking hands with George Marshall at the Tehran Conference. From right to left: Kliment Voroshilov, Vyacheslav Molotov, Josef Stalin, Valentin Berezhkov, Harry Hopkins, Archibald Clark Kerr, and George C. Marshall.

He was moved to Moscow in February 1942, where he forged a remarkable relationship with Stalin and facilitated a number of Anglo-Soviet diplomatic conferences. His work there and at the Big Three Conferences (such as Yalta and Potsdam) put him at the centre of international politics during the final pivotal years of the Second World War. Throughout his posting in Moscow, he unsuccessfully sought clearer direction from the Foreign Office in London. He often fell back upon a directive received from Churchill in February 1943: "You want a directive? All right. I don't mind kissing Stalin's bum, but I'm damned if I'll lick his arse!"

As the war neared its end, Kerr became increasingly concerned about Soviet plans for the postwar world. He did not think the Soviets planned to begin spreading world revolution, but feared that they were preparing to exert their power well beyond their prewar sphere of influence. He voiced deep-seated concerns about Soviet expansionism for the first time in a lengthy memorandum on Soviet policy dated 31 August 1944. He then forecast three likely results of the war: the removal of any immediate threat to Soviet security, the consolidation of Stalin's dominant position and the Soviet use of communist parties in other countries to serve the interests of "Russia as a state as distinct from Russia as a revolutionary notion". This closely resembled the conclusions that George F. Kennan included in a telegram to Washington a few months later.

After the war, he was appointed Ambassador to the United States, a post he held until 1948. An acquaintance of Guy Burgess and Donald Duart Maclean's superior in Washington, he took their defection to the Soviet Union badly. The affair also cast a shadow over his career.

He was appointed a Knight Commander of the Order of St Michael and St George (KCMG) in the 1935 New Year Honours and promoted to Knight Grand Cross of the Order (GCMG) in 1942 and was sworn of the Privy Council in the 1944 New Year Honours. In 1946 he was elevated to the peerage as Baron Inverchapel, of Loch Eck in the County of Argyll.

From November 1948 to January 1949 he was a member of the British delegation to the Committee for the Study of European Unity, convened by the Brussels Treaty Organisation to draw up the blueprint of the future Council of Europe.

== Personal life ==
Kerr's personal life has been described as colourful. A bisexual, as a young diplomat he lived in Washington with Major Archibald Butt (a military adviser to President Taft), and Butt's partner, the artist Frank Millet. When he returned to the city 35 years later as British ambassador, he raised eyebrows "by going to stay in Eagle Grove, Iowa, with a strapping farm boy whom he had found waiting for a bus in Washington".

While stationed in Moscow, Kerr took a liking in Evgeni [later Eugene] Yost, a 24-year-old Volga German embassy butler who had got into legal trouble. At Kerr's personal request, Stalin granted him permission to leave the Soviet Union to become Kerr's masseur and valet. Kerr jokingly referred to Yost as "a Russian slave given to me by Stalin".

A close confidant of the Kaiser's sister in the years before the Great War, he was also a disappointed suitor of the Queen Mother before his marriage, divorce and remarriage to María Teresa Díaz Salas. Politically on the left, a noted wit and unconventional in manner, he was sometimes suspected of excessive understanding for the Soviet position. His biographer, Donald Gillies, considered the rumoured pro-Soviet sympathies to be highly unlikely.

He is best remembered in the public imagination for a much reproduced note he is said to have written in 1943 to Lord Pembroke while he was Ambassador to Moscow. A copy of the letter was published in The Spectator in 1978 with the comment that "an acquaintance has been delving among the Foreign Office records for the war years".

"My Dear Reggie,

In these dark days man tends to look for little shafts of light that spill from Heaven. My days are probably darker than yours, and I need, my God I do, all the light I can get. But I am a decent fellow, and I do not want to be mean and selfish about what little brightness is shed upon me from time to time. So I propose to share with you a tiny flash that has illuminated my sombre life and tell you that God has given me a new Turkish colleague whose card tells me that he is called Mustapha Kunt.

We all feel like that, Reggie, now and then, especially when Spring is upon us, but few of us would care to put it on our cards. It takes a Turk to do that.

Sir Archibald Clerk Kerr,

H.M. Ambassador"

In 1929, he married María Teresa Díaz Salas, of Santiago, Chile, the daughter of Javier Díaz Lira and Ventura Salas Edwards. They were divorced in 1945 and remarried in 1947. They had no children. He died in July 1951, aged 69.

Diplomatic posts
Preceded by William O'Reilly	Minister of the United Kingdom to Guatemala, Honduras, Nicaragua and El Salvador; 1925–1928	Succeeded by David Rodgers
Preceded by Sir Thomas Hohler	Minister of the United Kingdom to Chile; 1928–1930	Succeeded by Sir Henry Chilton
Preceded by Sir Tudor Vaughan	Minister of the United Kingdom to Sweden; 1931–1934	Succeeded by Michael Palairet
Preceded by Francis Humphrys	Ambassador of the United Kingdom to Iraq; 1935–1938	Succeeded by Maurice Peterson
Preceded by Sir Hughe Knatchbull-Hugessen	Ambassador of the United Kingdom to China; 1938–1942	Succeeded by Sir Horace James Seymour
Preceded by Hon. Sir Stafford Cripps	Ambassador of the United Kingdom to the Soviet Union; 1942–1946	Succeeded by Sir Maurice Peterson
Preceded by The Earl of Halifax	Ambassador of the United Kingdom to the United States; 1946–1948	Succeeded by Oliver Franks
Peerage of the United Kingdom
New creation	Baron Inverchapel; 1946–1951	Extinct
