= Marie-Noële Kelly =

- Born: Renée Octavie Marie-Noële Jourda de Vaux; 25 December 1901; Belgium
- Died: 22 February 1995 (aged 93); London, England
- Occupations: Hostess; Traveler
- Years active: 1930s–1990s
- Spouse: David Kelly (m. 1929; died 1959)
- Children: 2

Renée Octavie Ghislaine Marie-Noële Kelly, Lady Kelly (née Jourda de Vaux; 25 December 1901 – 22 February 1995) was a Belgian-born English hostess and traveler. She was posted abroad to Sweden, Egypt, Argentina, Switzerland, Turkey and the Soviet Union as the wife of David Kelly, the Head of Chancery, later Ambassador there. Kelly travelled widely throughout her life and published several books Turkish Delights, Mirror to Russia, Picture Book of Russia and This Delicious Land Portugal. She wrote about her travels in Country Life magazine and the London Evening Standard newspaper.

== Early life ==
On 25 December 1901, Marie-Noelle Kelly was born in Belgium into an aristocratic family. She was the eldest of three daughters of Charles de Jourda de Vaux, comte de Vaux, whose ancestors emigrated from France during the French Revolution. Baron George Snoy, the author of a series of travel guides in the 1860s and traveller, was Kelly's maternal grandfather. Her ancestors on her father's side were Maréchal Charles Noël de Jourda, comte de Vaux, who conquered Corsica for Louis XV and planned an invasion of England. Kelly was brought up as a devout Roman Catholic, and was first educated at home by her father, who gave his daughters a high standard of education for the era, teaching them classics, English and French literature. Kelly was then educated at a convent school in Brussels and at the Priory of Our Lady of Good Counsel in Haywards Heath, Sussex, where her mother's sister was a nun. During the First World War, she stayed as a guest of Lloyd Tyrell-Kenyon, 4th Baron Kenyon, at his house in Shropshire.

== Career ==
In 1928 Marie-Noelle Kelly met David Kelly, a young widower and the Head of Chancery at the British Embassy, at a dinner party held at the house, close to Waterloo of her grandparents. The two were engaged in 1929 and were married that June. They had two children, one of whom is Laurence Kelly, a writer; she was stepmother to her husband's two children from his first marriage. Kelly was initiated into the complexities of diplomatic life by Rose Leveson-Gower, Countess Granville. In the 1930s, her husband's postings overseas meant she was first based in Stockholm, Sweden and then in Cairo, Egypt following her husband being recalled to London. Kelly was later based in Buenos Aires, Argentina and Bern, Switzerland during the Second World War. In Buenos Aires, she was part of the British community which raised £3 million in goods and provisions helping towards the war effort. Kelly became Lady Kelly when her husband was made KCMG in 1942, and was later made a Dame of Honour of the Knights of Malta.

In 1946, they were posted to Ankara, Turkey and, upon the suggestion of Süreyya Ağaoğlu, Turkey's first woman barrister, gave a series of widely publicised public lectures that were attended by several wives of ministers. Lady Kelly and her husband attracted positive press coverage that enhanced the confidence of the Anglo-Turkish alliance, and they made contact with several provincial governors. In 1949, she moved to Moscow in the Soviet Union for three years in an era where the country had severe restrictions imposed on diplomats; she and her husband were given permission for wider travel experiences than their colleagues.

Two years later, Kelly published the travel book Turkish Delights, which included descriptions of several hitherto unseen Byzantine and Turkish monuments. She used her skills as a hostess at a number of sorties in Moscow, and went on expeditions to the ancient European Russia provincial cities (but not to the excluded Central Asiatic Russia and Southern Russia) such as Kyiv that was closed to diplomats for half a decade. Her experiences formed the basis of the 1952 book Mirror to Russia in a time when the Soviet Union was a mystery to the (then) outside world, as well as a Book of Russia showing her own photographs.

The Kellys left Moscow in 1951 when her husband retired from the Foreign Office; she then wrote a series of articles, describing her travels, for Country Life magazine and the London Evening Standard newspaper. Kelly wrote the book This Delicious Land Portugal in 1956, and, four years later, her autobiography, Dawn to Dusk. She began travelling widely again when in 1955 her husband was appointed chair the British Council. Kelly maintained an 18th-century Georgian House in Inch, County Wexford, Ireland, and upon the death of her husband maintained a cottage there. She mostly resided in a grand and elegant flat spanning the upper floors of two houses in Carlyle Square in Chelsea, London, and continued to hold dinners and parties for friends, relatives, writers and diplomats to the end.

She died on 22 February 1995 in London. Following a memorial mass held at the Church of the Holy Redeemer in Cheyne Row, Chelsea on 6 April, she was buried in County Wexford. A series of four photographs of Lady Kelly, shown with her family, is held by the National Portrait Gallery, London.
