= David Kelly (diplomat) =

British diplomat (1891–1959)

Sir David Victor Kelly GCMG MC (14 September 1891 – 27 March 1959) was a British diplomat who was Minister to Switzerland and Ambassador to Argentina, Turkey, and the Soviet Union.

== Education ==
Kelly was educated at St Paul's School, London, and Magdalen College, Oxford, where he was a demy (scholar) and gained a first class degree in modern history in 1913.

== Career ==
Kelly passed the entrance examination for the Foreign Office in 1914 but on the outbreak of the First World War he volunteered for the army and was commissioned in the Leicestershire Regiment. He was brigade intelligence officer for the 110th Infantry Brigade (formed from Leicestershire Regiment battalions and known as the Leicester Tigers) from 1915. He was awarded the Military Cross in 1917.

After the war Kelly joined the Diplomatic Service and served in Buenos Aires, Lisbon, Mexico, Brussels, Stockholm and Cairo. He was Minister to Switzerland 1940–42 followed by appointments as Ambassador to Argentina 1942–46, to Turkey 1946–49 and to the Soviet Union 1949–51. He was appointed a Companion of the Order of St Michael and St George (CMG) in the King's Birthday Honours of 1935, promoted to Knight Commander (KCMG) in the Birthday Honours of 1942 on his appointment to Argentina, and to Knight Grand Cross (GCMG) in the New Year Honours of 1950. He was also made a Knight of Malta in 1954.

== Family ==
In 1920, while serving in Buenos Aires, Kelly met and married Isabel Adela Mills. They had a son and a daughter, but she died in 1927. In 1929 he married his second wife, Marie-Noële de Jourda de Vaux, who as Lady Kelly became "a diplomatic hostess, traveler and writer ... one of the grandes dames of British diplomacy ... [who] presided with great panache over embassies in Bern, Buenos Aires and Ankara" As Marie Noele Kelly she wrote five books including her autobiography, Dawn to Dusk (Hutchinson, London, 1960) with a preface by Rebecca West, a close friend. They had two sons, one being the writer Laurence Kelly, and she survived her husband by 35 years until her death in 1995.

== Portrayal ==
In the 1969 film Battle of Britain, Kelly was played by Ralph Richardson, in one of the film's memorable scenes, outwitting Curt Jurgens' Baron Von Richter. He was also portrayed in the Argentine film "Miss Mary (1986 film), in a scene receiving the donation of an ambulance for the British Army.

== Publications ==
- 39 Months with the "Tigers", 1915–1918, Ernest Benn, London, 1930
- The Ruling Few : or, the Human Background to Diplomacy, Hollis & Carter, London, 1952
- Beyond the Iron Curtain, Hollis & Carter, London, 1954
- The Hungry Sheep : a Discussion of Modern Civilisation, Hollis & Carter, London, 1955
- El Poder Detrás del Trono (The Power Behind the Throne), Ediciones Coyoacán, Buenos Aires, 1962

== Bibliography ==
- KELLY, Sir David (Victor), Who Was Who, A & C Black, 1920–2008; online edn, Oxford University Press, Dec 2007, accessed 19 July 2012
- Neville Wylie, Kelly, Sir David Victor (1891–1959), Oxford Dictionary of National Biography, Oxford University Press, 2004; online edn, Jan 2008, accessed 19 July 2012
- Sir David Kelly (obituary), The Times, London, 24 February 1995, page 21
- Obituary – An Outspoken Envoy At Moscow – Sir David Kelly, The Glasgow Herald, 28 March 1959, page 6

Diplomatic posts
Preceded by Sir George Warner	Envoy Extraordinary and Minister Plenipotentiary at Berne; 1940–1942	Succeeded by Sir Clifford Norton
Preceded by Sir Esmond Ovey	Ambassador Extraordinary and Plenipotentiary at Buenos Aires; 1942–1946	Succeeded by Sir Reginald Leeper
Preceded by Sir Maurice Peterson	Ambassador Extraordinary and Plenipotentiary at Angora; 1946–1949	Succeeded by Sir Noel Charles
Preceded by Sir Maurice Peterson	Ambassador Extraordinary and Plenipotentiary at Moscow; 1949–1951	Succeeded by Sir Alvary Gascoigne
