= Valentin Berezhkov =

Diplomat and translator for Joseph Stalin

- Валенти́н Миха́йлович Бережко́в
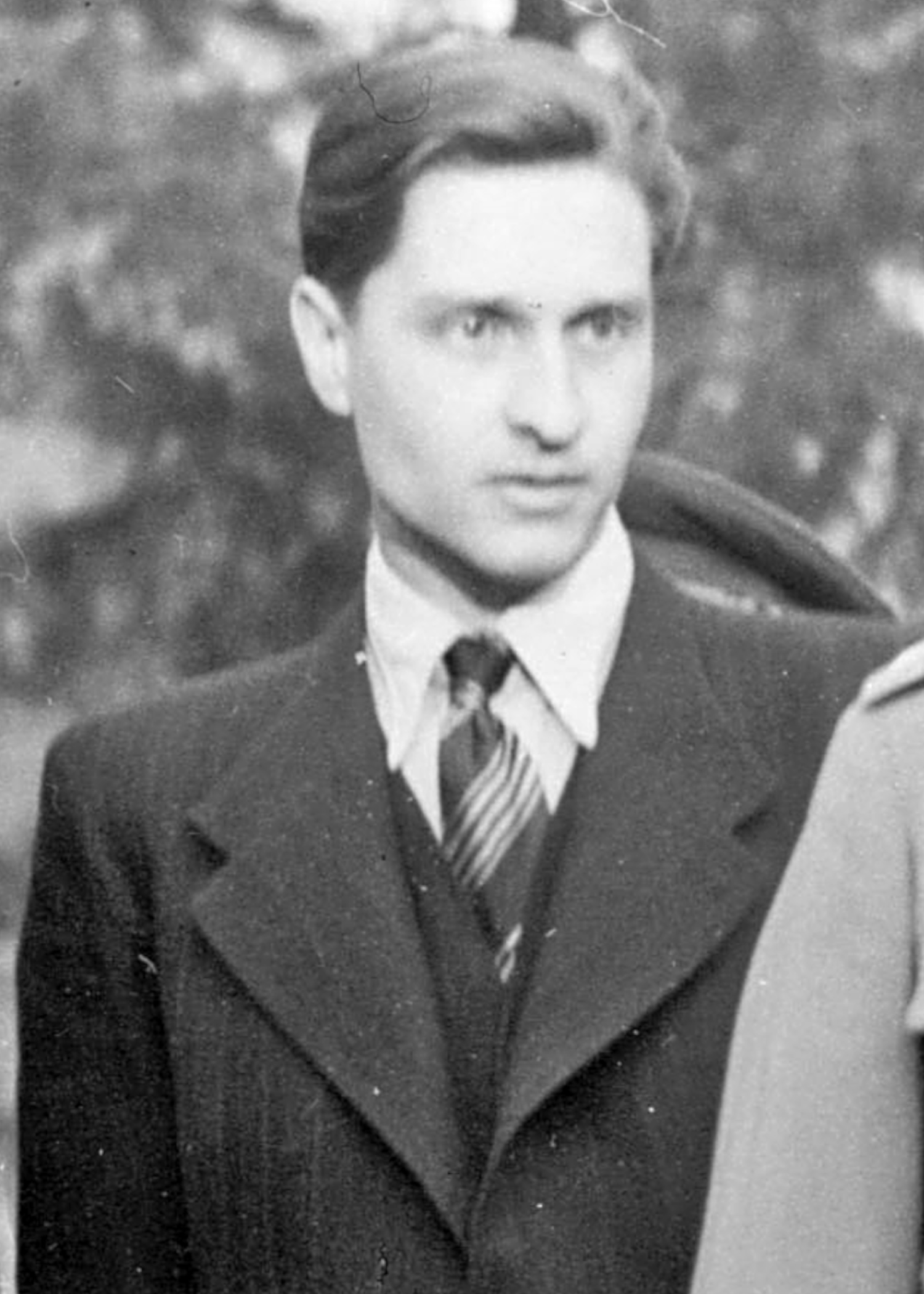
- Born: July 2, 1916; Petrograd
- Died: November 20, 1998 (aged 82); Claremont, California
- Awards: Order of the Red Star; Order of the Red Banner of Labour; Order of Friendship of Peoples

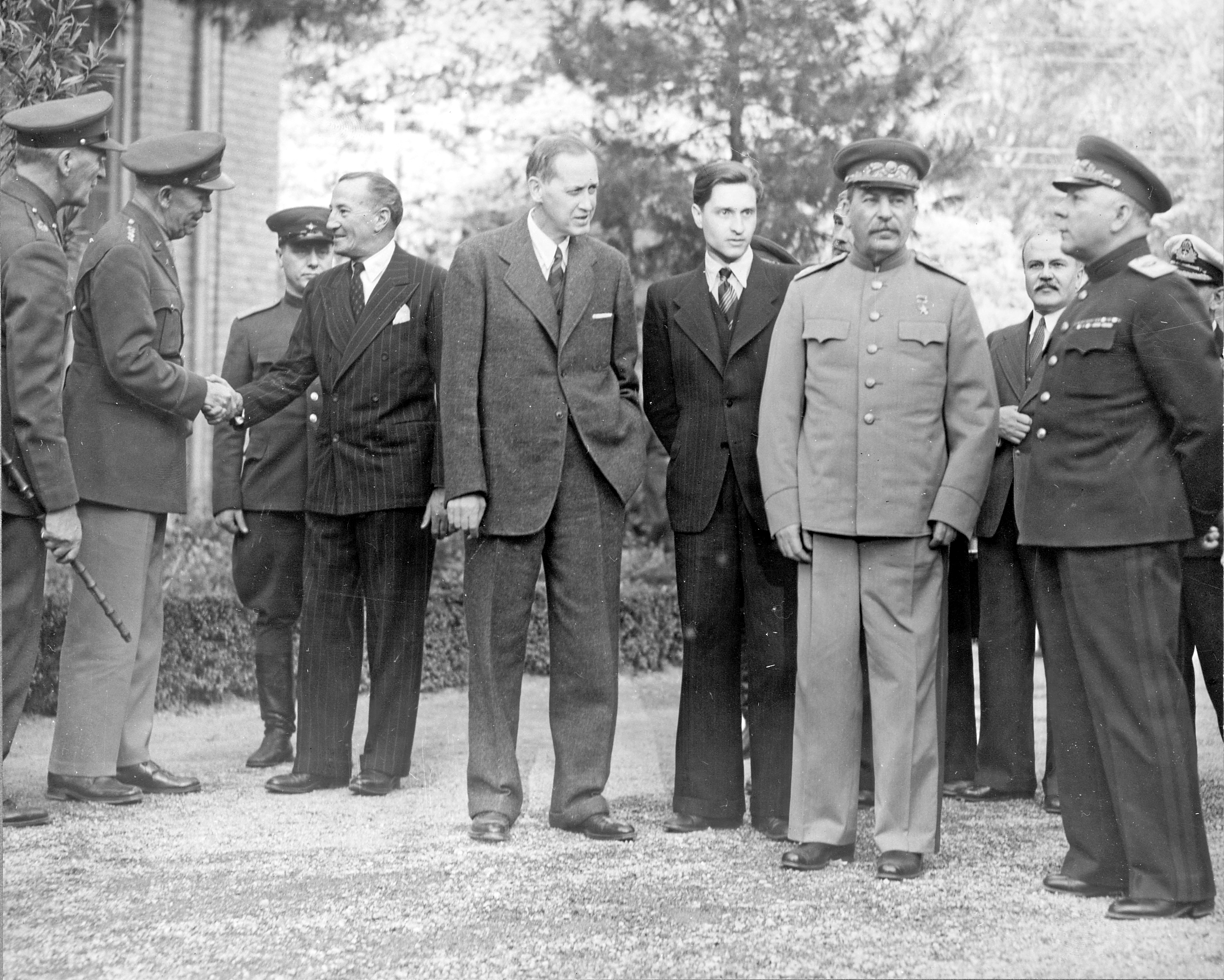
Tehran Conference. From right to left: Vyacheslav Molotov, Josef Stalin, Valentin Berezhkov, Harry Hopkins, General Sir Archibald Clark Keer, and George C. Marshall.

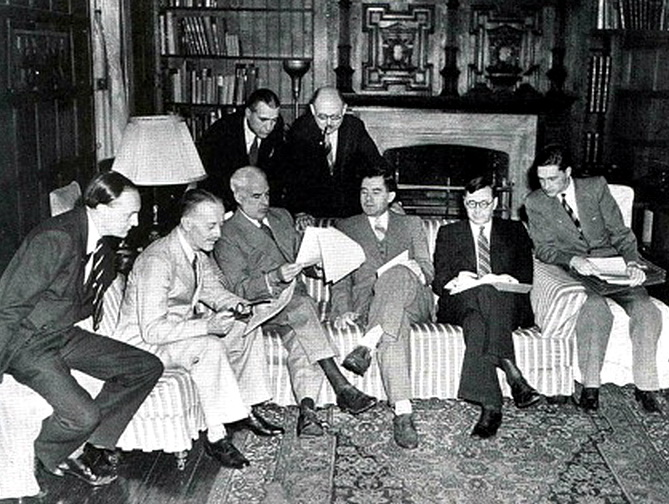
Informal meeting in the Study at Dumbarton Oaks Conference. Seated (L–R): Peter Loxley, Alexander Cadogan, Edward R. Stettinius Jr., Andrei Gromyko, Arkady Sobolev, Valentin M. Berezhkov. Standing (L–R): James Clement Dunn, Leo Pasvolsky.

Valentin Mikhailovich Berezhkov (2 July 1916 – 20 November 1998) was a Soviet diplomat, translator, interpreter, and journalist who served as the personal translator-referent to Joseph Stalin and Foreign Minister Vyacheslav Molotov during key World War II conferences, most notably at Tehran (1943), Yalta (1945), and Potsdam (1945). After the war, he transitioned to journalism, becoming deputy chief editor of The New Times, and later the founding editor of USA , Economics, Politics, Ideology. Berezhkov returned to diplomacy in the 1970's as the First Secretary at the Soviet Embassy in Washington. After the dissolution of the Soviet Union, he moved to the United States, where he taught on Russian American affairs at institutions including Stanford University and Occidental College. In 1992, he went to work at the Monterey Institute of International Studies, serving there until his death several years later. He published several memoirs, including At Stalin's Side, and died in Claremont, California, in 1998.
