= Tehran Conference =

1943 meeting of the Allied leaders

Tehran Conference "Eureka"
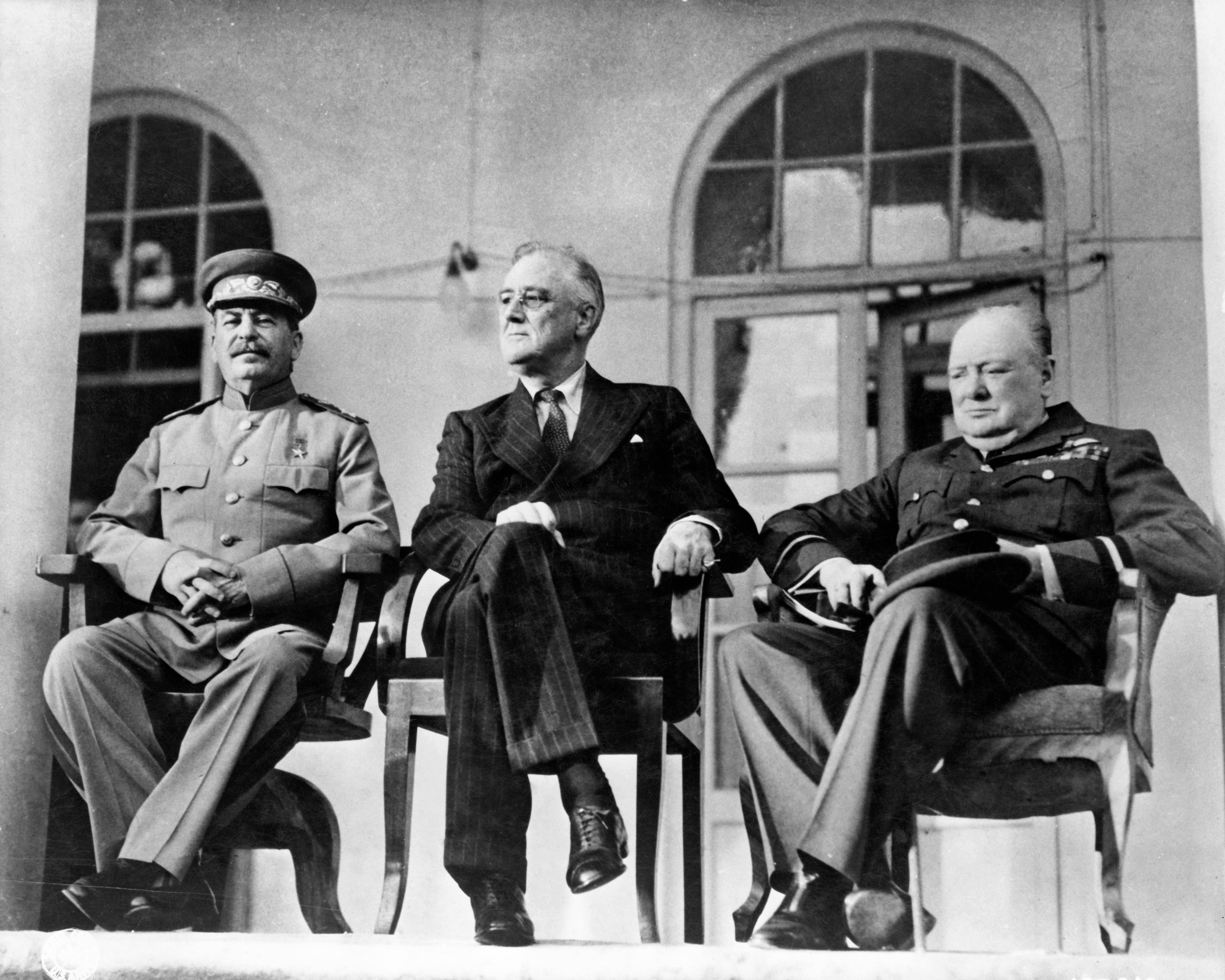
- Left-to-right: Soviet leader Joseph Stalin, American president Franklin D. Roosevelt, British prime minister Winston Churchill
- Host country: Imperial State of Iran
- Date: 28 November – 1 December 1943
- Cities: Tehran, Iran
- Venues: Embassy of the Soviet Union
- Participants: Soviet Union; United States; United Kingdom
- Precedes: Yalta Conference

Key points
- Consensus to open a second front against Nazi Germany by 1 June 1944

The Tehran Conference (codenamed Eureka) was a strategy meeting of the Allies of World War II, held between Joseph Stalin, Franklin D. Roosevelt, and Winston Churchill from 28 November to 1 December 1943. It was the first of the Allied World War II conferences involving the "Big Three" (the Soviet Union, the United States, and the United Kingdom) and took place at the Soviet embassy in Tehran more than two years after the Anglo-Soviet invasion of Iran. The meeting occurred shortly after the Cairo Conference was held in Egypt for a discussion between the United States, the United Kingdom, and China from 22 to 26 November 1943. The Big Three would not meet again until 1945, when the Yalta Conference was held in Crimea from 4 to 11 February and the Potsdam Conference was held in Allied-occupied Germany from 17 July to August 2. Notably, President Franklin D. Roosevelt arrived on the USS Iowa.

Although the three leaders arrived in Tehran with differing objectives, the main outcome of the meeting was a British and American commitment to opening a second front against Nazi Germany, thereby forcing it to pull military assets away from the Eastern Front with the Soviets. In addition to this decision, the Tehran Conference also addressed: the Big Three's relations with Turkey and Iran, as the former was being pressed to enter the conflict and the latter was under Allied occupation; operations in Yugoslavia and against Japan; and the envisaged settlement following the expected defeat of the Axis powers. A separate contract also saw the Big Three pledge to recognize Iranian independence.

== Background ==
Once the German-Soviet War broke out on June 22, 1941, Churchill offered assistance to the Soviets, and an agreement to that effect was signed on 12 July 1941. However, Churchill, in a spoken radio transmission announcing the alliance with the Soviets, reminded listeners that the alliance would not change his stance against communism.

Delegations had traveled between London and Moscow to arrange the implementation of that support, and when the United States joined the war on December 8, 1941, the delegations met in Washington as well. A Combined Chiefs of Staff committee was created to co-ordinate British and American operations and their support to the Soviets. The consequences of a global war, the absence of a unified Allied strategy, and the complexity of allocating resources between Europe and Asia had not yet been sorted out, which soon gave rise to mutual suspicions between the Western Allies and the Soviet Union. There was the question of opening a second front to alleviate the German pressure on the Soviet Red Army on the Eastern Front, the question of mutual assistance (since both the United Kingdom and the Soviet Union were looking towards the United States for credit and material support, there was tension between the United States and Britain since the Americans had no desire to prop up the British Empire in the event of an Allied victory). Also, neither the United States nor the United Kingdom was prepared to give Stalin a free hand in Eastern Europe, and there was no common policy on how to deal with Germany after the war. Communications regarding those matters between Churchill, Roosevelt, and Stalin took place by telegrams and via emissaries, but it was evident that direct negotiations were urgently needed.

Stalin was reluctant to leave Moscow and unwilling to risk journeys by air. He went by train to Baku, and then by air. There were two planes at Baku; one for him piloted by a colonel-general and one for officials piloted by a colonel, but Stalin chose the colonel's aircraft, saying "Colonel-Generals don't often pilot aircraft".

Roosevelt was physically disabled and found travel difficult. Churchill was an avid traveller and, as part of an ongoing series of wartime conferences, had already met with Roosevelt five times in North America and twice in Africa and had also held two prior meetings with Stalin in Moscow. To arrange the urgently needed meeting, Roosevelt tried to persuade Stalin to travel to Cairo. Stalin turned down the offer and also offers to meet in Baghdad or Basra. He finally agreed to meet in Tehran in November 1943. Iran was a neutral country but was nevertheless invaded jointly by the United Kingdom and the Soviet Union in August 1941.

== Proceedings ==
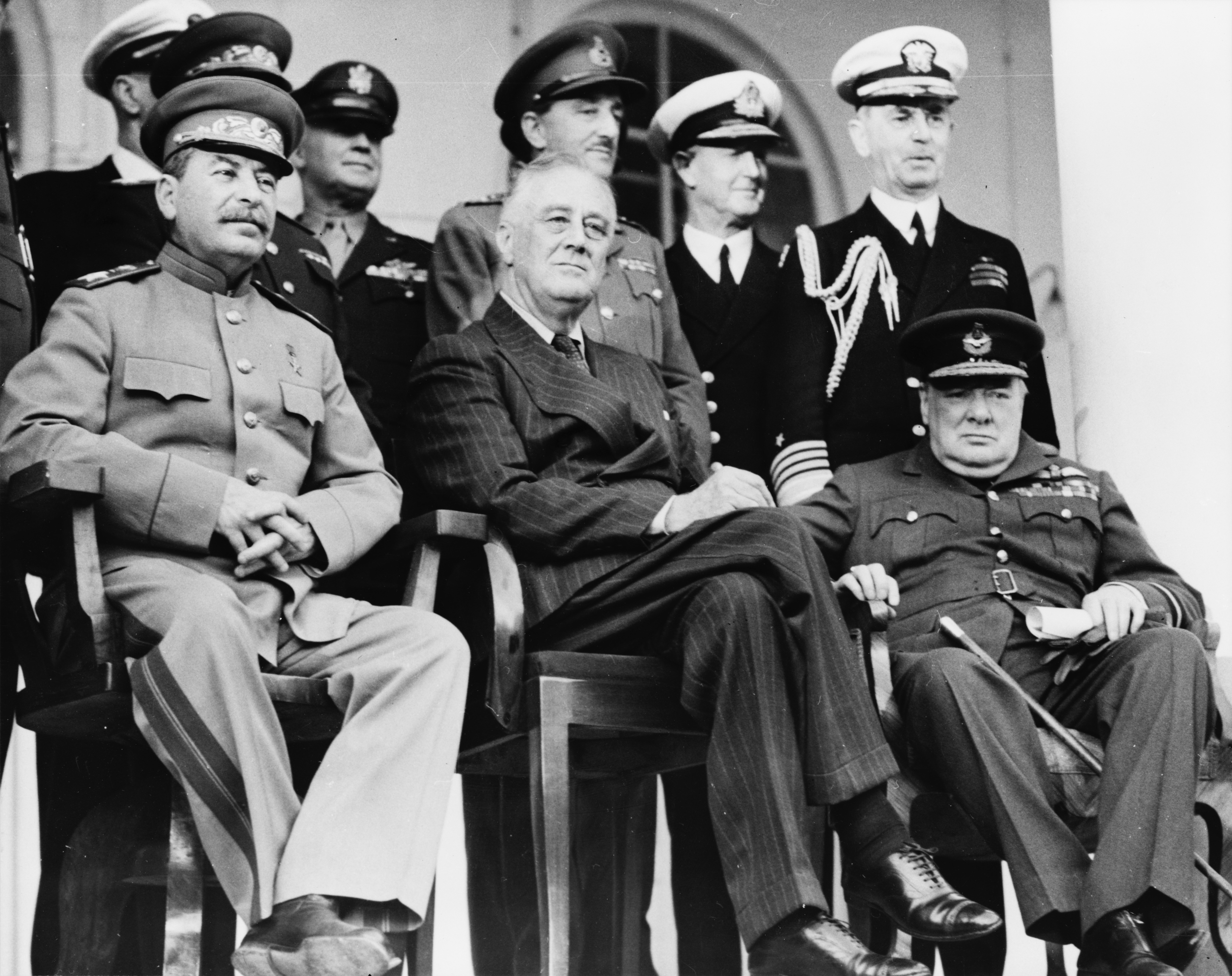
Tehran, Iran, Dec. 1943—Front row: Marshal Stalin, President Roosevelt, Prime Minister Churchill on the portico of the Soviet Embassy—Back row: General H.H. Arnold, Chief of the U.S. Army Air Force; General Alan Brooke, Chief of the Imperial General Staff; Admiral Cunningham, First Sea Lord; Admiral William Leahy, Chief of Staff to President Roosevelt, during the Tehran Conference Joseph Stalin kisses the "Sword of Stalingrad" during the Tehran Conference, Iran, 1943. Valentin Berezhkov, Stalin's translator, second man on right side.

The conference was to convene at 16:00 on 28 November 1943. Stalin had arrived well before, followed by Roosevelt, who was brought in his wheelchair from his accommodation adjacent to the venue. Roosevelt, who had traveled 11,000 kilometres (7,000 miles) to attend and whose health was already deteriorating, was met by Stalin. This was the first time that they had met. Churchill, walking with his general staff from their accommodations nearby, arrived half an hour later. According to Roosevelt's interpreter, Charles Bohlen, Roosevelt was accompanied by Harry Hopkins, who had served as Roosevelt's personal emissary to Churchill, and W. Averell Harriman, the U.S. Ambassador to the Soviet Union. Stalin was accompanied by Soviet Minister of Foreign Affairs Vyacheslav Molotov and military leader Kliment Voroshilov. Churchill brought Foreign Secretary Anthony Eden his CGS Alanbrooke, chief military assistant Hastings Ismay plus Dill, Cunningham, Portal, Boyle, and his interpreter Arthur Birse. Three Western women attended: Churchill's daughter Sarah, Averell Harriman's daughter Kathleen and Roosevelt's daughter Anna Boettiger.

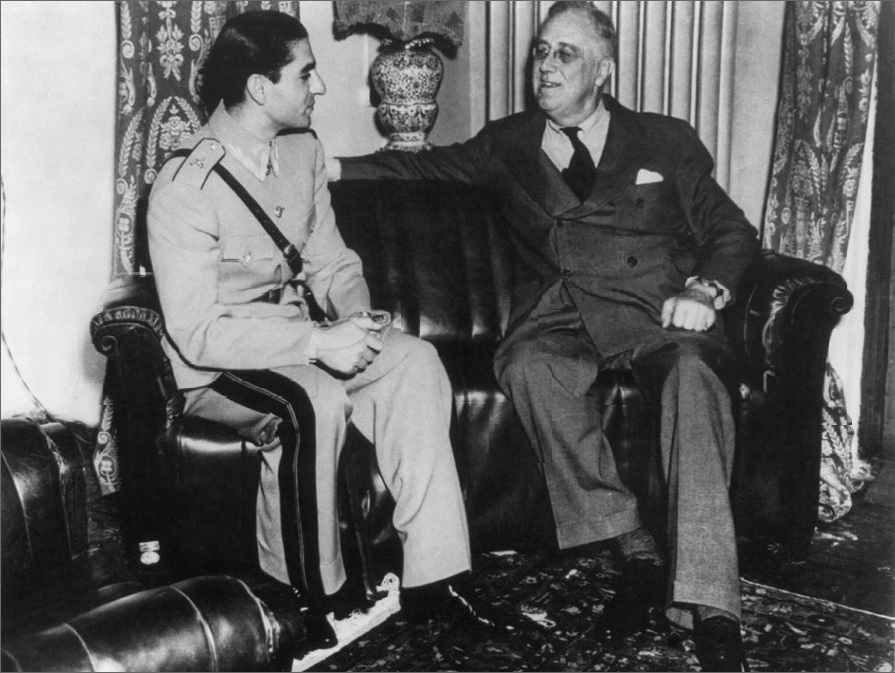
The Shah of Iran, shortly after his father's forced abdication during the Anglo-Soviet Invasion of Iran, meeting with American president Franklin D. Roosevelt during the Conference

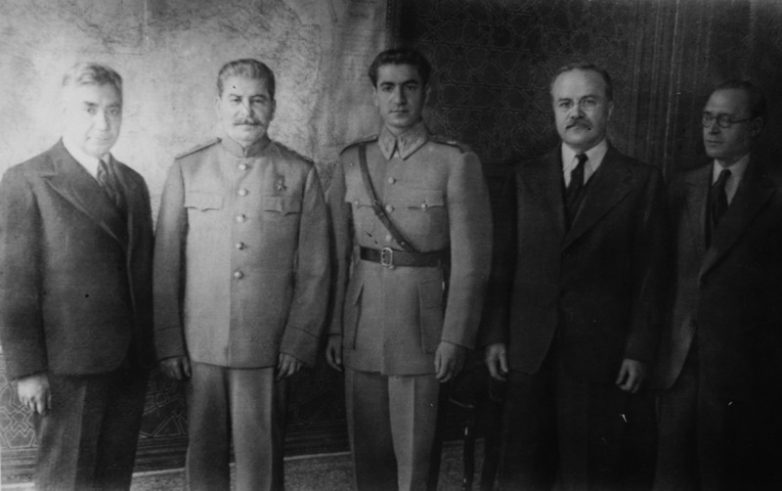
The Shah of Iran (center), pictured to the right of Joseph Stalin at the Tehran Conference (1943)

Footage from the Cairo and Tehran conferences

As Stalin had been advocating for a second front since 1941, he was very pleased and felt that he had accomplished his principal goal for the meeting. Moving on, Stalin agreed to enter the war against Japan once Germany was defeated:

Stalin pressed for a revision of Poland's eastern border with the Soviet Union to match the line set by British Foreign Secretary Lord Curzon in 1920. In order to compensate Poland for the resulting loss of territory, the three leaders agreed to move the German-Polish border to the Oder and Neisse rivers. This decision was not formally ratified, however, until the Potsdam Conference of 1945.

The leaders then turned to the conditions under which the Western Allies would open a new front by invading northern France (Operation Overlord), as Stalin had pressed them to do since 1941. Until then, Churchill had advocated the expansion of joint operations of British, American, and Commonwealth forces in the Mediterranean, as opening a new western front had been physically impossible because of a lack of existing shipping routes. That left the Mediterranean and Italy as viable goals for 1943. It was agreed Operation Overlord would be launched by American and British forces by May 1944 and that Stalin would support the Allies with a concurrent major offensive on Germany's eastern front (Operation Bagration) to divert German forces from northern France.

Additional offensives were also discussed to complement the undertaking of Operation Overlord, including the possible allied invasion of southern France prior to the landings at Normandy with the goal of drawing German forces away from the northern beaches and even a possible strike at the northern tip of the Adriatic to circumvent the Alps and drive towards Vienna. Either plan would have relied on Allied divisions engaged against the German Army in Italy around the time of the conference.

Churchill argued for the invasion of Italy in 1943, then Overlord in 1944, on the basis that Overlord was physically impossible in 1943 for lack of shipping and that it would be unthinkable to do anything important until it could be launched. Churchill successfully proposed to Stalin a westward movement of Poland, which Stalin accepted. It gave the Poles industrialized German land to the west but took marshlands to the east. It also provided a territorial buffer to the Soviet Union against invasion. Churchill's plan involved a border along the Oder and the Neisse, which he views to give Poland a fair compensation for the Eastern Borderlands.

=== Discussion on Iran and Turkey ===
Iran and Turkey were discussed in detail. Roosevelt, Churchill, and Stalin all agreed to support the Iranian government, as addressed in the following declaration:

The Three Governments realize that the war has caused special economic difficulties for Iran, and they all agreed that they will continue to make available to the Government of Iran such economic assistance as may be possible, having regard to the heavy demands made upon them by their world-wide military operations, and to the world-wide shortage of transport, raw materials, and supplies for civilian consumption.

In addition, the Soviets pledged support to Turkey if it entered the war. Roosevelt, Churchill and Stalin agreed that it would also be most desirable if Turkey entered on the Allies' side before the year was out. In order to encourage Turkey to act as soon as possible, they agreed to make "the offer to take Crete and the Dodecanese islands because they are rather close to Turkey."

=== Dinner meeting ===
Before the Tripartite Dinner Meeting of 29 November 1943 at the Conference, Churchill presented Stalin with a specially commissioned ceremonial sword (the "Sword of Stalingrad," made in Sheffield), as a gift from King George VI to the citizens of Stalingrad and the Soviet people, commemorating the Soviet victory at Stalingrad. When Stalin received the sheathed sword, he took it with both hands, and kissed the scabbard. Stalin held the sword by the sheathe and angled the pommel downwards, causing the sword to slide out of its scabbard and fall to the ground. He then handed it to Marshal Kliment Voroshilov.

"Without American machines the United Nations never could have won the war."

— Joseph Stalin, during the dinner at the Tehran Conference.

Stalin proposed executing 50,000 to 100,000 German officers so that Germany could not plan another war. Roosevelt, believing that Stalin was not serious, joked that "maybe 49,000 would be enough." Churchill, however, was outraged and denounced "the cold-blooded execution of soldiers who fought for their country." He said that only war criminals should be put on trial in accordance with the Moscow Document, which he had written. He stormed out of the room but was brought back in by Stalin, who said he was joking. Churchill was glad Stalin had relented but thought that Stalin had been testing the waters.

== Military decisions ==
1. The Yugoslav Partisans would be supported by supplies, equipment, and commando operations.
2. The leaders stated that it would be desirable for Turkey to join the war on the side of the Allies before the end of the year.
3. The leaders took note of Stalin's statement that if Turkey found herself at war with Germany and, as a result, Bulgaria declared war on or attacked Turkey, the Soviet Union would immediately be at war with Bulgaria. The Conference noted that this could be mentioned in the forthcoming negotiations to bring Turkey into the war.
4. The cross-channel invasion of France (Operation Overlord) would be launched during May 1944, in conjunction with an operation against southern France (Operation Dragoon). The latter operation would be undertaken in as great a strength as the availability of landing-craft permitted. The Conference further took note of Stalin's statement that the Soviet forces would launch an offensive (Operation Bagration) about the same time with the object of preventing the German forces from transferring from the Eastern Front to the Western Front. Operation Overlord was to be on 1 June, but the moon and tides required to be delayed to 5 June.
5. The leaders agreed for the military staff of the three powers to keep in close contact with one another in regard to the impending operations in Europe. In particular, a cover plan to mislead the enemy about the operations was to be concocted by the staff concerned.

=== Political decisions ===
Stalin and Churchill discussed the future borders of Poland, stating a variant of the so-called Curzon Line for the eastern border, supporting the annexation of the rest by the USSR, proposing annexation of German territories in the north and west to Poland instead. Roosevelt had asked to be excused from any discussion of Poland, stating it as a matter for the effects of any decision on Polish voters in the US and the upcoming 1944 election. The decisions were not officially ratified until the Yalta Conference and Potsdam Conference in 1945. Soon before the conference, the USSR unilaterally withdrew recognition of the Polish government-in-exile, still recognized by the UK and the US and the negotiations were made covertly without their involvement.

During the negotiations, Roosevelt had demanded that the Republics of Lithuania, Latvia, and Estonia would be deemed as part of the Soviet Union only after the citizens 'voted' on the action. Roosevelt secured formal 'agreement', however, Stalin would not consent to any international control over the elections and stated that all issues would have to be resolved 'in accordance with the Soviet Constitution'. In the end, after Soviet occupation, the areas were subjected in accordance with Soviet plans. The US, for example, in principle never officially recognised.

== Results ==
The Yugoslav Partisans were given full Allied support, and Allied support to the Yugoslav Chetniks was halted. (They were believed to be cooperating with the occupying Italians and Germans rather than fighting them; see Yugoslavia and the Allies). The communist Partisans under Josip Broz Tito took power in Yugoslavia as the Germans gradually retreated from the Balkans in 1944 and 1945.

Turkish President İsmet İnönü conferred with Roosevelt and Churchill at the Cairo Conference in November 1943 and promised to enter the war when his country had become fully armed. By August 1944, Turkey broke off relations with Germany. In February 1945, Turkey declared war on Germany and Japan, which may have been a symbolic move that allowed Turkey to join the future United Nations.

=== Operation Overlord ===
Roosevelt and Stalin spent much of the conference to try to convince Churchill to commit to an invasion of France and finally succeeded on 30 November, when Roosevelt announced at lunch that they would be launching the invasion in May 1944. That pleased Stalin, who had been pressing his allies to open a new front in the west to alleviate some pressure on his troops. That decision may be the most critical to come out of this conference, as the desired effect of the relief of Soviet troops was achieved and led to a Soviet rally and advance toward Germany, a tide that Hitler could not stem.

=== United Nations ===
The Tehran Conference also served as one of the first conversations surrounding the formation of the United Nations. Roosevelt first introduced Stalin to the idea of an international organization comprising all nation states, a venue for the resolution of common issues, and a check against international aggressors. With Germany having thrust the world into chaos for the second time in as many generations, the three world leaders all agreed that something must be done to prevent a similar occurrence.

=== Division of Germany ===
There was a shared view among the participants that a postwar division of Germany was necessary, with the sides differing on the number of divisions needed to neutralize her ability to wage war. The numbers that were proposed varied widely and never came to fruition, but the powers would effectively divide modern Germany into two parts until the end of the Cold War. During one dinner, Churchill questioned Stalin on his postwar territorial ambitions. Stalin replied, "There is no need to speak at this present time about any Soviet Desires, but when the time comes we will speak."

=== Soviet entry to the Pacific War ===
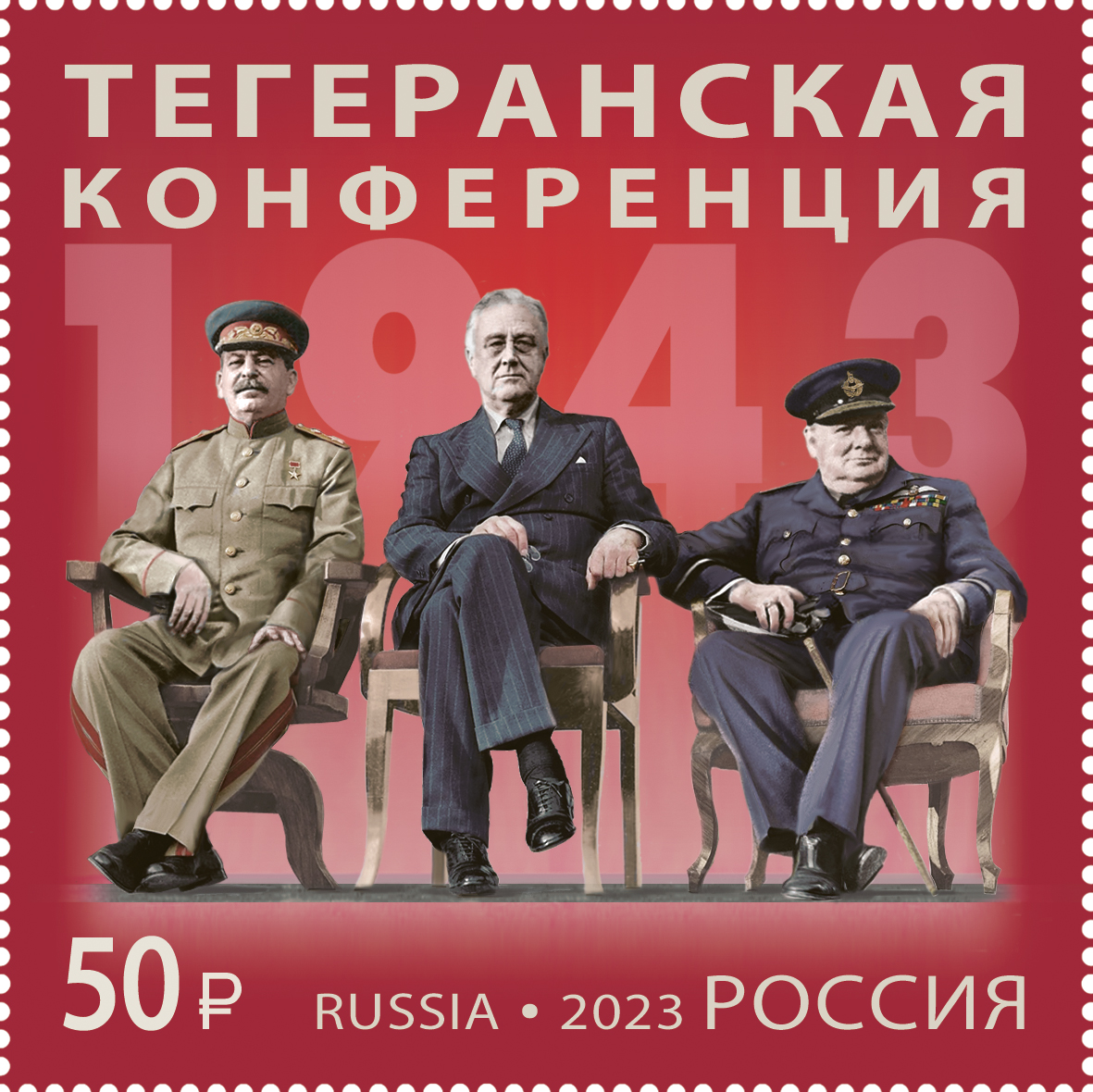
2023 Russian postal stamp dedicated to the Tehran Conference

On 29 November, Roosevelt asked Stalin five questions about data and intelligence, relating to Japanese and Siberian ports and about air bases in the Maritime Provinces for up to 1,000 heavy bombers. On 2 February, Stalin told the American ambassador that America could operate 1,000 bombers from Siberia after the Soviet Union had declared war on Japan (Vladivostok is in the Russian Far East, not Siberia).

== Alleged assassination plot ==
According to Soviet reports, German agents planned to kill the Big Three leaders at the Tehran Conference, but called off the assassination while it was still in the planning stage. The NKVD, the USSR's counterintelligence unit, first notified Mike Reilly, Roosevelt's chief of security, of the suspected assassination plot several days before Roosevelt's arrival in Tehran. Reilly had gone to Tehran several days early to evaluate security concerns and explore potential routes from Cairo to Tehran. Just before Reilly returned to Cairo, the NKVD informed him that dozens of Germans had been dropped into Tehran by parachute the day before. The NKVD suspected German agents were planning to kill the Big Three leaders at the Tehran Conference.

When housing accommodations for the meeting were originally discussed, both Stalin and Churchill had extended invitations to Roosevelt, asking him to stay with them during the meeting. However, Roosevelt wanted to avoid the appearance of choosing one ally over another and decided it was important to stay at the American legation to remain independent. Roosevelt arrived in Tehran on 27 November 1943 and settled into the American legation. Close to midnight, Vyacheslav Molotov, Stalin's top aide, summoned Archibald Clark-Kerr (the British ambassador in the Soviet Union) and Averell Harriman (the American ambassador in the Soviet Union) to the Soviet embassy, warning them of an assassination plot against Roosevelt, Churchill and Stalin. Molotov informed them several assassins had been apprehended, but reported additional assassins were at large and expressed concerns for President Roosevelt's safety. Molotov advised Roosevelt should be moved to the safety of the British or Soviet embassy.

Americans suspected Stalin had fabricated the assassination plot as an excuse to have Roosevelt moved to the Soviet embassy. Mike Reilly, Roosevelt's chief of Secret Service, advised him to move to either the Soviet or British embassies for his safety. One of the underlying factors influencing their decision was the distance Churchill and Stalin would need to travel for meetings at the American legation. Harriman reminded the President that the Americans would be held responsible if Stalin or Churchill were assassinated while traveling to visit Roosevelt all the way across the city. Earlier that day, Molotov had agreed to hold all meetings at the American legation because traveling was difficult for Roosevelt. The timing of Molotov announcing an assassination plot later that night aroused suspicion that his motives were to keep Stalin safely within the guarded walls of the Soviet embassy. Harriman doubted the existence of an assassination plot, but urged the President to relocate to avoid the perception of putting Churchill and Stalin in danger. Roosevelt did not believe there was a credible threat of assassination, but agreed to the move so he could be closer to Stalin and Churchill. Living in the Soviet embassy also allowed Roosevelt to gain more direct access to Stalin and build his trust. Stalin liked having Roosevelt in the embassy because it eliminated the need to travel outside the compound and it allowed him to spy on Roosevelt more easily. The Soviet embassy was guarded by thousands of secret police and located adjacent to the British embassy, which allowed the Big Three to meet securely.

After the Tehran Conference ended, Harriman asked Molotov whether there was really ever an assassination threat in Tehran. Molotov said that they knew about German agents in Tehran, but did not know of a specific assassination plot. Molotov's response minimized their assertions of an assassination plot, instead emphasizing that Stalin thought President Roosevelt would be safer at the Soviet embassy. American and British intelligence reports generally dismissed the existence of this plot and Otto Skorzeny, the alleged leader of the operation, later claimed that Hitler had dismissed the idea as unworkable before planning had even begun. The topic continues to be a theme of certain Russian historians.

== See also ==
- List of Allied World War II conferences
- List of Soviet Union–United States summits
- History of the United Nations
- Teheran 43
- The Eagle Has Landed
