= Linda Kelly (author) =

English historian (1936–2019)

Linda Kelly (1 October 1936 – 12 January 2019) was an English historian and biographer, the author of ten books, whose specialised in the period of romanticism.

Born Linda McNair-Scott, she married the writer Laurence Kelly. Her books provided group biographies of writers, performers and politicians, linked through social and professional contacts in France and Britain over the period 1770–1840.

Kelly died on 12 January 2019, aged 82.

== Publications ==
- The Marvellous Boy: The Life and Myth of Thomas Chatterton (1971)
- The Young Romantics: Paris 1827-1837 (1976; 2nd edition 2003)
- The Kemble Era: John Philip Kemble, Sarah Siddons and the London Stage (1980)
- Women of the French Revolution (1989)
- Juniper Hall: An English Refuge from the French Revolution (1991)
- Richard Brinsley Sheridan. A Life (1997)
- Susanna, the Captain and the Castrato: Scenes from the Burney Salon, 1779-80 (2004)
- Ireland's Minstrel: A Life of Tom Moore: Poet, Patriot and Byron's Friend (2006)
- Holland House: a History of London's Most Celebrated Salon (2013)
- Talleyrand in London: The Master Diplomat's Last Mission (2017).
