= George Warner (rugby union) =

English rugby union player

- Born: 24 November 1989 (age 36) Bedford, England
- Height: 5 ft 11 in (180 cm)
- Weight: 92 kg (14 st 7 lb)

Rugby union career
- Position: Hooker
Senior career
Years	Team	Apps	(Points)
2008–2010	Leeds Carnegie		
2010 – present	Moseley RFC		

George Warner (born 24 November 1989 in Bedford, England) is a rugby union player who formerly played for Leeds Carnegie in the Guinness Premiership. From the 2010/11 season, he plays for Moseley in the RFU Championship.
