= George Robert Jebb =

British civil engineer

George Robert Jebb (1838–16 February 1927) was a civil engineer who lived in the United Kingdom. He was involved with railway and canal engineering, and became Vice-President of the Institution of Civil Engineers.

Born in 1838 in Baschurch, Shropshire, where his father John was stationmaster of Baschurch railway station, Jebb completed his engineering training as a student of Alexander Mackintosh, working on the lines of the former Shrewsbury and Chester Railway. He was subsequently appointed the Resident Engineer of the Wrexham and Minera Railway along with a number of other railway lines in Wales.

Jebb was later appointed as the Chief Engineer of the Shropshire Union Railways and Canal Company (for which he designed many of the docks and warehouses of Ellesmere Port) and of the Birmingham Canal Navigations and was a director of the Glyn Valley Tramway. He was involved with many other engineering projects around the world, such as planning the route of the railway between Lviv and Chernivtsi. Jebb was an officer of the London and North Western Railway through his Shropshire Union post, and was a friend and associate of the LNWR's Chief Mechanical Engineer Francis Webb; a LNWR Claughton Class locomotive, number 5930, was named G R Jebb after him. Although he became Vice-President of the ICE, he refused to be nominated as President and resigned in 1912, although in that year he did become President of the Smeatonian Society of Civil Engineers.

Jebb lived in Great Barr, Birmingham, during his later years. He was a keen amateur botanist and corresponded with several journals of the period on British flora: he was a particular authority on the flora of North Wales.

George Jebb died after a brief illness on 16 February 1927. He was the father of Reginald Jebb and the paternal grandfather of Reginald's son, the architect Philip Jebb.
