= George Warner (diplomat) =

British diplomat (1879–1978)

Sir George Warner KCVO CMG

British Envoy Extraordinary and Minister Plenipotentiary to Switzerland
- In office 1935–1940
- Preceded by: Sir Howard Kennard
- Succeeded by: Sir David Kelly

Personal details
- Born: 18 July 1879
- Died: 23 June 1978 (aged 98)
- Children: 3
- Education: Balliol College, Oxford
- Occupation: Diplomat and civil servant

Sir George Redston Warner (18 July 1879 – 23 June 1978) was a British diplomat who served as Envoy Extraordinary and Minister Plenipotentiary to Switzerland from 1935 to 1940.

== Early life and education ==
Warner was born on 18 July 1879, the eldest son of Lieutenant-Colonel Sir Joseph Warner. He was educated at Eton College and Balliol College, Oxford.

== Career ==
Warner entered the Foreign Office in 1903 before he transferred to the Diplomatic Service in 1906, and served as acting third secretary at Tangier until 1908. After ten years back in the Foreign Office, he was sent to Oslo as first secretary, a post he held from 1920 to 1921. He then returned to work at the Foreign Office, was promoted to counsellor in 1925, and rose to head of the Treaty Department where he remained from 1925 to 1935. In 1935, he was appointed Envoy Extraordinary and Minister Plenipotentiary at Berne, a post he held until 1940.

In 1940, he returned to London where he served as head of the Prisoner of War Department before he retired in 1941.

== Personal life and death ==
Warner married Margery Catherine Nicol in 1910 and they had three sons.

Warner died on 23 June 1978, aged 98.

== Honours ==
Warner was appointed Companion of the Order of St Michael and St George (CMG) in the 1927 New Years Honours. He was appointed Knight Commander of the Royal Victorian Order (KCVO) in the 1935 New Years Honours.

== See also ==
- Switzerland–United Kingdom relations

Diplomatic posts
Preceded by Sir Howard Kennard	British Envoy Extraordinary and Minister Plenipotentiary to Switzerland; 1935–1940	Succeeded by Sir David Kelly
