= 1966 New Year Honours =

British royal recognitions

The New Year Honours 1966 were appointments in many of the Commonwealth realms of Queen Elizabeth II to various orders and honours to reward and highlight good works by citizens of those countries. They were announced in supplements to the London Gazette of 31 December 1965 to celebrate the year passed and mark the beginning of 1966. At this time honours for Australians were awarded both in the United Kingdom honours, on the advice of the premiers of Australian states, and also in a separate Australia honours list.

The recipients of honours are displayed here as they were styled before their new honour, and arranged by honour, with classes (Knight, Knight Grand Cross, etc.) and then divisions (Military, Civil, etc.) as appropriate.

== United Kingdom and Colonies ==
=== Life Peer ===
Baroness

- Mary Danvers Stocks, Writer and Broadcaster, Formerly Principal of Westfield College in the University of London.

Barons

- Sir John (Jock) Middleton Campbell, Chairman, Booker Brothers, McConnell & Company Ltd. Chairman, Economic Development Committees for Building and for Civil Engineering.
- Sir John Scott Fulton, Vice-Chancellor, University of Sussex.
- Commander Sir (William) Stephen Richard King-Hall, President and Maker, Hansard Society for Parliamentary Government.
- Israel Moses Sieff, Chairman, Marks & Spencer, Ltd.

=== Privy Councillor ===
- Alice Martha Bacon, CBE, MP, Member of Parliament for Leeds, North-East, 1945–1955; and for Leeds, South-East since 1955. Minister of State, Home Office, since October 1964. Chairman of the Labour Party 1950; Member, National Executive Committee since 1941.
- John Freeman, MBE, British High Commissioner in India.
- The Honourable Paul Meernaa Caedwalla Hasluck, Minister for External Affairs, Commonwealth of Australia.
- The Honourable Sir William Henry Spooner, KCMG, MM, Lately Minister for National Development and Leader of the Government in the Senate, Commonwealth of Australia.

=== Knight Bachelor ===
- Alderman Charles William Allison, CBE, JP. For political and public services in Stockton-on-Tees.
- Ranulph Robert Maunsell Bacon, Assistant Commissioner, Metropolitan Police.
- Professor Ronald Gilbert Baskett, OBE, Director, National Institute for Research in Dairying, University of Reading.
- Douglas James Bell, CBE. Lately General Manager, Durgapur Steel Works, India.
- Alderman William James Bennett, CBE, JP, DL. For political and public services in Essex.
- Eric Albert Bingen, Chairman, Remploy, Ltd.
- William Neil Connor, Journalist.
- Geoffrey Sandford Cox, CBE, Editor, Independent Television News.
- Harry Walter Victor Crane, OBE, JP. For political services.
- Alderman George Brand Eddie, OBE, JP. For political and public services in Blackburn.
- Samuel Alexander Sadler Forster, CBE, Chairman, Industrial Estates Management Corporation for England.
- Arthur Ernest Gough. For political and public services in Cardiff.
- Claude Herbert Grundy, lately Senior Master, Queen's Bench Division, Supreme Court of Judicature.
- Ludwig Guttmann, CBE, MD, FRCS. For services to those suffering from paraplegia.
- Captain Basil Henry Liddell Hart, Military Historian.
- Joseph Anthony Hunt, MBE. For services to Technical Education.
- Daniel Thomson Jack, CBE, Chairman, Air Transport Licensing Board, Ministry of Aviation.
- William Jenkins, JP, Lord Mayor of Belfast.
- Christopher Frank Kearton, OBE, Chairman, Courtaulds Ltd. For services to Export.
- Frederick Measham Lea, CB, CBE, lately Director, Building Research Station, Ministry of Technology.
- Alderman Fred Longworth. For political and public services in Lancashire.
- James Henry John Matthews, JP, Alderman, Southampton City Council.
- Arnold Ashley Miles, CBE, MD, FRCP, Professor of Experimental Pathology, University of London and Director of the Lister Institute of Preventive Medicine.
- Alderman John Harry Molyneux, OBE, JP. For political and public services in Dudley.
- Clifford Naunton Morgan, FRCS, FRCOG, Senior Surgeon, St. Bartholomew's Hospital, London.
- Alderman Thomas Henry Mytton. For political and public services in Monmouthshire.
- Maurice Henry Parsons, Executive Director, Bank of England.
- Roland Algernon Penrose, CBE. For services to Art.
- Alderman Joseph Leopold Schultz, OBE. For political and public services in Yorkshire.
- Charles Ronald Sopwith, Solicitor, Board of Inland Revenue.
- James Taylor, MBE, Deputy Chairman, Royal Ordnance Factories Board.
- Arnold Charles Trinder, Aldermanic Sheriff, City of London.
- Arnold Learoyd Walker, CBE, FRCS, FRCOG, Chairman, Central Midwives Board.
- Professor William Lee Weipers, FRCVS, Director of Veterinary Education, University of Glasgow Veterinary School.
- Kenneth Clinton Wheare, CMG, Vice-Chancellor, University of Oxford. Rector, Exeter College, Oxford.
- Arthur Thomas Worboys, CBE, Chairman and Managing Director, London Brick Company Ltd.

Australian States

- Robert Bowden Madgwick, OBE, Vice-Chancellor of the University of New England, State of New South Wales.
- Norman Bede Rydge, CBE, Commissioner of the Rural Bank, State of New South Wales.
- Lewis Ronald East, CBE, lately Chairman of the State Rivers and Water Supply Commission, State of Victoria.
- Reginald Francis Graham Fogarty, CBE. For public and philanthropic services in the State of Victoria.
- Douglas Were Fraser, ISO, Public Service Commissioner, State of Queensland.

Commonwealth Relations

- Norman Stanley Alexander, CBE, Vice-Chancellor, Ahmadu Bello University, Zaria, Northern Nigeria.
- The Honourable Dauda Kairaba Jawara, Prime Minister of the Gambia.
- Ian William James McAdam, OBE, MB, FRCS(Ed), Professor of Surgery, Medical School, Makerere University College, Uganda.

Overseas Territories

- Geoffrey Pearl Boon, CBE, QC. For public services in St. Christopher-Nevis-Anguilla.
- Lionel Alfred Luckhoo, CBE, QC, Commissioner for British Guiana in the United Kingdom.

=== Order of the Bath ===
==== Knight Grand Cross of the Order of the Bath (GCB) ====
Military Division

- Air Chief Marshal Sir Wallace Kyle, KCB, CBE, DSO, DFC, Royal Air Force.

Civil Division

- Sir Noël Kilpatrick Hutton, KCB, QC, First Parliamentary Counsel.

==== Knight Commander of the Order of the Bath (KCB) ====
Military Division

Royal Navy

- Surgeon Vice-Admiral Sir Derek Duncombe Steele-Perkins, KCVO, CB, QHS, FRCS(Eng.), FRACS.

Army

- Major-General Herbert John Mogg, CB, CBE, DSO (73153), late Infantry, Colonel Commandant, 1st Battalion The Royal Green Jackets (43rd & 52nd). Colonel Commandant, Army Air Corps.
- Major-General David Peel Yates, CB, CVO, DSO, OBE (52733), late Infantry, Colonel, The South Wales Borderers.

Royal Air Force

- Acting Air Marshal Harold John Maguire, CB, DSO, OBE.

Civil Division

- Thomas Douglas Haddow, CB, Permanent Under-Secretary of State, Scottish Office.
- William Wilfred Morton, CB, Chairman, Board of Customs and Excise.

==== Companion of the Order of the Bath (CB) ====
Military Division

Royal Navy

- Major General Francis Christopher Barton, CBE.
- Rear-Admiral Thomas William Best.
- Rear-Admiral Arthur James Cawthra.
- Rear-Admiral Patrick Walter Willingdon Graham, DSC.
- Rear-Admiral Sidney Grattan-Cooper, OBE.
- Rear-Admiral Ian Lachlan Mackay McGeoch, DSO, DSC.
- Surgeon Rear-Admiral (D) William Leonard Mountain, OBE, QHDS, LDS.
- Rear-Admiral William Donough O'Brien, DSC.
- Rear-Admiral Charles Kerr Thorneycroft Wheen.

Army

- Major-General Basil Oscar Paul Eugster, CBE, DSO, MC (65413), late Foot Guards.
- Major-General Peter James Glover, OBE (62881), late Royal Regiment of Artillery, British Defence Supply Liaison Staff, India.
- Major-General Patrick Holberton Man, CBE, DSO, MC (58144), late Infantry.
- Major-General Wilfrid John Potter, CBE (56724), late Royal Army Service Corps, Colonel Commandant, Royal Army Ordnance Corps.
- Major-General Michael Whitworth Prynne, CBE (50836), late Corps of Royal Engineers.
- Major-General William Digby Manifold Raeburn, DSO, MBE (65383), late Foot Guards.
- Major-General Gordon Farleigh Upjohn, CBE (66136), late Infantry (now R.A.R.O.).
- Major-General John Edward Francis Willoughby, CBE (58173), late Infantry.

Royal Air Force

- Air Vice-Marshal Alexander Vallance Riddell Johnstone, DFC.
- Air Vice-Marshal David Cecil McKinley, CBE, DFC, AFC.
- Air Vice-Marshal Peter Theodore Philpott, CBE.
- Air Vice-Marshal Denis Graham Smallwood, CBE, DSO, DFC.
- Air Vice-Marshal Harold Guy Leonard-Williams, CBE.
- Acting Air Vice-Marshal David Nigel Kington Blair-Oliphant, OBE.
- Air Commodore Edward Geoffrey Lyall Millington, CBE, DFC.

Civil Division

- Alfred Robert Walter Bavin, Under-secretary, Ministry of Health.
- Charles Henry Blake, Assistant Under-secretary of State, Ministry of Defence (Royal Air Force).
- John Francis Bowyer, lately Chief Registrar, Bankruptcy and Companies Departments and Registrar of Restrictive Practices Court, Supreme Court of Judicature.
- Lieutenant-Colonel Edward James Augustus Howard Brush, DSO, OBE, JP, DL, lately Chairman, Territorial and Auxiliary Forces Association for County Down.
- Albert Rowland Bunker, Assistant Under-Secretary of State, Home Office.
- Frank Edward Figgures, CMG, Third Secretary, HM Treasury.
- Leslie Thomas Foster, Under-Secretary, Ministry of Public Building and Works.
- Hugh Gardner, CBE, Under-secretary, Ministry of Agriculture, Fisheries and Food.
- John Ernest Greeves, Permanent Secretary, Ministry of Home Affairs for Northern Ireland.
- John Richings James, OBE, Chief Planner, Ministry of Housing and Local Government.
- John Macgregor Bruce Lockhart, CMG, OBE, lately Foreign Office.
- Basil Wilfrid Lythall, Chief Scientist, Ministry of Defence (Royal Navy).
- William Alan Nield, Deputy Under-secretary of State, Department of Economic Affairs.
- Henry Walter Smart, Director, Savings Department, General Post Office.
- John Gerald Smith, Chief Highway Engineer, Ministry of Transport.

=== Order of Saint Michael and Saint George ===
==== Knight Commander of the Order of St Michael and St George (KCMG) ====
Diplomatic Service

- Robert Stewart Crawford, CMG, CVO, lately Foreign Office.
- Robert William Doughty Fowler, CMG, British High Commissioner, Dar es Salaam.
- John Baines Johnston, CMG, lately British High Commissioner, Salisbury.
- Edward Heywood Peck, CMG, British High Commissioner-Designate, Nairobi.
- John Arthur Pilcher, CMG, Her Majesty's Ambassador Extraordinary and Plenipotentiary at Vienna.

Commonwealth Relations

- The Honourable Henry Edward Bolte, MLA, Premier of the State of Victoria.

Colonial Office

- Hugh Selby Norman-Walker, CMG, OBE, Her Majesty's Commissioner, Bechuanaland.
- The Right Honourable John Roland, Baron Martonmere, PC, Governor and Commander-in-Chief of the Bermudas or Somers Islands.

==== Companion of the Order of St Michael and St George (CMG) ====
- Leo Bernard Aloysius Grace, MRCVS, Chief Technical Adviser on Meat Inspection, Ministry of Agriculture, Fisheries and Food.
- Edward Ian Roy MacGregor, Assistant Secretary, Ministry of Aviation. Formerly Civil Air Attaché, Her Majesty's Embassy, Washington.

Diplomatic Service

- Mark Echalaz Allan, CVO, Inspector of Her Majesty's Diplomatic Establishments.
- Kenneth Geoffrey Bennett, Puisne Judge of the High Court of Uganda.
- Kenneth Carter Benton, Foreign Office.
- Donald George Bompas, Auditor-General, Malaysia.
- John Noel Ormiston Curle, CVO, Her Majesty's Consul-General, Boston.
- Stanley James Gunn Fingland, British Deputy High Commissioner, Salisbury.
- Leonard Hagestadt, OBE, Labour Attaché, Her Majesty's Embassy, Paris.
- David Henry Thoroton Hildyard, DFC, Foreign Office.
- Peter Hope Johnston, lately Provincial Commissioner and Local Courts Adviser, Tanzania.
- John Edward Killick, Counsellor, Her Majesty's Embassy, Washington.
- Edward Noel Larmour, British Deputy High Commissioner, Lagos.
- Alistair Mackay, Financial Adviser, British High Commission, New Delhi.
- Archibald Campbell MacKellar, Administrative Officer Staff Grade, Northern Nigeria.
- Dugald Malcolm, CVO, TD, lately Her Majesty's Vice-Marshal of the Diplomatic Corps.
- Peter Meinertzhagen, Regional Controller, Commonwealth Development Corporation in West Africa.
- Philip Brian Cecil Moore, lately British Deputy High Commissioner, Singapore.
- James Conwy Morgan, British Deputy High Commissioner-Designate, Canberra.
- David Aubrey Scott, British Deputy High Commissioner, New Delhi.
- Edwin Leonard Sykes, British Deputy High Commissioner, Karachi.
- James Alexander Turpin, Counsellor (Commercial), Her Majesty's Embassy, The Hague.
- Cyril Charles Webster, lately Director of the Rubber Research Institute of Malaya.
- George Sydney Whitehead, MVO, Inspector of Her Majesty's Diplomatic Establishments.
- Harry Wells Woodruff, British Trade Commissioner, Canberra.

Australian States

- Ross Thomas Shelmerdine, OBE, of Toorak, State of Victoria. For welfare and charitable services.
- Desmond Andrew Herbert, Professor of Botany, University of Queensland.
- The Honourable Leslie Craig. For public services in the State of Western Australia.

Colonial Office

- Lewis Mervyn Davies, OBE, Chief Secretary, Western Pacific.
- Maurice Heenan, QC, Attorney General, Hong Kong.
- John Crichton McDouall, Secretary for Chinese Affairs, Hong Kong.
- Harry Parker Ritchie, Financial Secretary, Fiji.
- Robin Horton John Thorne, OBE, Administrative Officer, Class I, Aden.

=== Royal Victorian Order ===
==== Knight Commander of the Royal Victorian Order (KCVO) ====
- The Very Reverend Eric Symes Abbott, DD.
- Alan Cumbrae Rose McLeod, CVO, FDS, RCS.
- Major-General Eustace John Blois Nelson, CB, DSO, MVO, OBE, MC.

==== Commander of the Royal Victorian Order (CVO) ====
- Major-General Llewelyn Wansbrough-Jones, CB, CBE.
- Major-General William Augustus Fitzgerald Lane Fox-Pitt, DSO, MVO, MC.
- Major-General Leslie de Malapert Thuillier, CB, OBE.
- Lieutenant-Colonel Victor Buller Turner, VC.

==== Member of the Royal Victorian Order, 4th class (MVO) ====
At this time the two lowest classes of the Royal Victorian Order were "Member (fourth class)" and "Member (fifth class)", both with post-nominal letters MVO. "Member (fourth class)" was renamed "Lieutenant" (LVO) from the 1985 New Year Honours onwards.

- Winifred Maud Bateson, MVO.
- Commander Joseph Francis Bilson, Royal Navy.
- Squadron Leader David John Checketts, Royal Air Force.
- William Cole, D.Mus., FRCO.
- Chief Superintendent William Frank Gilbert, Metropolitan Police.
- Florence Lewis Haslett, OBE.
- Sheila Allison Minto, OBE.
- William Reginald James Pullen.
- Squadron Leader John Severn, Royal Air Force.

==== Member of the Royal Victorian Order, 5th class (MVO) ====
- Edmund John Turner Coad.
- Reginald Joffre Elliott.
- Ida Doris Henstock.
- Alice Muriel Lee.
- Captain Paul John Neville, Royal Marines.
- George Thomas Reed.
- Elizabeth Rose Toole.

==== Medal of the Royal Victorian Order (RVM) ====
- Horace Leonard Leslie Bond.
- Florence Bramford.
- Chief Joiner Walter Ernest Cant, P/MX59262.
- Charles Henry Cass.
- Archibald William Bamfield Cooper.
- A2379852 Corporal Leonard John Dymond, Royal Air Force.
- Harry George Elliott.
- Alan Victor Hague.
- Frederick Charles Nutbeam.
- Albert Edgar Pitcher.
- Reginald John Pratley.
- Divisional Sergeant-Major Frederick Runcorn, DCM, MM, Her Majesty's Bodyguard of the Yeomen of the Guard.
- Albert Edward Smith.
- Norah Smith.
- LO952444 Flight Sergeant John Goalen Williamson, Royal Air Force.

=== Order of the British Empire ===
==== Knight Grand Cross of the Order of the British Empire (GBE) ====
Military Division

Army

- General Sir Robert Bray, KCB, CBE, DSO, ADC (General) (39414), late Infantry, Colonel, The Duke of Wellington's Regiment (West Riding).

Royal Air Force

- Air Chief Marshal Sir Alfred Earle, KBE, CB.

Civil Division

- Sir Hugh Southern Stephenson, KCMG, CIE, CVO, OBE, Her Majesty's Ambassador Extraordinary and Plenipotentiary in South Africa.

==== Dame Commander of the Order of the British Empire (DBE) ====
Military Division

- Commandant Edith Margaret Drummond, OBE, Hon. ADC, Director, Women's Royal Naval Service.

Civil Division

- Elsie Myrtle Abbot, CBE, Third Secretary, HM Treasury.
- Elizabeth Leah Manning, Member of Parliament for East Islington, 1930–1931 and for Epping, 1945–1950. For political and public services.

==== Knight Commander of the Order of the British Empire (KBE) ====
Military Division

Royal Navy

- Rear-Admiral Edmund George Irving, CB, OBE.

Army

- Major-General Gerald William Duke, CB, CBE, DSO (52586), late Corps of Royal Engineers, Colonel Commandant, Military Provost Staff Corps (now R.A.R.O.).

Royal Air Force

- Air Vice-Marshal Thomas Ulric Curzon Shirley, CB, CBE.

Civil Division

- Sir Roger Henry Hollis, CB, OBE, lately attached Ministry of Defence.
- Norman John Skelhorn, QC, Director of Public Prosecutions.

Diplomatic Service

- William Harpham, CMG, OBE, Her Majesty's Ambassador Extraordinary and Plenipotentiary at Sofia.
- Sir James Beveridge Thomson, Lord President of the Federal Court of Malaysia.

Australian States

- The Honourable Leslie James Herron, CMG, QC, Chief Justice, State of New South Wales.

Colonial Office

- Sobhuza II, CBE, Ngwenyama of Swaziland.

==== Commander of the Order of the British Empire (CBE) ====
Military Division

Royal Navy

- Superintendent Betty Sutton Brown, Women's Royal Naval Service.
- Captain Peter Evelyn Fanshawe, OBE, DSC.
- Captain Norman Steel Grant, OBE, DSC.
- Captain Henry Reynardson Hewlett.
- Surgeon Captain Eric James, MD, FRCP (Edin.).
- Captain Richard Duncan Ritchie, MVO, ADC.
- Captain Frederick Stovin-Bradford, DSC (now retired).
- Captain William Douglas Thorburn, VRD, Royal Naval Reserve.

Army

- Colonel Peter Robert Ashburner, MC (47512), late Infantry (now R.A.R.O.).
- Colonel Robert Benjamin Gonville Bromhead, OBE (56711), late Infantry.
- Colonel Kenelm George Comerford-Green (67186), late Infantry, serving with Malaysian Forces.
- Brigadier Ralph Alfred James Eggar, OBE (68520), late Royal Army Service Corps.
- Colonel Thomas Eben Forman Hardy, MC, TD (86272), late Royal Regiment of Artillery, Territorial Army.
- Brigadier William John Gary Hayward, OBE (53619), late Royal Regiment of Artillery.
- The Reverend David Cecil Henderson, QHC, Chaplain to the Forces Second Class (99282), Royal Army Chaplains Department.
- Brigadier Simon Patrick Martin Kent, OBE (64388), late Gurkha Rifles.
- Colonel Douglas John McLelland, TD (193065), late Royal Regiment of Artillery, Territorial Army.
- Brigadier (local) Phillip Henry Dupernex Panton, OBE (380840), late Royal Regiment of Artillery.
- Colonel John Richard Vaughan Roberts, TD (87580), late Infantry, Territorial Army (now T.A.R.O.).
- Colonel Basil Wintle Thomas, ERD, TD (95046), late Corps of Royal Engineers, Army Emergency Reserve.
- Brigadier (local) Kenneth Francis Timbrell, MC (261272), The Royal Dragoons (1st Dragoons).
- Brigadier William Michael Eastwood White, OBE, ADC (74718), late Royal Army Service Corps.
- Brigadier (temporary) Alexander James Wilson, MBE, MC (180730), late Infantry.

Royal Air Force

- Air Commodore William Oliphant Baird, MBE, QHDS, FDSRCS, MRCS.
- Air Commodore Edgar James, DFC, AFC.
- Air Commodore Michael Henry Le Bas, DSO, AFC.
- Group Captain Norman Harold Bennett.
- Group Captain James Roy Forsythe, DFC.
- Group Captain Robert William George Freer.
- Group Captain Leonard Kendrick, OBE.
- Group Captain John Miller, DFC, AFC.
- Group Captain Henry Lindsay Roxburgh, OBE, MB, ChB.
- Group Captain Colin Stanley Thomas, MBE.

Civil Division

- Robert Guy Alexander, OBE, lately Assistant Secretary, Ministry of Defence (Army).
- James Anderton, OBE, Chairman, North Western Division, National Coal Board.
- William Sydney Albert Atkins, Chairman, W. S. Atkins & Partners. For services to Export.
- Albert George Bastin, Headmaster, Sir William Collins School, St. Pancras.
- Emeritus Professor Leslie Fleetwood Bates, Senior Regional Scientific Adviser, North Midland Civil Defence Region.
- Thomas Edward Beale, JP, Member of the Board, British Travel Association.
- Albert Joseph Bennett, lately Secretary, North-West Metropolitan Regional Hospital Board.
- Stephen Harold Biles, Superintending Examiner, Board of Trade.
- Major David Charles Bowser, OBE, lately Forestry Commissioner.
- Egon Bretscher, Head of Nuclear Physics Division, Harwell, United Kingdom Atomic Energy Authority.
- Alderman Florence Mills Brown. For political and public services in Bristol.
- Professor Hermann Alexander Brück, Astronomer Royal for Scotland.
- Professor William Burns, MB, ChB. For services to the Ministry of Defence (Royal Navy) on research into the problems of hearing.
- Norman Leslie Capener, FRCS, Director of the Medical Commission on Prevention of Accidents.
- John Henry Carson, JP. For political and public services in Dunbartonshire.
- Thomas Archibald Bennet-Clark, Professor of Biology, University of East Anglia.
- Hugh Anthony Clegg, FRCP, Editor, British Medical Journal.
- Cecil Glutton, Crown Estate Receiver and Managing Agent, Receiver and Agent for Church Commissioners' Estates.
- Stanley Edward Cohen, Chief Commoner, City of London.
- William Alexander Roy Collins, Chairman and a Managing Director, William Collins, Sons & Company Ltd.
- Harold Edwin Darke, Organist, St. Michael's, Cornhill.
- Thomas Glyn Davies, Director of Education, Denbighshire.
- Henry Deadman, Senior Officer for Wales, Ministry of Power.
- George Edmund Dearing, MBE, JP, Chairman, East Midlands Regional Economic Planning Council.
- Cedric Ethelwulf Dunton, lately Chief Civil Engineer, London Transport Board.
- Percy Durran, Veterinary and Animal Husbandry Adviser, Middle East Development Division, Ministry of Overseas Development.
- Geoffrey Bertram Robert Feilden. For services to Engineering Design.
- Alderman Herbert Frazer. For political and public services in Norwich.
- The Very Reverend Edward Louis Frossard, Dean of Guernsey.
- Malcolm Gavin, MBE, formerly Professor of Electronic Engineering, University College of North Wales.
- William Gerald Golding, Writer.
- Ernst Hans Josef Gombrich, Director, Warburg Institute and Professor of the History of the Classical Tradition, University of London.
- Sidney Francis Greene, General Secretary, National Union of Railwaymen.
- Charles Frederick Grey, MP, Member of Parliament for Durham since 1945; Opposition Whip 1962–October 1964; Comptroller of HM Household and Government Whip since October, 1964. For political and public services.
- Sidney Cyril Hamburger, JP, Alderman, County Borough of Salford.
- Elsie Hopper, JP. For political and public services in Northumberland.
- William Arthur Horne, MD, Medical Officer of Health, Glasgow.
- Patrick Lawrence Hughes, OBE, Assistant Secretary, North West Regional Office, Manchester, Ministry of Housing and Local Government.
- Margaret Hyde, JP. For political and public services in Midlothian.
- John Alfred Jaggers, Assistant Secretary, Atomic Weapons and Research, Ministry of Aviation.
- Alderman David Gwyn Jones, JP. For political and public services in Islington.
- Francis Avery Jones, MD, FRCP, Physician-in-Charge Gastroenterological Department, Central Middlesex Hospital.
- Fred Jones, Senior Economic Adviser, Department of Economic Affairs.
- John Robert Kell, Partner, Oscar Faber & Partners.
- Arthur Henry King, OBE, Controller, Education Division, British Council.
- Howard Leslie Kirkley, Director, Oxford Committee for Famine Relief.
- Thomas Norman Lockyer, Assistant Solicitor, Ministry of Labour.
- John Andrew McKay, Chief Constable, Manchester City Police.
- Alderman James Cameron McLean. For political and public services in Bexley.
- Maurice McManus, Lord Provost of Dundee.
- Colonel Denis McMullen, Chief Inspecting Officer of Railways, Ministry of Transport.
- Hector McNeil, Managing Director, Babcock & Wilcox Ltd. For services to Export.
- Frederick Chilton Margetts, MBE, Member, British Railways Board.
- George Abercromby Mitchell, JP. For social services.
- Edward Croft-Murray, Keeper of Prints and Drawings, British Museum.
- Harold Carter Naldrett, Clerk of Assize, Midland Circuit.
- George Wilfred Newman. For political and public services in Staffordshire.
- Jean Josephine Nunn, Under-Secretary, Cabinet Office.
- George Chester Ogden, Town Clerk, Leicester.
- Alderman Frank Pattison. For political and public services in Gateshead.
- William Frederick Pendrill. For political and public services.
- Alderman John Percival Pennington, JP. For political and public services in Rowley Regis.
- Harold Neil Pickering, OBE. Assistant Secretary, Headquarters, General Post Office.
- John Edward Piercy, FRCS(Ed.), LRCP, Surgeon Specialist (Superintendent), New End Hospital, Hampstead.
- Mary Gabrielle Pike, JP, Chairman, Executive Committee, National Federation of Women's Institutes.
- Thomas Henry Gairdner Price. For services to the pig and bacon industry in Northern Ireland.
- Sydney Robert Raffan, Assistant Secretary, Board of Trade.
- Peter Randolph, Deputy Chairman, Wilkinson Sword Ltd. For services to Export.
- Michael Alexander Sinclair Scott, Chairman, Scotts Shipbuilding & Engineering Company Ltd.
- William George Scott, Painter.
- Ernest Philip Rushton Scragg, Chairman and Joint Managing Director, Ernest Scragg & Sons Ltd. For services to Export.
- Professor Andrew Best Semple, VRD, MD, ChB, Medical Officer of Health, Liverpool.
- John Brian Statham. For services to cricket.
- James Gemmell Strachan, HM Chief Inspector of Schools (Further Education), Scottish Education Department.
- Alexander Stuart, Commodore Chief Engineer, SS Canberra, Orient Steam Navigation Company Ltd.
- Harry Bernard Taylor, MP, Member of Parliament for Mansfield since 1941. Parliamentary Secretary to Ministry of National Insurance, 1950–1951. For political and public services.
- Lieutenant-Colonel Peter Francis Thorne, Deputy Serjeant at Arms, House of Commons.
- Professor Richard Morris Titmuss, Member, National Insurance Advisory Committee.
- Charles Hugh Willis Troughton, MC, TD, Director, Navy, Army and Air Force Institutes.
- Walter Tye, OBE, Chief Technical Officer, Air Registration Board.
- Stephen Edmund Van Ryssen, MBE, Lately Director of Ordnance Factories, Weapons and Fighting Vehicles Group, Ministry of Defence (Army).
- Eric John Newnham Warburton, Deputy Chairman, City of London Savings Committee.
- Robert Henderson Watherston, lately Chairman of Directors, Royal Highland and Agricultural Society of Scotland.
- William Henry Watling, Principal Executive Officer, Ministry of Pensions and National Insurance.
- Douglas Pole Welman, Chairman, Southern Gas Board.
- Eric Walter White, Assistant Secretary, Arts Council of Great Britain.
- Gwilym Tecwyn Williams, Deputy President, National Farmers' Union of England and Wales.

Diplomatic Service

- Kenneth Bannister, British subject resident in Mexico.
- John William Briant, British subject resident in France.
- Francis Herbert Butcher. For services to the blind in Nigeria.
- William Lynndon Clough, British Council Representative, Nepal.
- John Bright Duguid, MD, ChB, Histopathologist, Institute of Medical Research, Kuala Lumpur, Malaysia.
- Margaret Isobel Dunlop, MBE, lately First Secretary, Her Majesty's Embassy, Lisbon.
- Henry Powell Greensmith, MBE. For services to Horticulture, Kenya.
- Joseph Harold. For services to the British community in Nigeria.
- John Alan McCall-Judson, lately Counsellor, Her Majesty's Embassy, Washington.
- William Lackie, British subject resident in Japan.
- Donald Matheson, lately Commissioner of Police, Sabah Component, Royal Malaysia Police.
- Joseph Aloysius O'Brien, lately British Council Representative, Nigeria.
- Edward Eric Orchard, OBE, lately Head of Russian Secretariat, Her Majesty's Embassy, Moscow.
- Myles Walter Ponsonby, Her Majesty's Consul-General, Hanoi.
- David Leslie Vivian Rowe, OBE, MC. For services to the British community in India.
- James Gordon Ruffell, OBE, British subject resident in Italy.
- Christine Sandford, OBE, British subject resident in Ethiopia.
- Robert Gray Sangster, lately Conservator of Forests, Tanzania.
- Selwyn Willis Fraser-Smith, OBE, MC, lately Commissioner for Village Settlement, Tanzania.
- Harold Norman Smyth, VRD. For services to British shipping in Malaysia.
- David Lockhart Stewart, MBE, Counsellor, British High Commission, Kuala Lumpur.
- Dudeley John Stringer, lately General Manager, Tanganyika Electric Supply Company Ltd.
- Richard Edward Wilkinson, MBE, Her Majesty's Consul-General, Izmir.
- William John Wilkinson, OBE, British subject resident in Belgium.

Australian States

- Alderman William Herbert Northam, of Sydney, State of New South Wales. For his services to yachting and the community.
- Ewan Murray Robson, DSO. For services to the community in the State of New South Wales.
- John Alexander Lachlan Shaw, DSO, Commissioner for Main Roads, State of New South Wales.
- Gordon Charles Cooper. For services to the theatrical profession in the State of Victoria.
- Harold Frederick Stokes. For services to the community in the State of Victoria.
- The Honourable Russell Thomas White. For public, political and welfare services in the State of Victoria.
- Anthony John Stratigos, of Brisbane, State of Queensland. For his services to commerce and the community.
- Walter Albert Ashton. For his contribution to the development, of primary and secondary industry in the State of Western Australia.
- Graham Hall, Chief Commissioner, Boy Scout Movement, in the State of Tasmania.

Colonial Office

- Hugh David MacEwen Barton, MBE. For services to commerce in Hong Kong.
- Carlos Gomes. For public services in British Guiana.
- Leonard Arthur Wyon Hawkins, Chairman and Chief Executive Officer, Swaziland Railway.
- Charles Trevor Kelly, Minister for Maritime Affairs (Acting Minister for Tourism), Bahamas.
- William Oscar Rudyard Kendall, Minister of Trade and Industry, British Guiana.
- Ernest Stanley Robinson. For public services in Barbados.
- John Crampton Summerfield, OBE, Attorney General, Bermuda.
- Harry Douglas Mackenzie Sutton, Secretary and Commissioner of Labour and Welfare, Ministry of Labour and Welfare, Aden State.
- Luther Reginald Wynter, OBE, MD, CM. For public services in Antigua.

==== Officer of the Order of the British Empire (OBE) ====
Military Division

Royal Navy

- Reverend Father William Christopher Thomas Briscoe.
- Acting Commander Peter Graham Burden, MBE.
- Lieutenant Colonel Robert Ponsonby Carter, MC, Royal Marines.
- Commander Alan Stewart Craig.
- Commander Bertram John Darlow.
- Commander Michael Peter Dawes (formerly on loan to the Government of Malaysia).
- Commander Hubert Frank Fewins (Retired).
- Commander John Walter France, VRD, Royal Naval Reserve.
- Commander Sydney Robert Hack.
- Commander William Hawley.
- Commander Paul Robert House.
- Surgeon Commander Cecil Owen Le Cocq Hughes, MB, ChB.
- Commander Michael Magnus Osborn (for services with the British Joint Services Training Team, Ghana).
- Commander John David Latimer Repard, DSC.
- Commander Edward Douglas Symes.
- Commodore Owen Ralph Turville, VRD, Hong Kong Royal Naval Reserve.
- Instructor Commander William Angus Waddell.

Army

- Lieutenant-Colonel Bernard Amato Gauci, ED, King's Own Malta Regiment, Territorial Army.
- Lieutenant-Colonel (acting) Lionel Rees Barker, ERD (76391), Combined Cadet Force.
- Lieutenant-Colonel William Gerald Hugh Beach, MBE, MC (251023), Corps of Royal Engineers.
- Lieutenant-Colonel Stuart Charles Anthony Nepean Bishop (112812), The Parachute Regiment.
- Lieutenant-Colonel Henry Leslie Carey (368535), The Parachute Regiment, Territorial Army.
- Lieutenant-Colonel Cecil Thomas Carter (112824), Intelligence Corps.
- Lieutenant-Colonel Mary Creagh, TD (412388), Women's Royal Army Corps, Territorial Army.
- Lieutenant-Colonel Hugh Patrick Cunningham (224976), Corps of Royal Engineers.
- Colonel William Mostyn Gibbs (138091), Staff, Territorial Army.
- Lieutenant-Colonel Allan William Grendon (249270), The Royal Highland Fusiliers (Princess Margaret's Own Glasgow and Ayrshire Regiment).
- Lieutenant-Colonel (temporary) Maurice William Howe (91745), Royal Regiment of Artillery.
- Lieutenant-Colonel Thomas Graeme Hogarth Jackson, MBE (210376), Royal Corps of Signals.
- Lieutenant-Colonel Sir Ian Liddell Jardine, Bt., MC (268990), Coldstream Guards.
- Colonel Donald Newton Locke (112870), Staff, late Royal Corps of Transport.
- Lieutenants-Colonel Richard Mervyn St. George Kirke (77540), Royal Regiment of Artillery.
- Lieutenant-Colonel John Samuel Martin, MBE (143588), The Welch Regiment.
- Lieutenant-Colonel George Victor Micallef (98282), Royal Malta Artillery.
- Lieutenant-Colonel William O'Brien, MD, MRCP (227137), Royal Army Medical Corps.
- Lieutenant-Colonel John Halkerston Preston (155769), Corps of Royal Engineers (now R.A.R.O.).
- Lieutenant-Colonel John Inglis Purser (226283), Corps of Royal Engineers.
- Lieutenant-Colonel Arthur Roberts (297652), Royal Army Pay Corps.
- Lieutenant-Colonel (temporary) Francis Michael Sexton (300771), Corps of Royal Engineers.
- Lieutenant-Colonel Alexander Blackie Shearer (232674), Staff, late Royal Artillery (Employed List 1).
- Colonel David Alistair Hope Sime, MC, TD (204119), Staff, Territorial Army.
- Lieutenant-Colonel Charles Anthony Simpson, TD (67731), The King's Regiment (Manchester and Liverpool).
- Lieutenant-Colonel Maurice William Sutcliffe (233307), Army Air Corps.
- Lieutenant-Colonel Michael Colvin Watson, MC (77593), Royal Armoured Corps, Territorial Army.
- Lieutenant-Colonel Eric Albert Delaney Wilde, MC (232702), Royal Tank Regiment.
- Lieutenant-Colonel (acting) Frank Williams (283393), Army Cadet Force.

Royal Air Force

- Wing Commander John Darral Ackerman, MBE (58785).
- Wing Commander Herbert Victor Bunting (43190).
- Wing Commander Thomas Gow Dobie, MB, ChB (152891).
- Wing Commander Ernest David Green (49306).
- Wing Commander William Arthur Sidney Harrison, MBE (190481).
- Wing Commander Robert Henderson (57864).
- Wing Commander John Ernest Jacobs (154061).
- Wing Commander Wilfred Stanley Lloyd (51)535).
- Wing Commander Stanley Henry Martin (49148).
- Wing Commander Alan Powell (44115).
- Wing Commander William John Randall, MBE (141952).
- Wing Commander Sidney Major Russell (45778).
- Wing Commander Christopher Antony Wade (52372).
- Acting Wing Commander George Ellams, AFC (49286).
- Acting Wing Commander Ewart Pryor, MBE (65856), Royal Air Force Volunteer Reserve (Training Branch).
- Acting Wing Commander Frederick Eugene Wood (85532), Royal Auxiliary Air Force.
- Squadron Leader Reginald Trevor Holburn (3057619), Royal Air Force Regiment.
- Squadron Leader Robert Marshall (154784).

Civil Division

- Andrew Riddel Abercromby, Member, National Savings Committee for Scotland.
- William Bennett Adam, lately Director, Fruit and Vegetable Canning and Quick Freezing Research Association.
- John William Allam, Chief Test Pilot, Handley Page Ltd.
- Samuel Alper, Joint Chairman and Managing Director, Caravans International Ltd., Newmarket. For services to Export.
- Walter Norman Anderson, Head of Telecommunications and Experimental Group, Independent Television Authority.
- Lieutenant-Colonel Jack Kennedy Arthur, Secretary, Scottish Branch, British Red Cross Society.
- James Gore Atherton, MBE, Chairman, St Helens and District War Pensions Committee.
- Frederick Charles Atkins. For services to mushroom growing.
- Ernest Harrison Wynne Atkinson, lately London Editor, The Birmingham Post and The Birmingham Mail.
- Charles Arnold-Baker, Secretary, National Association of Parish Councils.
- Maud Ball. For political and public services in Barking.
- Irene Turberville Barclay, Estates Manager and Honorary Secretary, St. Pancras Housing Society Ltd.
- Walter Barker. For political and public services in Stalybridge.
- Ralph Henry Beeson, Deputy Principal Probation Inspector, Home Office.
- Neville Samuel Billington, Director, Heating and Ventilating Research Association.
- Alfred William Bird, Registrar of the Lands Tribunal.
- John Gregory Birkett, Principal Housing and Planning Inspector, Ministry of Housing and Local Government.
- Gerald Black, Keeper of the Registers of Scotland.
- William Francis Blackmore, Principal Officer, Ministry of Agriculture for Northern Ireland.
- Charles Walter Blundell, Director, Finance Division, HM Stationery Office.
- Wilfred Bodsworth, Departmental Class—Grade All, Government Communications Headquarters.
- Percy Bowles, Chief Engineer, Rutherford Laboratory, Science Research Council.
- Cyril Bradley, JP, Permanent Branch Secretary and District Organiser, Transport and General Workers' Union.
- Robert Forbes Braid, JP, Chairman, Scottish Accident Prevention Council.
- Arthur Edward Bray, Divisional Executive Officer, Preston, Ministry of Agriculture, Fisheries and Food.
- William Isaac Brinson, JP. For political and public services in Poplar.
- Alan Edgar Bristow, Managing Director, Bristow Helicopters Ltd.
- Leslie Dennis Britain, DFC, Chairman and Managing Director, Britains Ltd. For services to Export.
- Brigadier Charles Richard Britten, MC, JP, DL. For public services in Worcestershire.
- Raymond Frederick Brown, Chairman and Managing Director, Racal Electronics Ltd.
- James Alan Edward Bryan, Chairman, Civil Defence Committee, Leicestershire.
- Harold Buckley, lately Secretary and Executive Officer, Co-operative Wholesale Society Ltd.
- George Henry Buckton, Senior Chief Executive Officer, Air Forces Middle East, Ministry of Defence (Royal Air Force).
- The Honourable Desiree Butterwick, JP. For voluntary social services in Buckinghamshire.
- Reginald Percy Brian Cave, Chief Executive Officer, Passport Office.
- Kathleen Inga Cawood, lately Matron, Alder Hey Children's Hospital, Liverpool.
- Margaret Lilias, Lady Charles, Special Assistant to the Chairman on Finance, Legal Matters and Refugees, Women's Voluntary Service.
- Leonard Clark, HM Inspector of Schools, Department of Education and Science.
- Christopher William Clayson, MD, FRCP, Physician Superintendent, Lochmaben Chest Hospital.
- John Hardie Collins, JP, Alderman, Widnes Borough Council.
- Hilda Marsden Connor, Principal, Scottish Home and Health Department.
- Thomas William Dudley Cooper, Managing Director, Qualcast Ltd., Derby. For services to Export.
- Archibald Edwin Cotton, Alderman, Lambeth London Borough Council.
- Jack Crowther, National Saving District Member for North West Lincolnshire.
- Harry Donald Davis, DSO, MBE, VRD, Controller, Statistical Office, Board of Customs and Excise.
- Ronald George Cecil Davis, Chief Executive Officer, Ministry of Defence.
- John Geoffrey Dent, Headmaster, Fulwood County Secondary School, Preston, Lancashire.
- Lawrence George Devereux, lately Chairman, Overseas Service Pensioners' Association.
- Beatrice Eveline Double, JP. For public service in Essex.
- Vera Ruth Gordon Douie, Librarian, Fawcett Library.
- Willoughy Mervyn Hammett Drake, MBE, Chief Officer, Devon Fire Brigade.
- Mark Morgan Du Merton, Principal, Ministry of Defence (Royal Navy).
- George Dunlop, Honorary President, National Farmers Union of Scotland.
- Richard Michael Desmond Dunston, Chairman and Managing Director, Richard Dunston Ltd., Shipbuilders and Ship Repairers, Thorne, Yorkshire.
- Flora Cicely Dyson, County Superintendent (Nursing), North Riding of Yorkshire, St. John Ambulance Brigade.
- Charles William Earp, Chief Engineer, Radio Division, Standard Telephones & Cables Ltd.
- James Douglas Edmondston, Director, Personnel Department, British Council.
- Alderman Reginald Oscar Fewkes. For political and public services in Brighton.
- Alderman Henry Barker Fisher. For political and public services in King's Lynn.
- John Fitzgerald, JP. For political and public services in Leyton.
- James Ross Fraser, lately Principal Scientific Officer, Laboratory of the Government Chemist, Ministry of Technology.
- Malcolm Argles Frost, Head of Transcription Service, British Broadcasting Corporation.
- Christopher John Gibbs, Chief Agent, National Trust.
- Major The Right Honourable George Alexander Eugene Douglas, The Earl Haig, DL. For services to the British Legion, Scotland.
- Walter Harold Haigh, Official Receiver, Bankruptcy High Court, Board of Trade.
- Francis William Hall, Lay Member, Pensions Appeal Tribunals.
- Harry Syre Hall, Senior Principal Scientific Officer, National Institute for Research in Dairying, Reading.
- Maurice Charles Fuller-Hall, First Class Valuer, Board of Inland Revenue.
- The Right Honourable Herbert Arthur, Baron Cozens-Hardy, JP, DL. For public services in Lancashire.
- John Harper, Head of Fuel Element Laboratory, Reactor Group, United Kingdom Atomic Energy Authority.
- Frederick Charles Henry, MBE, JP, General Secretary, Waterproof Garment Workers' Union.
- Leslie William Higgins, Postal Controller, Home Counties Regional Headquarters, General Post Office.
- Alexander William Hildrew, Chairman, Cheltenham and District Youth Employment Committee.
- Thomas Charles Birkett Hodgson, Chief Constable, Berkshire Constabulary.
- Major Robert Besley Howells, Voluntary health worker, particularly in Cheshire.
- Douglas Heber Ingall, Chairman, Panel of Assessors for the training and examination for the National Certificate of District Nursing.
- William Kenneth Ireland, Festival Director and Secretary, Pitlochry Festival Society Ltd.
- Captain George Washington Irvin, lately Captain Superintendent, TS Indefatigable and National Sea Training School for Boys.
- Forbes Jackson, Chairman, Wiring Regulations Committee, Institution of Electrical Engineers.
- Francis Jackson, Higher Waterguard Superintendent, Board of Customs and Excise.
- Kenneth James Johnson, Chairman, Management Side, Ancillary Staffs Whitley Council.
- Kenneth James Johnson, Director of Industrial Organisation, Confederation of British Industry.
- Captain Wilfred Norman Johnson, Chief Marine Superintendent, Atlantic Steam Navigation Company Ltd.
- John Johnston, Commodore Chief Engineer, MV British Venture, British Petroleum Tanker Company Ltd.
- Michael Everitt Kelly, Principal, Ministry of Power.
- The Reverend Brother Stephen Kelly, Deputy Manager, St. Patrick's Training School, Belfast.
- James Thomas Kernohan, Secretary Manager, Royal Ulster Agricultural Society.
- Alfred Edward Knight, MBE, Managing Director, Alfred Knight Ltd. For services to Export.
- Norman Lampitt, Senior Civil Engineer, Ministry of Public Building and Works.
- Francis Deans Lawson, Chairman and Joint Managing Director, Robert Lawson & Sons (Holdings) Ltd., Dyce, Aberdeenshire.
- Eric Cuthbert Bernard Lee, Constructor, Ministry of Defence (Royal Navy).
- Harry Natalie Levitt, LMSSA, General Medical Practitioner, London.
- Constance Mary Lewcock. For political and public services in Newcastle upon Tyne.
- Lieutenant-Colonel Dudley Lewis, DSO, MC, Lately Chairman, Reigate Advisory Committee on Justices of the Peace.
- James Gwynfor Lewis, Mayor of Port Talbot, Glamorgan.
- John Stephen Aylwin Lewis, Deputy Head, Overseas Services Resettlement Bureau, Ministry of Overseas Development.
- Donald Owen Light, Chairman, International Hockey Board.
- John Vaughan Loach, Registrar, University of Leeds.
- Harold Parker Lord, Group Manager, Flour and Animal Feeding-stuffs Mills, Cooperative Wholesale Society Ltd.
- Alderman Florence Kathleen Lower, Lord Mayor, City of Oxford.
- Colin Livingston MacDougall, Deputy Commander, Metropolitan Police.
- Robert William McDowall, Investigator, Royal Commission on Historical Monuments (England).
- Frank Machin, lately Northern Editorial Manager, Daily Herald.
- Charles Alexander McIntosh, Chief Constable, Coatbridge Burgh Police.
- George Arthur Balfour McIvor, Principal Scientific Officer, Road Research Laboratory, Ministry of Transport.
- Donald Mackinnon Mackenzie, MB, ChB, General Medical Practitioner, Northallerton, Yorkshire.
- Wing Commander Ian Wilfred Campbell Mackenzie, AFC, Chairman, No. 5(F) (Northampton) Squadron Committee, Air Training Corps.
- William Henry Boyle Mackenzie, JP. For political and public services in Gravesend.
- Francis Thomas Maggs, Principal Scientific Officer, Rocket Propulsion Establishment, Ministry of Aviation.
- John James Maguire, JP, Secretary, Fermanagh County Council.
- John William Mahoney, Secretary, The Wine and Spirit Association of Great Britain.
- Sheina Macalister Marshall, lately Deputy Director, Scottish Marine Biological Association.
- John Newman Martin, Clerk to the Justices for the Beccles, Blything, Bungay and Mutford and Lothingland Divisions of Suffolk and the Borough of Lowestoft.
- Alderman James Stephen Meadows. For political and public services in Birmingham.
- William Meikle, MB, BS, Senior Medical Officer, Ministry of Health.
- Alderman Frederick Arthur Millard, JP. For political and public services in Hertfordshire.
- Lionel Murray, Head of Research and Economic Department, Trades Union Congress.
- W.H. Murray, For services to Mountaineering in Scotland.
- Bertram Mycock, Industrial Correspondent, News Division, British Broadcasting Corporation.
- Stanley Edward Bradford Kerr-Nesbitt, Senior Divisional Valuer, Greater London Council.
- James Henry Nicholls, Member of the Legislative Council, Isle of Man.
- Herbert Brown Noble, MBE, Chairman, Carlisle County Borough Savings Committee.
- James Nott, MBE. For services to hop growing.
- Brigadier Arthur Denis Gordon Orr, DSO, lately Secretary, Territorial and Auxiliary Forces Association for the County of Nottingham.
- Charles Leonard Palmer, Chief Executive Officer, Export Credits Guarantee Department.
- Florence Beedham Parker, Grade 2 Officer, Ministry of Labour.
- Frederick Charles Pegg. For services to the Royal Air Forces Association.
- Elizabeth Maud Pepperell (Mrs. Brewin), Assistant Director, Industrial Welfare Society.
- Raymond William Postgate, Writer.
- Harold John Price. For political and public services in Bletchley.
- George Temple Ramply, lately Member, Huntingdon and Peterborough Agricultural Executive Committee.
- Anthony Rampton, Secretary, Standing Conference of Adoption Societies.
- Alderman Bertha Ethelene Redding. For public service in Surrey.
- Captain George Howard Charles Reynolds, Commander, Cable & Wireless Ltd.
- Roy Astley Hamilton Richards, Chief Executive Officer, HM Diplomatic Service.
- The Reverend Robert Errington Robson, Alderman, Northumberland County Council.
- Keith Dudley Ulysses Rogers, Operations Controller, Associated Television Ltd.
- Maurice Ross, Principal, Bromsgrove College of Further Education, Worcestershire.
- Frances Helen Rosser, Headmistress, Welshpool High School, Montgomeryshire.
- Leonard Ford Scantlebury, Staff Engineer, Engineering Department, General Post Office.
- William Henry Scott, MBE, Honorary Secretary, Birmingham Savings Committee.
- Ernest Stanley Sellers, Assistant General Manager, Refineries Department, British Petroleum Company Ltd.
- Leslie Alexander Simpson, Grade 2 Officer, Ministry of Labour.
- Michael Ronald Fraser Simson, Secretary, National Corporation for the Care of Old People.
- James Burgess Henderson Skinner, Senior Engineer, Yorkshire and Humberside Division, Ministry of Transport.
- Kathleen Maud Priscilla Smale, Deputy Overseas Manager, Malcolm Clubs, Royal Air Force.
- Wilfrid Stanley Smethurst, Regional Controller, South-Western Region, National Assistance Board.
- Henry Geoffrey Smith, Chief Army Department Analyst, Ministry of Defence (Army).
- Richard Henry Smith, Conservator of Forests, South East England, Forestry Commission.
- James Lewis Snowdon, Engineer and Construction Superintendent, Bibby Line Ltd.
- Henry Woolf Standring, Chairman, Warwickshire Agricultural Executive Committee.
- James Kenneth Steel, TD, LRCP, LRCS, Senior Medical Officer, Ministry of Pensions and National Insurance.
- Captain Alfred Graham Stephenson, General Manager, Shoreham Harbour Trust.
- Charles William Fowler Thomas, LDS, General Dental Practitioner, London.
- Herbert William Thomas, Superintending Electrical and Mechanical Engineer, Ministry of Public Building and Works.
- Samuel Bowen Thomas, Bacteriologist Grade I, Ministry of Agriculture, Fisheries and Food.
- Thomas John Thomas, Chairman, Glantawe Hospital Management Committee.
- Walter Herbert John Thornton, Principal Information Officer, Central Office of Information.
- Stanley Thorpe, Engineer I, Royal Small Arms Factory, Ministry of Defence (Army).
- Elsie Barker Tidy, Head of Education Department, City of Coventry College of Education.
- Anne Margaret Olive Tougher. For public services in Belfast.
- Sam Trueman, lately Councillor, Barnsley County Borough Council.
- Paul Francois Reginald Vaillant, Manager, South America, British Overseas Airways Corporation.
- Sidney Gare Vaux, Chairman, Somerset Agricultural Executive Committee.
- Alderman James Vickers, JP. For political and public services in Bolton.
- Captain George Whalley Wakeford, MBE, Director, School of Navigation, University of Southampton.
- Tom Wakeling, JP, Chairman, Leicester Advisory Committee, National Assistance Board.
- Joseph Watson, JP. For political and public services in Wallsend.
- Edward Waugh, Secretary, Faculty of Actuaries in Scotland and Secretary, Associated Scottish Life Offices.
- Harry Edward Charles Webb. For political and public services in Surrey.
- Commander (Acting Captain) Walter Reginald Wells, DSC, Royal Navy, Deputy Controller, Government Signals Planning Staff, Cabinet Office.
- Robert Westwater, Technical Service Manager, Nobel Division, Imperial Chemical Industries Ltd.
- Percival Albert Frederick White, Senior Superintendent, Chemical Technology Division, Aldermaston, United Kingdom Atomic Energy Authority.
- Gordon Goldie Wilkinson. For political and public services in Cumberland.
- Edwin George Amphlett Williams, Engineer Grade I, Guided Weapons and Electronic Production Division, Ministry of Aviation.
- Alderman George Ernest Willis, JP, Managing Director and News Editor, Newbury Weekly News.
- Edith Agnes Wills, JP, Member of Parliament for the Duddeston Division of Birmingham, 1945–1950. For political and public services.
- John Heber Wooldridge. For political and public services in Worcestershire.
- William Brunsdon Yapp, Member, National Parks Commission.

Diplomatic Service

- Duncan Ward Targett-Adams, British subject resident in Venezuela.
- Basil Clifford Akehurst, MBE, lately Director of Research Division, Ministry of Agriculture, Tanzania.
- Nevil Grant Allen, British subject resident in the Persian Gulf.
- Dermot Fleetwood Barton, lately Under-secretary, Sabah, Malaysia.
- The Right Reverend Vincent Aloysius Billington, Roman Catholic Bishop of Kampala, Uganda.
- Christopher Richard Brodrick Birdwood, British subject lately resident in Kuwait.
- Evan Winfrid Bishop. For services to the British community in Pakistan.
- Ardon Beresford Brereton, MB, ChB, Senior Radiologist to the Federal Government of Nigeria.
- Stephen Gilbert Bathe-Brown. For services to the British community in Assam, India.
- Neil Vincent Casey, Commissioner of Inland Revenue, Singapore.
- Eric George Charlton, Chief Inspector of Machinery, Malaysia.
- The Reverend Eric Douglas Colbatch Clark, MBE, Principal, Rural Training Centre, Asaba, Nigeria.
- Gerald Cooper, British subject resident in Chile.
- Gordon Bryce Francis Cousens, British subject resident in Belgium.
- Gladys van Deurs, British subject resident in the Argentine Republic.
- Leonard Stephen Downes, British Council Representative, Viet Nam.
- Frank Stanley Fielding, Her Majesty's Consul (Commercial), Cape Town.
- Zdzislaw Kasimierz Fiuczek, Chief Electrical Engineer, Public Utilities Board, Singapore.
- John Arthur Garrod, Senior Inspector of Education, Eastern Nigeria.
- Robert John Graham, Administrative Officer Class I, Eastern Nigeria.
- Kenneth Grandville, Her Majesty's Consul (Economic), Frankfurt.
- Alfred Charles Hall, Director, British Information Services, Canberra.
- Arthur James Weston Hockenhull, Counsellor (Information) and Director of British Information Services, British High Commission, Kuala Lumpur.
- Michael Powell Hutchinson, MRCS, LRCP, lately Consultant in Human Trypanosomiasis, Northern Nigeria.
- John Isherwood, MBE, lately Her Majesty's Consul, Port Elizabeth.
- Ronald William John Keay, lately Director of Forest Research in Nigeria.
- James Nisbet Lockerbie, Chief Architect, Public Utilities Board, Singapore.
- Lieutenant-Colonel Alan Weston Martin, Administrative Officer' Staff Grade, Nigeria.
- Hugh William Crispen Newlands, Commissioner of Veterinary Services, Uganda.
- Martin Ogle, lately Senior Education Officer and Principal, Anderson School, Ipoh, Malaysia.
- John Weaver Pallister, lately Director, Geological Survey, Tanganyika.
- Norman James Plummer, British subject, resident in the United States of America.
- Roger Edward Rowe, Projects and Planning Officer, Western Nigeria.
- Neil Joseph Ryan, lately Headmaster, Malay College, Kuala Kargsar, Malaysia.
- Douglas Jack Pearce Scott, lately Assistant Director, Veterinary Division, Ministry of Agriculture, Tanzania.
- Frances Elizabeth Scott, lately Field Secretary, Lebanon Evangelical Mission.
- Daphne Elizabeth Logan Shankland. For services to the British community in India and to Indo-British relations.
- Thomas Michael Budworth Sharp, Administrative Officer Class I, Northern Nigeria.
- Theodore Gumming Skinner, MB, FRCS, Medical Missionary in charge of the Scottish Mission Hospital, Jalalpur Jattan, West Punjab, Pakistan.
- Donald Airth Smith, MBE, Chief Education Officer, British Council, India.
- Robert George Smith, Assistant Commissioner of Police, Sarawak Constabulary, Malaysia.
- Maurice Raymond Snodin, lately British Council Regional Representative, Eastern Nigeria.
- Kenneth Derek Bousfield Thomson, MRCS, LRCP, Senior Medical Officer (Group 6), Northern Nigeria.
- Peter Percival Turner, MD, MRCP, Physician to the President of Uganda.
- George Harold Vellacott, MBE. For services to education and the community in Nigeria.
- Dennis Arthur Wykes Walker, Chief Veterinary Officer (Group 5), Northern Nigeria.
- Peter Bertram Gerard Waller, MBE, Assistant Commissioner, Royal Malaysia Police.

Australian States

- Frederick Ehrenfried Baume. For services to journalism in the State of New South Wales.
- Councillor Herbert Thomas Ellsmore. For services to local government in the State of New South Wales.
- The Reverend Norman Gladstone Pardey. For services to the community in the State of New South Wales.
- Alderman Henry Thomas Skilton, of Maitland, State of New South Wales. For services to local government.
- Aileen Lucretia Watkins. For services to the community, especially as President for the State of New South Wales of the War Widows' Guild of Australia.
- George Henry Frederick Bell, of Toorak, State of Victoria. For services to Australian Art.
- Harry Wilfred Buckley, of Kallistra, State of Victoria. For community services, particularly as Honorary Treasurer, Winston Churchill Memorial Trust.
- Althea Irene Meredith, of Boronia, State of Victoria. For social welfare services.
- Walter Joseph O'Donoghue, of Hawthorn, State of Victoria. For his services in connection with the Winston Churchill Memorial Trust Appeal.
- Audrey Tattie Hinchcliffe Reader, JP. For community and welfare services in the State of Victoria.
- Isadore Leslie Schroder, JP. For social welfare services, particularly in connection with Prince Henry's Hospital, Melbourne, State of Victoria.
- Allan James Campbell, of Brisbane, State of Queensland. For charitable and community welfare services.
- John Henry Devitt, of Brisbane, State of Queensland. For services to the community, particularly in the field of motoring.
- The Reverend George Nash. For services to the Methodist Church and youth welfare in the State of Queensland.
- James Gordon Tod. For services to the development of the grain growing industry in the State of Queensland.
- Percy George Samuel Hope, a prominent Surveyor in the State of Western Australia.
- William Ernest Pickering, JP. For services to youth and the community in the State of Western Australia.
- Edwin Angus Richardson. For services to local government and the community in the Port Hedland district, State of Western Australia.
- Richard Charles Franks. For his services with the Hydro-Electric Commission of the State of Tasmania for many years.

Colonial Office

- Eric Herbert George Blacklock, MC. For public services in Gilbert and Ellice Islands Colony.
- Pearson McKattick Burch-Smith, JP. For public services in British Guiana.
- John Clinton, MBE, Administrative Secretary, Gibraltar.
- Edward James Coode, lately British Commissioner and Consul, Tonga.
- Polycarp Ka-Lazarus Dlamini. For public services in Swaziland.
- John Falconer, Director of Veterinary Services, Bechuanaland.
- Stevan George, MB, ChB. For public services in the Bahamas.
- Harold Edward Gould, Deputy Commissioner of Police, Aden.
- Alfred Correll Hadley. For services to the community in St. Vincent.
- Ho Hung-chiu, MB, BS, Senior Specialist (Radiology), Hong Kong.
- Alister Norris Hughes. For public services in Grenada.
- George Charles Jarvis, Assistant Director, Central Office, Overseas Audit Department.
- Vernon Cecil Wordsworth Kenyon, lately Commissioner of Lands, Aden.
- James Cliviston King, Permanent Secretary, Ministry of Agriculture and Fisheries, Barbados.
- Bernard Mellor, Registrar, Hong Kong University.
- William Stirling Purvis. For public services in Bermuda.
- Eustace Henry Reis, Director of Posts and Telecommunications, British Guiana.
- Clarence Augustus Seignoret, Principal Secretary to the Chief Minister, Dominica.
- James Owen Talbot-Phibbs, Colonial Treasurer, St. Helena.
- George Calvin Hamilton Thomas, Permanent Secretary to the Chief Minister and Ministry of Trade and Production, Montserrat.
- David Charles Treffry, Permanent Secretary, Ministry of Finance, Federation of South Arabia. For voluntary social work.
- Edward Waddington, MBE, Secretary to the Cabinet, Basutoland.
- Desmond Vere Watler, JP, Assistant Administrator, Cayman Islands.
- Frederick William White. For services to the Falkland Islands.
- Zolton Wisinger, MD, Medical Superintendent, Mental Hospital, lately Medical Officer, Antigua.
- Evan Thomson Wood, ISO, JP. For public services in Turks and Caicos Islands.
- Yung Chi-tung, Pro-Vice-Chancellor, Chinese University of Hong Kong.
- Faustino John Zuniga. For public services in British Honduras.

==== Member of the Order of the British Empire (MBE) ====
Military Division

Royal Navy

- Engineer Lieutenant Commander (O/E) Norval William Edward Bowen (now Retired).
- Lieutenant Commander Henry John Cecil Bridger (now Retired).
- Lieutenant Commander Malcolm Keith Burley.
- Lieutenant Commander Arthur Sydney Carpenter (for services with the British Joint Services Training Team, Ghana).
- Lieutenant Commander (SD) (C) Charles Henry Cox.
- Lieutenant Commander John Salter Drane, DSC.
- Engineer Lieutenant Commander (ME) Edward William Endacott.
- Supply Lieutenant (S) Michael Farrell (now retired).
- Lieutenant Commander John Stephen Humphreys.
- Acting Surgeon Commander John Roger Lawrance-Owen (serving with the British Joint Services Training Team, Ghana).
- Instructor Lieutenant Commander Maximilian Marston, DSC.
- Engineer Lieutenant Commander (A/O) Edward James Mills (now Retired).
- Lieutenant (SL) (O) Brian James Munday.
- Lieutenant Commander James Robert Joseph Rutherford.
- Lieutenant Commander (SCC) William James Rutter, Royal Naval Reserve.
- Captain (SD) Norman Ezra Thackeray, Royal Marines.

Army

- 23774221 Warrant Officer Class I Alfred George Andrews, Corps of Royal Military Police, Territorial Army.
- Major Harry Ashton (190808), Royal Regiment of Artillery.
- 22544873 Warrant Officer Class II Barry Edward Bateman, Corps of Royal Electrical and Mechanical Engineers, Territorial Army.
- 22297812 Warrant Officer Class I John Bell, Royal Corps of Transport, Territorial Army.
- Captain (Quartermaster) Frank Arthur Dennis Betts (454115), Coldstream Guards.
- Major Dudley Bower Carnie (420797), Royal Corps of Signals.
- Lieutenant-Colonel (local) Gerald George Carter (372605), Corps of Royal Engineers, formerly on loan to the Government of Malaysia.
- Major Robert Stormont Cathmoir (220349), Royal Corps of Signals.
- Major (Quartermaster) Richard William Connell (432600), 2nd King Edward VII's Own Gurkha Rifles (The Sirmoor Rifles).
- Lieutenant (Quartermaster) Bernard Cecil Dane (478543), Royal Army Ordnance Corps.
- Major (Quartermaster) Jack Frederick Davey, TD (388616), Royal Army Medical Corps, Territorial Army.
- Major Archibald James McNicol Davidson, TD (87745), The Cameronians (Scottish Rifles), Territorial Army.
- 5385223 Warrant Officer Class I Frederick Henry Dolby, MM, King's Own Yorkshire Light Infantry.
- 22442394 Warrant Officer Class I John James Elliott, Royal Corps of Signals.
- Captain (Quartermaster) James Ellison (469313), The Staffordshire Regiment (The Prince of Wales's).
- Captain Patrick Feltrim Fagan (445850), Corps of Royal Engineers.
- Major Kenneth William Ferrier (365602), Royal Army Educational Corps.
- Captain (Quartermaster) Frank Stanley Field (452191), The South Wales Borderers.
- Lieutenant (O.E.O.) Bertram Melville Gibson Fordham (479134), Royal Army Ordnance Corps, formerly on loan to the Government of Malaysia.
- Major (acting) John Forrester (310143), Army Cadet Force.
- Captain Albert William French (417577), Royal Corps of Signals, Territorial Army.
- Major Kenneth Thomas French (237945), Royal Corps of Transport.
- Captain (Quartermaster) Alexander Alan Cuthbertson Glass (452613), The Black Watch (Royal Highland Regiment).
- Major Donald Cecil Glass (268120), The Parachute Regiment, Territorial Army.
- Major (Quartermaster) Henry Ernest Harrison (358854), Corps of Royal Engineers.
- Major Benjamin James Harrold (406567), Royal Corps of Transport.
- Major John Guy Frederick Head (360126), Irish Guards.
- Major (Quartermaster) Robert George Holmes, MM (304885), Queen's Own Highlanders (Seaforth and Camerons).
- Captain (Quartermaster) Joseph Hughes (467703), Scots Guards.
- Major Michael Warren Jenkins (364693), Corps of Royal Engineers.
- Major (Quartermaster) Alfred Samuel Norton Jones (301171), Corps of Royal Engineers.
- Major Christopher Leo Heeler, TD (243334), Intelligence Corps, Territorial Army.
- 22271801 Warrant Officer Class II George Edward Kirk, BEM, The South Staffordshire Regiment, Territorial Army.
- 555524 Warrant Officer Class I Alfred Ernest Knight, 16th/5th The Queen's Royal Lancers.
- Major (acting) Bernard Lampard, TD (148018), Combined Cadet Force.
- 798875 Warrant Officer Class II Henry Thomas Lewery, Royal Regiment of Artillery, Territorial Army.
- Captain David Michael Longbottom (430367), The Lancashire Regiment (Prince of Wales's Volunteers).
- 3447690 Warrant Officer Class I (acting) Samuel Lowe, MM, Grenadier Guards.
- Major (temporary) Myrtle Ethel Maclagan (192442), Women's Royal Army Corps.
- Captain (Quartermaster) William Lancelot Arthur Nash (449896), Grenadier Guards.
- 22241973 Warrant Officer Class II William Albert Newbold, Corps of Royal Electrical and Mechanical Engineers, Territorial Army.
- Major Brian Anthony Hewson Parritt (420902), Intelligence Corps.
- Major (temporary) George Pearson (343839), Corps of Royal Electrical and Mechanical Engineers, formerly serving with British Army Training Team in Kenya.
- Captain (Quartermaster) Chrysosthom Joseph Pugh (469778), 1st The Queen's Dragoon Guards.
- Major (acting) John Ramsay (332420), Army Cadet Force.
- Captain (Quartermaster) Frank Charles Taylor (470975), Corps of Royal Engineers.
- Captain (temporary) Russel Reginald Theobald (474776), Corps of Royal Engineers.
- Captain (Brevet Major) George Lynn Thomas, TD (251306), Royal Regiment of Artillery, Territorial Army.
- Major (Quartermaster) Samuel Vernon (265511), Royal Corps of Signals.
- 22304806 Warrant Officer Class II Thomas William Ward, BEM, The Royal Lincolnshire Regiment, Territorial Army.
- 58782 Warrant Officer Class I Alan Watson, The Royal Highland Fusiliers (Princess Margaret's Own Glasgow and Ayrshire Regiment).
- Lieutenant Mark Alan Gervase Watts (475257), King's Shropshire Light Infantry.
- Major (Quartermaster) Sidney Charles William Weller, MM (426507), The Middlesex Regiment (Duke of Cambridge's Own).
- 22511699 Warrant Officer Class I Harry William Westgate, The Loyal Regiment (North Lancashire), Territorial Army.
- Captain (Quartermaster) Donald McNab Whyte (452770), Scots Guards.
- Lieutenant Thomas Wilson (480206), Royal Army Ordnance Corps.
- Captain Michael Charles Wotton, MB (467938), Royal Army Medical Corps.
- Captain John Wright (465389), Army Catering Corps.

Overseas Awards

- Captain Ralph Joseph Dolby, British Contract Officer, Nigerian Army.
- Major Leslie Mark Weinstock, Nigerian Army.
- Wakil Qaid Royal Lakin Bunney, Federal National Guard, Aden.
- Warrant Officer Class I Horace Gibbons, Bermuda Militia Artillery.

Royal Air Force

- Squadron Leader John Greenwood Alderson (53502).
- Squadron Leader Anthony Hugh Currey Back, AFC, (2608191).
- Squadron Leader Douglas John Barnes (54426).
- Squadron Leader Barnet Charles Swinton-Bland (203760).
- Squadron Leader Kenneth Patrick Cater (51437).
- Squadron Leader Henry David Costain (143384).
- Squadron Leader David Leslie Coveney (2680545).
- Squadron Leader Denis Joseph Cullen (196903).
- Squadron Leader John Robert Dolby (145437).
- Squadron Leader Eric John Downs (170741).
- Squadron Leader Walter Adam Patrick Holmes (48258).
- Squadron Leader Henry Silvester Horth, AFC (164232).
- Squadron Leader Dennis Percy Francis McCaig, AFC (155772) (Retired).
- Squadron Leader Raymond McDonald MacDonald (2267679).
- Squadron Leader James Jamieson McNair (154659).
- Squadron Leader Raymond Horace Morley (198968).
- Squadron Leader Thomas Means Stafford (153516).
- Squadron Leader Jack Stirrup (3504503).
- Squadron Leader Cyril Ormond Thatcher (916057).
- Squadron Leader Waldemar Warhaftig (706711).
- Squadron Leader John Frederick Williams (591240).
- Squadron Leader John David Willson (2574530).
- Acting Squadron Leader Dudley William Coombes (502114).
- Acting Squadron Leader Joseph Skilling Robertson (176530), Royal Air Force Volunteer Reserve (Training Branch).
- Acting Squadron Leader William Harry Sheppard (181361).
- Flight Lieutenant Charles Edward Deacon (633877).
- Flight Lieutenant Brian Edgar Lamming (583563).
- Flight Lieutenant Douglas Herbert Offiler (504717).
- Flight Lieutenant Tom Olliver (572256).
- Flight Lieutenant Kenneth Roland Marcus Remfry (197835).
- Flight Lieutenant Cyril James Smith (59112).
- Flight Lieutenant Geoffrey Norman Stevenson (553647).
- Flight Lieutenant George William Thorn (57581).
- Flight Lieutenant John Watt (4000755).
- Flight Lieutenant Donald James Robert Willis (3050559).
- Flying Officer George Alexander Newton (2419013).
- Warrant Officer James John Brown (Y0564537).
- Warrant Officer Thomas Coon (M0517791).
- Warrant Officer Ronald Dillon (W0543009).
- Warrant Officer Albert Doxey (C0533086).
- Warrant Officer Edward Raymond Gibbons (V0955972), Royal Air Force Regiment.
- Warrant Officer John Gould (N0524935).
- Warrant Officer Norman Horsley Gray (N0520815).

Civil Division

- Harry William Ackers, Surveyor, Board of Customs and Excise.
- Digby Richard Maurice Ackland, Grade 6 Officer, HM Diplomatic Service.
- Philip Henry Stephen Adams, Officer-in-Charge Production Control, 27 Command Workshop, Ministry of Defence (Army).
- Frederick Ahl, lately Communications Officer Grade I, Ministry of Aviation Radio Station, Gloucestershire.
- Joan Nancy Ainsworth, Clerical Officer (Secretary), Department of Economic Affairs.
- Crawford Lawrence Maynard Alford. For political and public services in Anglesey.
- John Cameron Allan, Superintendent and Deputy Chief Constable, Dunbartonshire Constabulary.
- Ivor John Allchurch. For services to Association Football in Wales.
- Christopher Robert Allcorn, National Union of Agricultural Workers' Organiser for Hertfordshire and the Lea Valley.
- Margaret Stewart Annand, Grade 6 Officer, HM Diplomatic Service.
- Jack Armson, District Commissioner for National Savings, East Midland Region, National Savings Committee.
- Herbert Charles Ash, Supervisor, Marketing Administration Department, National Benzole Company Ltd.
- Edward Ashcroft, BEM, Chief Rescue Officer, Civil Defence Corps, Nottinghamshire.
- Thomas Ashton, Chairman, Portland Training College for the Disabled, Mansfield.
- Willie Auty. For political and public services in Scunthorpe.
- Dorothy Eileen Ball, Principal Sister, HM Prison Wormwood Scrubs, Home Office.
- James Henry Balsom, Higher Executive Officer, London Postal Region, General Post Office.
- Margaret Helen Barker, Headmistress, Northumberland Village Homes.
- Thomas Joseph Bartlett, Honorary Secretary, Eastleigh Savings Committee.
- Helen Armitage Battye, County Organiser, Hertfordshire, Women's Voluntary Service.
- Sydney Arthur Beck, Clerical Assistant, Ministry of Aviation.
- William Beck. For political and public services in Consett.
- James William Bedford, JP. For political and public services in Yorkshire.
- William Hamilton Bell, JP, DL. For political and public services in Lanarkshire.
- Alfred Archie Bickerstaffe, Executive Officer, Ministry of Transport.
- Marion Birch, Matron, Westow Croft Maternity Hospital, York.
- Frank Bishop, Chairman, Sittingbourne Local Employment Committee.
- Kathleen Moira Vaughan Black, Higher Executive Officer, Ministry of Technology.
- Edgar Stanley Bolton. For political and public services in Barnes.
- Alderman Alfred James Bown. For political and public services in Swindon.
- Frederic Holliday Bowser, lately Member, Lincolnshire (Holland) Agricultural Executive Committee.
- James Charles Braben, Senior Executive Officer, Ministry of Defence (Royal Air Force).
- Arthur Henry Bradbury, Potteries Liaison Officer, Ministry of Public Building and Works.
- Samuel John Bradley, District Inspector, Royal Ulster Constabulary.
- Philip Charles Branwhite, lately Senior Executive Officer, Ministry of Pensions and National Insurance.
- Derek Francis James Brebner, Experimental Officer, Royal Air Force Institute of Aviation Medicine, Ministry of Defence (Royal Air Force).
- Captain Peter Edward Bressey, Senior Captain, British European Airways.
- Captain Stanley John Bristow, lately Master, MV Arthur Albright, James Fisher & Sons Ltd.
- The Reverend William Andrew Broadbent (Brother Philip), Social Welfare Officer, St. Ninian's Boys' School, Gartmore, Stirlingshire.
- Joyce Brocklebank, Shorthand Typist, Grade I, Careers Information Centre, Liverpool, Ministry of Defence (Royal Air Force).
- Leonard Armitage Brook, Chairman, No. 96 (Dewsbury) Squadron Committee, Air Training Corps.
- Arthur William Brown, Editor, Linlithgow Journal & Gazette.
- Rosa Mary Buckley, District Nurse and Midwife, School Nurse and Health Visitor, Shropshire.
- Alfred Jesse Buckwell, Higher Executive Officer, Board of Trade.
- Reginald William Bullock, Technical Class Grade B, Ministry of Defence (Royal Navy).
- Victor Basil Bunting, Departmental Specialist, Government Communications Headquarters.
- Mary Patricia Burgess, Secretary to the City Architect and Planning Officer, Coventry.
- Frederick William Burnett, Area Manager, St. Helens, National Assistance Board.
- Alice Miriam Martha Burrell. For political and public services in Leyton.
- Frederick James Burtles, Chief Press Officer, Ministry of Public Building and Works.
- Martha Button. For political and public services in Barnsley.
- Audrey Monica Cameron, Producer, Drama Department, Sound, British Broadcasting Corporation.
- Leslie Carrington, Secretary, Incorporated National Association of British and Irish Millers Ltd.
- Harold Victor Cass, lately Chief Public Health Inspector, Oldham County Borough.
- Alexa Phyllis Castle, Women's Voluntary Service Family Welfare Worker, attached 1/6th Queen Elizabeth's Own Gurkha Rifles.
- Wilfred Arthur Chadwick, Technical Works Officer Grade I, Road Research Laboratory, Ministry of Transport.
- William Chadwick, Assistant Chief Officer, Hampshire Fire Brigade.
- Gladys Grace Challenor, Honorary Divisional Treasurer, Abingdon British Red Cross Society.
- William Harry Challis, Signal Engineer, London Transport Board.
- Elsie Mary Chaplin, Editorial Secretary, The Builder.
- William Cheeseman, Local Secretary, Chatham, Royal Naval Benevolent Trust.
- David Green Christie, lately Chief Draughtsman, Ship Drawing Office, Thermotank Ltd., Glasgow.
- Harold Rowland Chubb, Resettlement Officer, Western Region, British Railways Board.
- Helen Hume Churchill, lately Higher Executive Officer, County Courts Branch, Lord Chancellor's Department.
- Dorothy Henrietta Charlotte Clarke, JP. For political and public services in Luton.
- Sydney George Clarke. For political and public services.
- Arthur Lewis Clements, BEM, Postal Superintendent, South Eastern District Office, General Post Office.
- Irene Mary Clift, Member, Regional Staff (Children and Family Welfare) London Region, Women's Voluntary Service.
- James Cole, JP. For political and public services in Bournemouth.
- Douglas Richard Keeler Coleman, Senior Experimental Officer, Radiochemical Centre, Amersham, United Kingdom Atomic Energy Authority.
- Alderman George Edward Connell. For political and public services in Barrow-in-Furness.
- Mary Melvill Constable, Clerical Officer (Secretary), Ministry of Agriculture, Fisheries and Food.
- George Fearnley Cook. For political and public services in Millom.
- Winefred Evelyn Coombes, Grade 4 Officer, Ministry of Labour.
- Florence Eva Dorothy Bassett-Cooper, Temporary Clerical Assistant, Ministry of Agriculture, Fisheries and Food.
- Rosemary Cooper, Editorial executive, Vogue, Conde Nast Ltd. For services to Export.
- Harold Henry Coqte, Chairman, Merton and Epsom and District War Pensions Committee.
- Francis George Coppage, Regional Collector or Taxes, Board, of Inland Revenue.
- George Sydney Cottee, Higher Executive Officer, Ministry of Pensions and National Insurance.
- William John Cotton, Member, White Fish Authority Advisory Council.
- Edward Fenwick Cowley, Chief Telecommunications Superintendent, Lancaster, General Post Office.
- Frances Elisabeth Cox, Assistant Welfare Officer, Ministry of Housing and Local Government.
- Helen Reid Cox, lately Adviser and Assistant Teacher of Mathematics, The Lindsay High School, Bathgate.
- George Woods Evers Crabtree, Chairman, Sowerby Bridge Local Employment Committee.
- Sydney Crawley, Head Postmaster, Weston-super-Mare.
- Gerald Victor Crossley, Senior Experimental Officer, Board of Trade.
- Phyllis Culpan, Principal Matron, Burnley-Hospital Management Committee.
- The Reverend Arthur Thomas Dangerfield, Chairman, Holmfirth Savings Committee.
- Philip Kevin Davies, Officer, Board of Customs and Excise.
- Thomas Davies, Headmaster, Llanfihangel Cwmdu Voluntary Primary School, Breconshire.
- Stanley Thomas Davis, Secretary, Cheltenham Hospital Group Management Committee.
- Phyllis Dawley, lately Headmistress, Roseville County Secondary School for Girls, Leeds.
- Reginald Walter Dawson, JP, Chief Warden, Civil Defence Corps, Coventry.
- Squadron Leader Alan Wilfrid Day, Secretary, Aerodrome Owners' Association.
- Frances Mary Dean, Organiser, Training and Education Department, National Association for Mental Health.
- Charles Frank Dennett, Divisional Officer Grade I, London Fire Brigade.
- Joseph Frederick Dickinson, Chief Warden, Civil Defence Corps, West Hartlepool.
- James Dixon, Founder and voluntary leader, Athan Boys' Club, Walthamstow.
- John Vernon Dring, Chairman, North Lindsey District Committee of Lincolnshire (Lindsey) Agricultural Executive Committee.
- Nancy Ida Duncan, Clerical Officer (Secretary), HM Diplomatic Service.
- Howard Herbert Samuel Earney, Technical Class Grade I, Aeroplane and Armament Experimental Establishment, Ministry of Aviation.
- Frederick Charles Edlin, Technical Grade I (Construction), Ministry of Public Building and Works.
- Herbert John Edwards, Honorary Secretary, Sailors' Home, Aberdeen, British Sailors' Society.
- Owen Edwards, JP. For political and public services in Merionethshire.
- Wilfred Lionel Edwards, Calligrapher.
- William Reginald Edwards, Honorary Secretary, Ramsey (Isle of Man) Life-boat Station.
- Captain Robin Fogg Elliot, DL, retired Officer, Grade III, Regimental Headquarters, The Gordon Highlanders, Ministry of Defence (Army).
- John Herbert Ellis, DSC. For services to the fishing industry.
- Llewelyn Ellis, Clerk and Chief Financial Officer, Deudraeth Rural District Council, Merionethshire.
- Frederick George Emmison, County Archivist, Essex County Council.
- Eric George Evans, Assistant to the Electrical Engineer, Euston, British Railways Board.
- Gertrude Ena Evans, Deputy Manager, Employment Exchange, Liverpool, Ministry of Labour.
- Samuel George Ewing, JP, Provost of Jedburgh, Roxburghshire.
- James Robert Fairgrieve, General Manager, Reed Corrugated Cases Ltd. Warrenpoint, County Down.
- Winifred Mary Faller, Honorary Secretary, Penarth Savings Committee.
- Judah Julius Feder, Export Manager, Crypto. Ltd. For services to Export.
- Frederick Fildes, Works Manager, Fire Control Department, Ferranti Ltd., Manchester.
- Phyllis Finch, Staff Welfare Officer, Ministry of Labour.
- Lilian Fitt, Temporary Clerk—B Grade, Ministry of Defence (Royal Navy).
- Elsie Formby, Matron, Star and Garter Home for Disabled Sailors, Soldiers and Airmen.
- Commander Robert Wilkinson Forster, RD, RNR (Retired), lately District Superintendent, North East District, Mercantile Marine Office, Board of Trade.
- Phyllis Ada Kate Francis, Health Visitor and School Nurse, Wiltshire.
- Nellie Longridge Freeman, County Organiser, Isle of Wight, Women's Voluntary Service.
- Rosalinde Ivy Fuller. For services to the British Council.
- Charles Henry Gardiner, Clerk, Evesham Rural District Council.
- James Alexander Gaston, JP. For public services in County Antrim.
- Thomas Rae Gaylor, Assistant-Chief Constable, Worcestershire.
- Jemima Geekie, Senior Executive Officer, Forestry Commission (Scotland).
- Mary Ellen Gilmartin, Staff Officer, Ministry of Education for Northern Ireland.
- Reginald Henry Glaysher, Assistant Engineer, Supply and Transport Branch, Home Office.
- Mabel Gould, Higher Executive Officer, General Register Office.
- William Graham, JP, Member, Chester-le-Street Rural District Council, County Durham.
- Woodrow Graham, JP, Honorary Secretary, County Down Savings Committee.
- Donald Barren Grant, BEM, Chairman, North of Scotland War Pensions Committee.
- Algernon John Robert Greaves, Dean's Verger, Westminster Abbey.
- Marjorie Audrey Greenhough, Senior Executive Officer, Ministry of Pensions and National Insurance.
- Charles Richard Samuel Gregory, Horticultural Advisory Officer, Grade III, Ministry of Agriculture, Fisheries, and Food.
- Ralph Clayton Griffiths, Consulting Director, Salt & Son Ltd., Surgical Appliance Manufacturers.
- John Notman Hamilton, MB, ChB, lately General Medical Practitioner, Levenwick, Shetland.
- Edward Hammersley, JP, North-West Midlands District Secretary, Amalgamated Society of Woodworkers.
- Edward Cecil Harley, Chief Engineer, THV Winston Churchill, Corporation of Trinity House.
- Charles William Harris. For political and public services in Leominster.
- Mary Harris, Controller of Typists, Board of Trade.
- Reginald Gilbert James Harris, Organist, Gloucester Prison Chapel.
- Alfred Edward Harrison, Senior Executive Officer, Ministry of Pensions and National Insurance.
- Job Enoch Harrison, Honorary Secretary, Wigan Savings Committee.
- Bernard George Hart, Staff Officer, Board of Inland Revenue.
- Gladys Marea Hartman, Honorary Secretary, Women's Amateur Athletic Association.
- Gilbert Harvey, Member, Walsall Hospital Management Committee.
- Walter Douglas Hatcher, Senior Assistant, Maintenance Co-ordination, Television, British Broadcasting Corporation.
- Abraham Hauser. For public services and work for the Jewish community in South Wales.
- Kate Hayens, Chairman, Dundee Old People's Welfare Committee.
- Raymond Harland Hayes, Archaeological Photographer.
- Johannah Healey, Ward Sister, Whittingham Hospital, Preston.
- James Bowman Hendry, Woods Manager, Atholl Estates.
- William Roy John Harding Kenwood, lately Assistant Naval Store Officer, Ministry of Defence (Royal Navy).
- James Henry Hessey, JP, Chairman, Blackpool, Fylde and District War Pensions Committee.
- Cecil Leonard Hicks, New Work Engineer, Steel, Peech & Tozer (Branch of The United Steel Companies Ltd.).
- Bernard Albert Higgins, Senior Courier, Ministry of Defence (Royal Navy).
- Ronald Wesley Hobbah, Senior Engineer, Cable & Wireless Ltd.
- Samuel Hodgson, Welfare Services Officer, Cumberland County Council.
- Thomas Rowland Hodgson, Honorary Secretary, Mablethorpe and Sutton Savings Committee.
- Nettie Helen Honywill, Clerical Officer (Secretary), Scottish Development Department.
- Norman Wilfrid Hook, lately Chief Clerk, Council of Legal Education.
- Jessie Mary Horsburgh, Headmistress, Sherwood County Primary School, Mitcham, Surrey.
- Henry William Furse Hoskyns. For services to British Fencing.
- Anne Robinson Howieson, Senior Experimental Officer, Waltham Abbey Explosives Research and Development Establishment, Ministry of Aviation.
- Gwyneth Clare Huelin, Deputy, Parish of St. Brelade, Jersey.
- Frank Hutchinson, Assistant Manager, Wheel Machine Shop, Taylor Brothers & Company Ltd., Manchester.
- Fred Iliffe, lately Registrar of Births, Deaths and Marriages, Brixworth Registration Sub-District.
- Lieutenant-Colonel George William Holt Innes, Administrative Officer, British Travel Association.
- Joseph Innes, lately General Manager, Edinburgh Savings Bank.
- John Ironside, 1st Electrical Officer, SS Himalaya, Peninsular & Orient Steam Navigation Company.
- Charles Llewellyn Jaggs-Jackson, Clerical Officer, Royal Air Force, St. Mawgan, Ministry of Defence (Royal Air Force).
- Leonard Jackson. For political and public services in Stoke-on-Trent.
- Eric Parker Jagger, Senior Driving Examiner, Liverpool (Waterloo) Driving Test Centre, Ministry of Transport.
- Annie May Jeffery, lately Honorary Secretary, Welwyn Savings Committee.
- Rae Jenkins, Orchestral Conductor.
- Trevor Jenkins, Fire Service Officer Grade I, Headquarters, Far East Air Force, Ministry of Defence (Royal Air Force).
- Alexander George Jenson, Senior Assistant Land Commissioner, Agricultural Land Service, Ministry of Agriculture, Fisheries and Food.
- Elvira Lucy Hawkins Johnson, Chairman, Croydon Borough Street Groups Savings Sub-Committee.
- Squadron Leader Louis George Johnson, DFC, Past President, Pathfinder Association.
- Cecil Edward Jones, lately Higher Executive Officer, Ministry of Power.
- Ivor Jones, Inspector of Taxes (Higher Grade), Board of Inland Revenue.
- Mervyn Benjamin Jones, National Honorary Treasurer, British Limbless Ex-Servicemen's Association.
- Thomas Jury, Registry Clerk, House of Lords.
- Ann Mary Caroline Kahn, Honorary Secretary, Civil Service Sailing Association.
- Observer Commander Eric Gordon John William Kent, Group Commandant, No. 4 Group, Royal Observer Corps.
- Muriel Newman Kerr, Personal Assistant to the General Administrator, Royal Opera House, Covent Garden.
- Captain Donald Joseph Lafferty, General Secretary, Royal Alfred Merchant Seamen's Society.
- Francis Lagan, District Inspector, Royal Ulster Constabulary.
- Cuthbert Walter Lane, Chief Production Engineer, Ransome & Maries Bearing Company Ltd., Newark.
- Helena Nellie Lane, Senior Executive Officer, Ministry of Overseas Development.
- Wilfred Baden Lane, Chairman and Managing Director, Rapid Magnetic Ltd., Birmingham. For services to Export.
- Ida Gwendoline Latham, Operating Theatre Superintendent, London Hospital.
- George Stanley Latimer, Deputy Principal, Ministry of Commerce for Northern Ireland.
- Captain John Laws, MC. For services to the British Legion in Lincoln and the East Midlands.
- Lily Gertrude Annie Lawton. For voluntary social services in Yorkshire.
- John Alfred Leach. For services to Table Tennis.
- Richard Ceiriog Lewis, Detective Chief Superintendent, Metropolitan Police.
- James Augustus John Liddall. For political and public services in Somerset.
- Stanley Cecil Lightbody, Engineer Technical Grade I, Directorate of Stores and Clothing, Ministry of Defence (Army).
- John Henry Lill. For political and public services in Dewsbury.
- Thomas Lowe, Industrial Relations Officer, British Railways Board.
- Joseph McCluskey, Clerical Officer, Ministry of Pensions and National Insurance.
- Alfred William Macdonald, Principal Probation Officer, Renfrewshire Combined Probation Committee.
- Alan Landale MacFarlane, Road Safety Officer, City of Manchester.
- Peter Stewart Duff Macfarlane, Ophthalmic Optician, Edinburgh.
- James McHugh, Head of Commerce Department, York Central College of Further Education.
- Mary Clare MacManus, lately Temporary Executive Officer, Ministry of Defence (Central).
- Daniel Alfred McMullan, Past Chairman, Portrush Sea Cadet Corps Unit Committee.
- Beattie McNeill, MD, JP, Chairman, Castlederg-Drumquin Area (County Tyrone) Savings Committee.
- Beatrice Elizabeth Dear McOrist, Senior Nursing Sister, HM Prison and Borstal Institution, Greenock, Renfrewshire.
- Jean Roberts Cormack McVean, lately Group Catering Officer, Atomic Energy Research Establishment, Harwell.
- Howard Edward Main, Works Manager, Abingdon King Dick Ltd., Birmingham.
- Marjorie Mayo, Higher Executive Officer, Ministry of Defence (Royal Air Force).
- Robert Arnold Meadows, ERD, Inspector of Taxes (Higher Grade), Board of Inland Revenue.
- Ernest Arthur Melling, General Secretary, National Federation of Old Age Pensions Associations.
- Leslie Charles Merrion. For political and public services in Enfield.
- Thomas Lees Midwood, Chief Staff Welfare Officer, National Assistance Board.
- Wright Watts Miller, Senior Information Officer, Central Office of Information.
- George Harold Mills, Veterinary Officer, Ministry of Agriculture, Fisheries and Food.
- Albert Edward Mitchell, Senior Executive Officer, Metropolitan Police.
- Charles James Shelbourne Mitchell, Area Land Agent (Army), London District, Ministry of Defence (Army).
- Ronald Archibald Mitchell, Senior Executive Officer, Ministry of Defence (Royal Navy).
- Gladys Ella Moger, Senior Executive Officer, Board of Customs and Excise.
- George Eric Moseley, Senior Experimental Officer, Institute of Animal Physiology, Cambridge.
- Arthur Norman Murchie, Shipping and Distribution Manager, British Titan Products Company Ltd. For services to Export.
- Mary Adelaide Murgatroyd, lately Headmistress, Undercliffe County Infants School, Bradford.
- John Rothwell Nabb, Chief Officer, Stockport Fire Brigade.
- Allen Edward Naylor. For political and public services in Rutland and Stamford.
- Thomas Shore Neville, Engineer (Inspecting), Crown Agents for Oversea Governments and Administrations.
- Florence Jane Newman, Centre Organiser, Nuneaton, Women's Voluntary Service.
- Henry Basil Newman. For services to the Boys Brigade in Ipswich and District.
- Thomas Nisbet, Generation Engineer for Sloy/Awe group of stations, North of Scotland Hydro-Electric Board.
- George Haydn Nowell, Senior Executive Officer, Ministry of Health.
- William O'Connor, Experimental Officer, Ministry of Aviation.
- Walter John Owen, Export Relations Manager, Office of Director of Car & Truck Group, Ford Motor Company Ltd. For services to Export.
- Sidney James Page. For political and public services in Exeter.
- Alderman Harry Frederick Parker, JP. For political and public services in Sussex.
- Richard James Parker, Air Traffic Control Officer Grade II, Liverpool, Ministry of Aviation.
- Marjorie Heather Constance Parks, Executive Officer, Ministry of Technology.
- Guy Richmond Parry. For services to the Boy Scouts Association in Andover.
- Peter Wilfrid Paskell, Principal Probation Officer, Nottinghamshire.
- James Paterson, Member, Lanarkshire Local Savings Committee.
- John Graves-Peirce, Duty Officer, British Broadcasting Corporation.
- Squadron Leader Victor Allan Pengilley, Civil Defence Officer, Worcestershire.
- Walter Eugene Phelp, lately Secretary, Fire Offices Committee (Foreign).
- Alderman Frank Phelps. For political and public services in Gloucester.
- Gwendoline May Phillips, Superintendent of Typists, Ministry of Pensions and National Insurance.
- Harold Edgar Thomas Phillips, Honorary Secretary, Luton and District Industrial Safety Association.
- Sidney Pitham, Senior Executive Engineer, Engineering Department, Goonhilly Radio Station, Cornwall, General Post Office.
- Edward William Pointing, lately Technical Grade I (Construction), Ministry of Public Building and Works.
- Herbert James Ponsford, Chief Superintendent, Warwickshire Constabulary. Director of Professional Studies, Police College.
- Commander Gerald Gordon Portch, RD, RNR (Retired), Sales Engineer, Equipments Rectifier Division, Westinghouse Brake & Signal Company Ltd.
- William Poulton, Leader writer, Newcastle Journal.
- Emily Poxton. For political and public services in Hemsworth.
- Jack Prescott, Area Engineer, London Telecommunications Region, General Post Office.
- Kenneth Prince, Assistant Chief Engineer, Gas Cooled Reactors Directorate, United Kingdom Atomic Energy Authority.
- Leonard Montague Pusey, Chief Draughtsman, Engineering Department, London, General Post Office.
- Helen Brumwell Ramage, General Secretary, Scottish Women's Rural Institutes.
- Harvey Rawding, Manager, Inspection Department, Jessop-Saville Ltd.
- Richard George Read, Assistant Accountant I, Independent Television Authority.
- Herbert Brocklesby Richardson, Secretary and Finance Officer, Land Settlement Association Ltd.
- John Serjeant Richardson, Outside Broadcasts Group Organiser, Television, British Broadcasting Corporation.
- Gladys Roberts, Manager, Employment Exchange, Llangollen, Ministry of Labour.
- Mary Roberts, Secretary, Institute of Quarrying.
- John Charles Rowett, Senior Grade Draughtsman, Ordnance Survey.
- Marjorie Alice Roy, lately Clerical Officer, HM Stationery Office.
- Donald Bucknall Saunders, Assistant Manager, Construction Equipment Division, Marshall Group of Companies of Gainsborough, Lincolnshire and Leeds. For services to Export.
- William Schofield, lately Senior Executive Officer, Ministry of Defence (Army).
- William John Schollar, lately Principal Supervisor of Aircraft Repair, Llangennech, Ministry of Defence (Royal Navy).
- Arthur George Walter Sellwood, Deputy Assistant Chief Officer, London Fire Brigade.
- Walter Sharpe, Area Production Manager, No. 6 Area, East Midlands Division, National Coal Board.
- Charles John Edward Shears, Engineer/ Technician I, HM Diplomatic Service.
- Alfred Solomon Shock, Secretary, Fisher and Ludlow Sick and Dividend Society and Benevolent Fund.
- William Silcock, Higher Technical "B", Ministry of Public Building and Works.
- David Gumming Simpson, Technical Director, Powered Prosthetic Unit, Orthopaedic Department, University of Edinburgh.
- George Keen Simpson. For public services in Oxfordshire.
- John Downie Hunter Simpson, Member, National Savings Committee for Scotland.
- Norah Patricia Slattery, Milk Officer Grade II, Norwich, Ministry of Agriculture, Fisheries and Food.
- James Rowland Smith, Drainage and Water Supply Officer, Grade I, Ministry of Agriculture, Fisheries and Food.
- Malcolm Andrew Smith, Burgh Factor, Paisley.
- Walter William Smith, Regional Electrical Engineer, Midlands Region, Central Electricity Generating Board.
- Thomas Scott Soutar, Sheriff Clerk Depute at Glasgow.
- George Herbert Sparks, Senior Executive Officer, HM Treasury.
- Joseph Gilbert Sparks, Chief Superintendent, Liverpool City Police.
- James George Charles Spellacy, Senior Sales Superintendent, Telephone Manager's Office, Cambridge, General Post Office.
- Dora Gwendoline Strawbridge, Vice-President, Lewisham Borough Savings Committee.
- William Brown Gloag Strawbridge, Outside Engineer Manager, Alexander Stephen & Sons Ltd., Glasgow.
- Geoffrey Roy Sudell, Deputy Controller, Telecommunications Group, Berlin, Ministry of Defence (Army).
- Francis Harry Ashley Taft, Centre Manager, Long Eaton Government Training Centre and Industrial Rehabilitation Unit, Ministry of Labour.
- Charles John Tait, General Secretary, Scottish Association of Boys' Clubs.
- Agnes Elizabeth Taylor, JP. For political and public services in Cheshire.
- James Henry Taylor, JP. For political and public services in Redditch.
- Maureen Taylor, Councillor, Billingham Urban District Council, County Durham.
- Ernest Henry Thomas, Director and General Manager (Airfield), Flight Refuelling Ltd.
- George Hugh Thompson, Superintendent, Ordnance Survey, Ministry of Finance for Northern Ireland.
- George Johnson Thompson, Senior Experimental Officer, Laboratory Steward, Freshwater Biological Association.
- William John Francis Thompson, lately Higher Executive Officer, Department of Education and Science.
- Eric Spencer Spencer-Timms, Experimental Officer, Royal Armament Research and Development Establishment, Ministry of Defence (Army).
- Reginald James Travess, JP. For political and public services in Glamorgan.
- Albert Charles Tubby, Higher Executive Officer, Ministry of Pensions and National Insurance.
- John Mary Tufigno, Civilian Welfare Officer, Air Headquarters, Malta, Ministry of Defence (Royal Air Force).
- Gertie Spinney Turk, lately Superintendent of Typists, Royal Aircraft Establishment, Farnborough, Ministry of Aviation.
- Harry Turner, lately Chief Administrative Assistant, Lancashire County Council.
- Henry Hayton Waddle, Chairman, Darlington Savings Committee.
- Elaine Flora Wale, Higher Executive Officer, HM Diplomatic Service.
- Ernest Wales, Youth Club Leader, Tyne Dock Youth Club, South Shields.
- Thomas Mervyn Llewellyn Walters. For services to the Boy Scouts Association in Leicestershire.
- Benjamin James Ward, Member, Shropshire Agricultural Executive Committee.
- George Lionel Watkins, Head of Department of Mining and Fuels, Burnley Municipal College.
- Dorothy Celia Watson, Clerical Officer (Secretary), Export Credits Guarantee Department.
- Lloyd George Watson. For political services.
- John Robert Webster, Technical Works Grade A, Marine Division, Board of Trade.
- John Thomas Weighell, BEM, JP. For political and public services in the North Riding of Yorkshire.
- Robert Rae Welsh. For services to instrumental music in Ayrshire.
- Maiid Jane Elisabeth, Lady Wenham, Special Assistant to the Chairman on Services Welfare, Women's Voluntary Service.
- Joyce Burdick West, lately Principal, Royal Victoria Patriotic School, Bedwell Park.
- Marjorie Grace Westbrook, Head of Uniform Department, Women's Voluntary Service.
- Frank Westcott, Technical Grade I (Construction), Ministry of Public Building and Works.
- Kathleen Elizabeth Olive Westwood, Vice-President, Southampton Division, Soldiers', Sailors' and Airmen's Families Association.
- Tom Whalley, Headmaster, Gallowhill School for Educationally Sub-normal Boys, Northumberland.
- Alderman Thomas Jones Williams. For services to agriculture and agricultural education.
- Arthur Whitney Wills, Higher Executive Officer, Ministry of Public Building and Works.
- Arthur George Wilson, Senior Scientific Assistant, Science Research Council, Radio and Space Research Station, Department of Education and Science.
- Thelma Edna Wilson, Superintendent of Typists, Ministry of Power.
- Vere Cicely Wilson, Chief Photographer, National Gallery, Department of Education and Science.
- Harold James Winters, Chief Draughtsman, Ministry of Defence (Royal Navy).
- Georgina Woodrow, Head Mistress, Coleraine Girls' County Secondary (Intermediate) School.
- Frank Joseph Henry Wright, Music Director, Parks Department, Greater London Council.
- Margaret Wilkinson Wylie, Grade 3 Officer, Ministry of Labour.
- Matthew John Graham Wylie, Chairman and Managing Director, Matthew Wylie & Company Ltd. For services to Export.
- William McKibben Zebedee, lately Secretary-Manager, Bennet House, Helen's Bay, County Down.

Diplomatic Service

- Bertha Joan Allen, Librarian, Institute of Administration, Ahmadu Bello University, Northern Nigeria.
- Lucy Barratt, British subject resident in the United States of America.
- Daphne Mary Patricia Blackman, Personal Assistant to Her Majesty's Ambassador, Bangkok.
- Godefer Bodilly, lately Personal Assistant to Her Majesty's Ambassador, Djakarta.
- David Michael Lacon Chastel de Boinville, Regional Information Officer, Her Majesty's Embassy, Washington.
- Clifford Donald Burnside, Air Survey Officer, Northern Nigeria.
- Rosemary Frances Byers, lately Organising Secretary, Uganda Red Cross Society.
- Winifred Agnes Julia Carey, Personal Assistant to the Counsellor (Commercial), British High Commission, Kuala Lumpur.
- Anthony Paul Ceurvorst, Second Secretary (Administration), British High Commission, Salisbury.
- George Edgar Jutland Chaney, Technical Assistance Adviser to the Ministry of Social Welfare and Co-operatives, Northern Nigeria.
- Harold Sidney Clark, lately Treasury Officer of Accounts, Uganda.
- John Rowden Davies, Superintendent of Police, Sabah Component, Royal Malaysia Police.
- Leonard John Dawson, First Secretary and Consul, Her Majesty's Embassy, San Jose.
- Rowena Dawson, Communications Officer, British Deputy High Commission, Zanzibar.
- Cecilia Double, British subject lately resident in Bolivia.
- Winefred Durbin, Second Secretary, British High Commission, Lagos.
- Phyllis Joy Edwards, Librarian to the Research Division, Ministry of Agriculture, and to the Institute of Agricultural Research, Samaru, Northern Nigeria.
- John Britton Ferguson, Chief Librarian, British Council, India.
- Andrew John Floyd. For service to the British community in Cyprus.
- Ralph Rasterlyle Fraser. For services to the British West Indian community in Cuba.
- Major Frederick Michael Gibbs. For services to the British community in Cyprus.
- Patrick Roy Gillan, Senior Stores Officer, Federal Public Service, Nigeria.
- Elsie Sylvia Gladman, Matron, British-American (Queen Victoria Memorial) Hospital, Nice.
- Sidney Cecil Grimley, Senior Superintendent of Police, Criminal Investigation Department, Uganda.
- Charles Harry Hardy, Principal Revenue Inspector, Eastern Nigeria.
- Phyllis Cater Heymann. For services to the British community in Cyprus.
- Gerald Frederick Hobbs, Deputy Superintendent, Royal Malaysia Police.
- Lilian Hopkins, British Vice-Consul, Minneapolis.
- Simon Hutchinson, Divisional Superintendent, Royal Malaysia Police, Kuching, Sarawak.
- Thurstan Roy Jones, lately Spraying Machinery Technologist, Uganda.
- Samandar Khan Kanuga, British Pro-Consul, Khorramshahr.
- Zena Francesca de Luca, British Pro-Consul, Milan.
- William McAllister, Junior Attaché, Her Majesty's Embassy, Warsaw.
- John Alastair McNiven, Colombo Plan Adviser on Data Processing, Department of Statistics, Malaysia.
- Cyril Mapp, Technical Assistance Adviser to the Commissioner of Revenue, Northern Nigeria.
- Daniel Albert Martin, Chief Equipment Engineer, Singapore Telephone Board.
- The Reverend Hubert Samuel Matthews. For services to the British community in Cyprus.
- Dorothy Grace Medway, MB, BS, lately Medical Superintendent, Palwal General Hospital, Gurgaon District, Punjab, India.
- Donald Miller, Deputy Chairman, Malaysian Tariff Advisory Board.
- Maurice Reginald Mullins. For services to British prestige in Uganda.
- The Reverend Thomas Gerard Murray. For services to education and the community in Nigeria.
- Gwynned Nicoll, Medical missionary, Anglican Mission, Sarawak, Malaysia.
- Marguerite Mary Pearce, British Vice-Consul, Funchal.
- Richard John Phillips, Travel Officer, British Government Offices, New York.
- Doreen Ann Prissick. For services to the Women's Police Force in Tanzania.
- Stanley Pusey, lately Chief Works Superintendent (Water), Northern Nigeria.
- William Peter Ramsey, British Vice-Consul, Callao.
- Hubert Gordon Richards, British subject lately resident in Angola.
- James Andrew Duncan Stewart-Robinson, Her Majesty's Consul, Boston.
- Cecilia Alice Ryder (Mother M. St. John), lately Headmistress and Mother Superior, Presentation Convent High School, Kodaikanal, South India.
- Maurice James George Saul, Superintendent, Royal Malaysia Police, Sabah.
- Alexander Bruce Boughtrigg Scott, British Vice-Consul, Cadiz.
- John Cormick Sharp, Chairman, Antwerp Branch, British Legion.
- George Henry Smith, British Vice-Consul, Bangkok.
- James Bain Smith, Principal Meteorological Officer, Group 9, Federal Government Service, Nigeria.
- Elsie May Squires, Her Majesty's Vice-Consul, Panama City.
- Thomas John Harvey Stanley, Supervisory Engineer, Broadcasting Division, Ministry of Culture, Singapore.
- William Arthur Steeples, Principal Grade III, Northern Nigeria Government Craft School.
- Jack Arthur Stretton, Telecommunications Planning Officer, Federal Government of Nigeria.
- Antoinette Swart, Principal, Nsamizi Training Centre, Uganda.
- Elsie Alice Symes, Head of Communications Department, United Kingdom Mission to the United Nations, New York.
- Maurice Pollock Thomas, MC, Her Majesty's Consul (Information), Munich.
- Edward Buckingham Passmore Towill, British subject resident in Brazil.
- Ethel Margaret Tsatsopoulos, Librarian, Information Department, Her Majesty's Embassy, Athens.
- William Turner, MB, ChB, Medical Officer in charge of Tawan, Sabah, Malaysia.
- Dorothy Mary Twidale, British subject resident in Brazil.
- Ernest Reginald Vaughan, lately Curator, Botany Department, University of Ghana, Ghana.
- Peter Swann Wallis, Chief Water Supply Superintendent, Eastern Nigeria.
- The Reverend Canon Alfred James Ward, British subject resident in Denmark.
- Cuthbert Frank Waters, Senior Electrical Engineer, Western Nigeria.
- Margaret Aileen Williams, MRCS, LRCP, a Medical Missionary in Uganda.
- Eric Noel Wilton, Administrative Officer Class II, Northern Nigeria.
- Eric Francis Woods, lately Her Majesty's Vice-Consul, Hanoi.

Australian States

- Florence Henrietta Blundell. For services to the community, especially as a member of the Royal Prince Alfred Hospital Auxiliary, State of New South Wales.
- John Stuart Gardiner. For political services in the State of New South Wales.
- Edith Myra Hurman, MB, ChM. For services to medicine in the State of New South Wales.
- Gordon Emery Kirkby. For services to primary industry in the State of New South Wales.
- Walter Richard Lawrence. For public and social welfare services in the State of New South Wales.
- Jessie Madeline Sheldon. For services to the community in the State of New South Wales.
- Herbert Reuben Thorncraft. For services to local government and the community in the State of New South Wales.
- John Edward Thornett. For services to Rugby Union football in the State of New South Wales.
- Winifred Harriett Tier, Matron, Neringah Home of Peace, Wahroonga, State of New South Wales.
- Councillor William Henry Dumaresq, of Lindenow, State of Victoria. For services to local government and the community.
- Norman Keith McLeod, Staff Bandmaster, Melbourne Salvation Army, State of Victoria.
- Dick Nankervis, MM, JP, of Beechworth, State of Victoria. For services to local government and the welfare of ex-servicemen.
- William Aitchison Shand, of Hawthorn, State of Victoria. For services to ex-servicemen and women and their dependants.
- Councillor Leslie Joseph Thomas Stevens, JP, of Castlemaine, State of Victoria. For services to local government and the community.
- Edna Josephine Vincent. For social welfare services, particularly as President of the Frankston Community Hospital Auxiliary, State of Victoria.
- Elizabeth Deans Wiltshire (Betty Paterson), of Melbourne, State of Victoria. For services to Art and the community.
- Honour Coralie Burcher. For services to the Girl Guides movement in the State of Queensland.
- Cecil William Henderson, of Brisbane, State of Queensland. For services to the encouragement of youth in sporting activities.
- John Keogh, of South Brisbane, State of Queensland. For services to local government and community affairs.
- Francis McCauley. For services in the fields of local government and agricultural development in the State of Queensland.
- Mary Frances McGrath, Matron, Proserpine District Hospital, Proserpine, State of Queensland.
- Marjorie Anne St. Henry. For services to local government and community welfare in the State of Queensland.
- The Reverend Clarence Samuel Trudgian, Superintendent, Brisbane City Mission, State of Queensland.
- Renatus Witford. For charitable and community services in the State of Western Australia.
- Louis James Coventry, Bandmaster, Latrobe Federal Band, State of Tasmania, for many years.
- John Roy Fidler, MC. For services to the community in the State of Tasmania.
- Ethel Maud Sturzaker, of Inveresk, State of Tasmania. For social welfare services.

Colonial Office

- Leopold Clifford Balderamos, Chief Commissioner of the Boy Scouts, British Honduras.
- Leotta Burke. For services to the community in Barbados.
- Quentina Ethel Chapman-Edwards. For services to nursing in British Guiana.
- Frances Lilian Charlton, Principal, Adi Cakobau School, Fiji.
- Chiu Lut-sau. For services to the community in Hong Kong.
- Meta Cumberbatch. For public services in the Bahamas.
- Donald Brian Doe, Director of Antiquities, Aden.
- Valerie Eliza Gwendoline Sarah Ruby Dyett, Personnel Officer, Administrators Office, Montserrat.
- Henry Norris Bullard Ferguson. For public services in the Bahamas.
- Nellie Green. For public services in Swaziland.
- The Reverend Fenwick Hall, Canon of St. Paul's Cathedral and Vicar of St. Matthew's Church, St. Helena.
- Li Chuen, General Clerical Service, Special Class, Hong Kong.
- Marion Magdalene Hayley MacAndrew, Administrative Assistant, Public Services Commission, British Guiana.
- Bakshi Singh Mal. For public services in Fiji.
- Joas Tseliso Mapetla. For public services in Basutoland.
- Hugh St. Clair McConnie, Superintendent of Agriculture, St. Vincent.
- Sister Mary McLoughlin, Nursing Sister, Victoria Hospital, Seychelles.
- Lucille Irene Mittelholzer. For social services in British Guiana.
- Lucy Hazel Money. For public services in the British Solomon Islands Protectorate.
- Muhammad Sa'id Naji, Deputy Permanent Secretary, Ministry of Interior, Federation of South Arabia.
- Shiu Nandan, Senior Field Officer, Department of Agriculture, Fiji.
- Stella Leonora Neckles. For public services in Grenada.
- Emile Philippe Benjamin Ohsan, lately Bandmaster of the Mauritius Police Band.
- William David Heber Percy, Assistant Adviser, Aden.
- John William Raymond Perkins. For public services in Montserrat.
- Ib Petersen, Senior Co-operative Officer Class I, Hong Kong.
- Katherine Slaney Poole, Information Officer, British Solomon Islands Protectorate.
- Randolph St. Clair Prout, Superintendent of Agricultural Machinery, St. Lucia.
- William Leslie Reid. For public services in New Hebrides.
- Albertina Sophia Saul. For public and social services in British Guiana.
- Louis Michel Philippe Savy, Auditor, Seychelles.
- Ragbeer Dial Singh. For public services in British Guiana.
- Arthur Stanley Smith. For services in the fields of teaching and Scouting in Barbados.
- Alethea Sprott. For services to the community in St. Christopher-Nevis-Anguilla.
- Cyril Thomas Stratton, Statistician, Hong Kong.
- Jenamo Jani Tebape, District Officer, Bechuanaland.
- Helen Hamilton Bellot Thibou, Administrative Secretary (Chief Personnel Officer), Antigua.
- Reuben Uatioa, Broadcasting Officer, Gilbert and Ellice Islands Colony.
- John Watt, Skipper, Fisheries Department, Aden.
- Caleb Albert Thomas Wells. For public services in Bermuda.
- Betty Kathleen Wilhelm, Personal Assistant, Swaziland Administration.
- George Winstanley, Assistant Secretary, Cabinet, Bechuanaland.

=== Order of the Companions of Honour (CH) ===
- Henry Graham Greene, Writer.
- The Right Honourable Edith Clara, Baroness Summerskill, Member of Parliament for West Fulham, 1938–1955, and for Warrington, 1955–1961. Parliamentary Secretary, Ministry of Food, 1945–1950; Minister of National Insurance, 1950–1951. Chairman of the Labour Party, 1954–1955. For political and public services.

=== Companion of the Imperial Service Order (ISO) ===
Home Civil Service

- Leonard Alfred Barber, Chief Executive Officer, Board of Customs and Excise.
- Reginald Orange Bearne, Principal Inspector of Taxes, Board of Inland Revenue.
- James Begbie, Deputy Regional Controller, Eastern Region, National Assistance Board.
- Stanley Ernest Clarke, Chief Executive Officer, Ministry of Power.
- Dorothy Annie Denny, OBE, lately Grade 4A, HM Diplomatic Service.
- William Roy Froom, Chief Executive Officer, Ministry of Transport.
- Alec Henry Glass, Senior Chief Executive Officer, Ministry of Aviation.
- Henry Joseph Hobart, Senior Engineer and Ship Surveyor, Marine Survey, Greenock, Board of Trade.
- Denis William Howell, Grade 2 Officer, Ministry of Labour.
- Frank Norman Howes, Principal Scientific Officer, Ministry of Agriculture, Fisheries and Food.
- Alfred Leach, Senior Chief Executive Officer, Ministry of Defence (Army).
- Ira Donovan Lorde, Assistant Controller of Death Duties, Board of Inland Revenue.
- Edward Harry Roy Lubbock, lately Assistant. Director of Contracts (Naval), Ministry of Defence (Royal Navy).
- Alfred John Merritt, Principal Regional Officer, Ministry of Health.
- Albert Edward John Pettet, lately Assistant Director, Water Pollution Research Laboratory, Ministry of Technology.
- Herbert Holgate Pollard, Senior Assistant District Auditor, Ministry of Housing and Local Government.
- Magnus William Ramsay, Telephone Manager, Glasgow, General Post Office.
- George Henry Roberts, Principal, Home Office.
- William Alfred Rowe, Principal Examiner, Board of Trade.
- George Henry Shepherd, Assistant Chief Architect, Ministry of Public Building and Works.
- James Clark Walker, Chief Executive Officer, Department of Agriculture and Fisheries for Scotland.
- Joseph Alfred Worrall, Senior Chief Executive Officer, Ministry of Pensions and National Insurance.
- William Thomas Wyborn, Chief Executive Officer, Ministry of Defence (Royal Air Force).

=== British Empire Medal (BEM) ===
Military Division

Royal Navy

- Sick Berth Chief Petty Officer Roland Baldock, P/M 929204.
- Chief Petty Officer Writer Denis Eddy Bartlett, D/MX 60912.
- Acting Chief Electrical Artificer Robert George Frederick Bloor, P/MX 818536.
- Colour Sergeant Robert William Neville Blunden, PO/X 6135, Royal Marines.
- Chief Air Fitter (A/E) Noel William Bracey, L/FX 841892.
- Master-at-Arms Bernard Thomas John Bray, D/MX 704582.
- Chief Engine Room Artificer Harold William Brewer, D/MX 778200.
- Chief Mechanician Bernard Albert Burgess, P/KX 868147.
- Sick Berth Chief Petty Officer (L) Christopher William Clements, D/MX 57577.
- Chief Petty Officer (GI) Terence Laughton Coles, P/JX 703154.
- Regimental Sergeant Major Henry Edward Day CH/X 3090, Royal Marines.
- Chief Petty Officer Thomas James Dewane, P/JX 157622.
- Chief Radio Electrician Francis David Dillon, P/MX 759335.
- Master-at-Arms John William Field, P/MX 748969.
- Chief Radio Supervisor Victor George Fisher, P/JX 163749.
- Chief Wren Cook (S) Rose Ann Gallagher, 20013 Women's Royal Naval Service.
- Chief Petty Officer Sidney George Goddard, P/JX 745746.
- Quartermaster Sergeant Leonard William Holmes, PO/X 6527, Royal Marines.
- Chief Petty Officer (UCI) John Stanley Howe, P/JX 660442.
- Chief Radio Supervisor Jack Karsten, W999386 Royal Naval Reserve.
- Chief Mechanician Walter Charles Clement Kendrick, P/KX 142242.
- Chief Petty Officer (GAI) Francis Henry McLaughlin, DSM, P/JX 146012.
- Petty Officer Steward Emmanuel Pellegrini, P/L 944542.
- Chief Aircraft Artificer Victor Phillips, L/FX 75066.
- Chief Aircraft Artificer Ramon Oliver Philip Powell, L/FX 669092.
- Chief Electrical Artificer Arthur Noel Rolls, P/MX 102294.
- Chief Engineering Mechanic Daniel Gardiner Rush, P/KX 580872.
- Petty Officer Alick Douglas Scott, P/JX 292641.
- Chief Communication Yeoman Harvey John Stockwell, P/JX 646425 (formerly on loan to the Royal Malaysian Navy).
- Engine Room Artificer (1st Class) George Thomas Sutton, P/MX 944526 (formerly serving with the British Joint Services Training Team, Ghana).
- Chief Aircraft Artificer (A/E) Donald George Wilson White, L/FX 669625.

Army

- 14473925 Warrant Officer Class II (acting) William George Beeching, Army Catering Corps.
- 14374043 Warrant Officer Class II (acting) Neville Frank Brooks, Army Catering Corps.
- 22970131 Sergeant John Joseph Buffine, The Lancashire Fusiliers.
- 23208166 Staff-Sergeant Leslie Harold Cole, The Buffs (Royal East Kent Regiment), Territorial Army.
- 22547427 Staff-Sergeant (local) Thomas Harold Cross, Royal Corps of Signals.
- 23478668 Sergeant Albert Crossland, The King's Own Yorkshire Light Infantry, Territorial Army.
- 23234484 Corporal Geoffrey Michael Du-Vor Dudley, Corps of Royal Electrical and Mechanical Engineers.
- 22554001 Warrant Officer Class II (acting) Henry Derek Dunn, Intelligence Corps.
- 22815101 Staff-Sergeant Alfred Charles Ford, The Duke of Edinburgh's Royal Regiment (Berkshire and Wiltshire).
- 23185208 Staff-Sergeant John Gardiner, Army Physical Training Corps.
- 22558738 Arthur Herbert Grace, Royal Army Ordnance Corps, Territorial Army.
- 225124496 Staff-Sergeant Francis Greenfield, Royal Army Medical Corps, Territorial Army.
- 2208398 Sergeant (acting) Thomas Hughes, Royal Regiment of Artillery, Territorial Army.
- 22544091 Sergeant Alfred William Iddison, Royal Armoured Corps, Territorial Army.
- 23507242 Sergeant (acting) William John Locker, Royal Corps of Signals.
- 22263325 Warrant Officer Class II (acting) James Scott Lyall, Royal Corps of Transport.
- W/45694 Warrant Officer Class II (acting) Florence Middleton, Women's Royal Army Corps.
- 21038476 Sergeant Godfrey Thomas Morgan, 1st Green Jackets (43rd and 52nd).
- 23675227 Corporal Louis Lloyd Rex, Corps of Royal Engineers.
- 22384248 Sergeant Edward Roberts, The Cheshire Regiment.
- 23533778 Sergeant John Arthur Roberts, Corps of Royal Electrical and Mechanical Engineers.
- 22824492 Sergeant (acting) Samuel Saunderson, Corps of Royal Electrical and Mechanical Engineers.
- T/22823333 Sergeant Colin Frederick Skinner, Royal Corps of Transport.
- 22379663 Staff-Sergeant Herbert Wade Stephenson, Royal Corps of Transport.
- 22440565 Staff-Sergeant (acting) Ronald James Steppe, Corps of Royal Electrical and Mechanical Engineers.
- 22541043 Staff-Sergeant David William Thomas, Corps of Royal Engineers.
- 2873889 Staff-Sergeant (local) Dugald John Thow, The Gordon Highlanders.
- 22557949 Warrant Officer Class I (local) Frederick George Richard Tibble, 1st Green Jackets (43rd and 52nd).
- 863432 Warrant Officer Class II (formerly Sergeant) Norman Henry Trotman, Royal Regiment of Artillery.
- 22395636 Staff-Sergeant Geoffrey Ernest Charles Turner, Army Physical Training Corps.
- 22573866 Sergeant Bernard Ronald Weeks, Army Catering Corps.
- 21004937 Staff-Sergeant William James Wilkinson, Corps of Royal Engineers, Territorial Army.
- 23230536 Sergeant Geoffrey Williamson, The York and Lancaster Regiment.
- 22559234 Warrant Officer Class II (acting) John Winters, The Durham Light Infantry, permanently attached to 22 Special Air Service Regiment.

Overseas Awards

- Warrant Officer Class II Eric Winston Cadogan, The Barbados Regiment.
- Sergeant Julio Pons, The Gibraltar Regiment.

Royal Air Force

- U0553861 Flight Sergeant Denis Baker.
- V0576068 Flight Sergeant Donald Ian Douglas.
- B2286686 Flight Sergeant Charles Allen Evans.
- H0455466 Flight Sergeant Gladys Mary Huzzey, Women's Royal Air Force.
- Rl835982 Flight Sergeant John Herbert Byron Jenkins, Royal Air Force Regiment.
- J0543232 Flight Sergeant William George Lawson.
- N0700981 Flight Sergeant Raymond Albert Joseph Levy.
- G0567691 Flight Sergeant John Patrick Mclaughlin.
- E4032561 Flight Sergeant William Richard John Mock.
- N0592267 Flight Sergeant Ronald William Morley.
- W0537461 Flight Sergeant John Ralph Aloysius Morrison.
- F0592162 Flight Sergeant (Acting Warrant Officer) Malcolm Keith Smith.
- S0573952 Flight Sergeant Derrick Gordon Livingstone Stanley.
- S4029790 Flight Sergeant Donald Treadwell, Royal Air Force Regiment.
- W4019386 Flight Sergeant Wilfred John Williams.
- G4017283 Chief Technician Ronald David Henry Bosdet.
- E1923264 Chief Technician Edwin James Brooks.
- M0584308 Chief Technician Ernie Cheetham.
- Y0633697 Chief Technician Ronald Fountain.
- Y4022597 Chief Technician Ronald Clement Sutton.
- S3009357 Chief Technician Robert Edwin Taylor.
- J0582696 Chief Technician John Herbert Wetherell.
- Y1585170 Acting Flight Sergeant Arthur William Charles Gough.
- J1928537 Sergeant Brian Gilders Day.
- X4035887 Sergeant Michael John Dulk.
- Q4122426 Sergeant Anthony Frank Jenkins.
- Q4007552 Sergeant Joseph Michael Jordan.
- L0533469 Sergeant John Patrick Mullen.
- X4043578 Sergeant Ronald Thomas Pole.
- R2772190 Sergeant Alan Rawson.
- N4130777 Sergeant Alexander Wallace.
- V4012382 Sergeant Sidney James Wyatt.
- N2486193 Acting Sergeant Desmond Brain Newman.
- U3120326 Corporal John Forrest.
- N0588804 Corporal John Rutherford.
- P4259888 Senior Aircraftman Christopher James John Clark.

Civil Division

United Kingdom

- George Ernest Abbott, Driver, Brighton, Hove & District Omnibus Co. Ltd., Transport Holding Company.
- William John Ackland, Sergeant, Admiralty Constabulary, Ministry of Defence (Royal Navy).
- Charles Adams, Resident Caretaker and Gardener, Air Forces Memorial, Runnymede.
- Hussein Gambi Ahmed, Mess Steward Grade I, RAF Steamer Point, Ministry of Defence (Royal Air Force).
- James William Allen, District Gasfitting Foreman, Northampton, East Midlands Gas Board.
- John Henry Allwood. For services to the Saxondale Hospital, Nottingham.
- Walter John Arnold, lately General Foreman, H. C. Clarke & Sons Lief., Coventry.
- Robert Charles Ashford, Divisional Road Foreman, Dorset County Council.
- Samuel Bailey, Leading Hand, Pontefract Factory of Remploy Ltd.
- Enid Balcombe, Assistant Group Officer, Caernarvonshire Fire Brigade.
- Ernest Alan Bale, Radio Supervisor, Government Communications Headquarters.
- Osyth Ballantine, Honorary Collector, Street Savings Group, Walton-on-the-Naze.
- William Charles Barber, Factory Superintendent (Assembly), Foxboro-Yoxall Ltd.
- Thomas James Barr, Sergeant, Royal Ulster Constabulary.
- Arthur Leonard Baxter, Traffic Superintendent, No. 14 Maintenance Unit, RAF Carlisle, Ministry of Defence (Royal Air Force).
- John Bembridge, Toolmaker, High Duty Alloys Ltd.
- Robert Bird, Assistant Technical Superintendent, No. 5 Maintenance Unit, RAF Kemble, Ministry of Defence (Royal Air Force).
- George Henry Anthony Boyle, Water Bailiff, Bala Lake, Merioneth.
- Leo Brennan, Inspector, Telephone House, Manchester, General Post Office.
- Reginald Brightmore, Driver, Chesterfield Corporation Transport Department.
- Reginald Walter Broom, Staff Officer (Operations), Civil Defence Corps, Dorset.
- Harry Brown, Divisional Commandant, West Riding Special Constabulary.
- Gwendoline Mabel Buck, Drawing Office Assistant, Ministry of Public Building and Works.
- Cicely Vera Burch, Centre Organiser, Bexhill, Women's Voluntary Service.
- William Thomas Burniston, lately Sergeant, Civil Aviation Constabulary, Edinburgh (Turnhouse) Airport.
- Clifford John Capel, Foreman Linesman (Grade 1), Yarnton Depot, Southern Electricity Board.
- Ethel Capey, Chief Supervisor, Trinity Telephone Exchange, Stoke-on-Trent, General Post Office.
- Alexander Carmichael, Station Officer, Fife Fire Brigade.
- Harry Church, Foreman of Trades (M. & E.), Ministry of Public Building and Works.
- Thomas Edward Cochrane, Sub-Officer, Auxiliary Fire Service, Staffordshire.
- Walter Collins, Chargehand, Purfleet Terminal, Esso Petroleum Company, Ltd.
- John Henry Crewe, Foreman—Mains, Grade 1, North Lakeland District (Penrith), North Western Electricity Board.
- Michael John Croskery, Storeman, Northern Ireland Command, Ministry of Defence (Army).
- Thomas Edwin Crump, Chief Inspector (Postal) Head Post Office, Wolverhampton.
- Dorothy Isabel Cunneber, Honorary Street Savings Group Collector, Mangotsfield, Bristol.
- Edward Cunningham, Enrolled Nurse, Hartwood Hospital, Shotts, Lanarkshire.
- Terence Frederick Cusack, Examiner, No. 7 Maintenance Unit, RAF Quedgeley, Ministry of Defence (Royal Air Force).
- John Davies, Excavator Driver, Ministry of Agriculture, Fisheries and Food.
- Jack Townsend Davis, Postman Higher Grade, Head Post Office, Dartford, Kent.
- John Hamilton Dawson, Auxiliary Coastguardsman, Newbiggin Life Saving Company, Board of Trade.
- Robert Stanley Dewey, Industrial Labourer, Barton Stacey Estate, Ministry of Defence (Army).
- Sidney Wallace Dillon, Mains Foreman, Mansfield District, East Midlands Electricity Board.
- Henry F. Dossett, Senior Theatre Orderly, St. Bartholomew's Hospital, London.
- Arthur Walter Duck, Chargeman of Skilled Labourers, HMS Dolphin, Ministry of Defence (Royal Navy).
- Kenneth Percival John Dunford, Chief Demonstrator, Lansing Bagnall Ltd. For services to exports.
- Thomas Edward Dunne, Quarter Master/Able Seaman, MV Port Nicholson, Port Line Ltd.
- Cecily Claydon Dyer, Honorary Collector, Street Savings Group, Southampton.
- Kenneth Cecil Robert Dyer, Sergeant, Hampshire and Isle of Wight Constabulary.
- Arthur George Edgecombe, Chargeman, Royal Naval College, Dartmouth, Ministry of Defence (Royal Navy).
- Doris Bowen Evans, Cadet Officer, Merionethshire Branch, British Red Cross Society.
- Winifred Farmer, Foster-Mother, East Sussex County Council.
- George Fawcett, Postman, Head Post Office, Eastbourne.
- Ann Fitchett, Honorary Savings Group Collector, Sutton-in-Ashfield, Nottinghamshire.
- John Forsyth, Dock Foreman, Grangemouth Docks, British Transport Docks Board.
- William James Foster, lately Head Messenger, Offices of the Cabinet, Northern Ireland.
- David Frame, Civil Defence Rescue Instructor, Eastbourne County Borough.
- William George Fry, lately Housemaster and Assistant Band Instructor, Duke of York's Royal Military School, Ministry of Defence (Army).
- Charles Garforth, Instructor and Member, Warden Section, Civil Defence Corps, East Riding of Yorkshire.
- Andrew Garriock, Pumpman, Esso Pembrokeshire, Esso Petroleum Co. Ltd.
- Allan Mitchell Gibbs, Station Officer, Dorset Fire Brigade.
- Kenneth John Godbeer, Driver, Ministry of Public Building and Works.
- John Charles Goodrum, Radio Officer, Thames Navigation Service, Port of London Authority.
- Stanley William Graves, Senior Precision Optical Worker, Hilger & Watts Ltd. For services to exports.
- Edward Ralph Green, Works Technical Grounds Maintenance, Grade III, Ministry of Public Building and Works.
- William Frederick Green, Skilled Craftsman/Chargehand, Harwell, United Kingdom Atomic Energy Authority.
- Monica Avice Greening, Head Stewardess, SS Windsor Castle, British & Commonwealth Shipping Co. Ltd.
- Thomas Robert Greeno, Works Overseer, Grade III, HM Stationery Office.
- Michael Walter James Griggs, Senior Mechanical Methods and General Engineer, Radio & Allied Industries Ltd.
- Arthur Blakey Hallam, Joint Surgical Instrument Foreman, Chas. F. Thackray Ltd., Leeds.
- Tuan Mohamed Buhara Hamin, Staff Officer, Imperial Lighthouse Service, Ceylon, Board of Trade.
- Walter John Harbon, Senior Leading Fireman, Royal Radar Establishment, Ministry of Aviation.
- Robert William Harrison, Foreman Turbine Operator, Spondon Power Station, East Midlands Division, Midlands Region, Central Electricity Generating Board.
- Edith Mary Hawkes, Organiser, W.V.S. Club House and Shop, St Francis Hospital, Haywards Heath, Sussex.
- Thomas Hingley, Shackle Smith, Thos. B. Wellings & Co. Ltd.
- James Holland, Oncost Worker, Cumnock, National Coal Board.
- Wyndham Arthur James Horne, Resident Plumber, HM Dockyard, Chatham, Ministry of Public Building and Works.
- Edwin Horsfield, Leading Inspector Associated Electrical Industries, Sheffield.
- Elsie Howcroft, Centre Organiser, Saddleworth, Women's Voluntary Service.
- Neil Hughes, Baggage Master, SS Andes, Royal Mail Lines Ltd.
- Thomas Hunt, Development Worker, Coppice No. 1 Colliery, National Coal Board.
- Gladys Lucy Hutchby, Honorary Collector, Street Savings Group, Warwick.
- William Charles Hutchins, Research and Development Craftsman, Safety in Mines Research Establishment, Ministry of Power.
- Wilfred Hastings Ingham, Technical Grade III, Royal Armament Research and Development Establishment, Ministry of Defence (Army).
- Annie Carrick Irving, Honorary Collector, Street Savings Group, Haltwhistle, Northumberland.
- Thomas R. Jackson, Senior Foreman, J. Stone & Co. (Deptford) Ltd.
- James Norman James, Supplies Supervisor, Haunchwood Colliery, National Coal Board.
- John Lewis James, Chief Inspector (Technical), Mechanical and Electrical Engineering Department, Paddington, British Railways Board.
- Iris May Elizabeth John, Honorary Collector, Street Savings Group, Swansea.
- Madeleine Johnson, Supervisor, Telephone Exchange, Cirencester, General Host Office.
- Francis David Jones, Salvageman, Tower Colliery, National Coal Board.
- Ethel Mary Elizabeth Kelly, Chargehand, Painton & Company Ltd., Northampton.
- Thomas Knill, Chargehand Joiner, Ministry of Public Building and Works.
- Mary Hannah Knowles, Postwoman, Eskdale Sub-Office, Holmrook, Cumberland.
- Frank Lane, Signalman, London Transport Board.
- Joseph Latter, Senior Chief Supervisor, Telephone Exchange, Brighton, General Post Office.
- Edwin John Laver, Head Groundsman, Yeovilton, Ministry of Defence (Royal Navy).
- Ellen Sylvester Leftwich, Sub-Office Assistant, Hendon Station Road, General Post Office.
- Thomas John Lloyd, Training Officer, Avon Colliery, National Coal Board.
- Peter Lofthouse, Assistant Manager, Machine Shop, Daniel Doncaster & Sons Ltd.
- Angus MacArthur, Sub-Postmaster, Cromore Scale Payment S.O., Isle of Lewis.
- Margaret McCallum, Honorary Collector Street Sayings Group, Inverary, Argyll.
- Robert McCarthy, Chargehand Craftsman, Royal Ordnance Factory, Burghfield, Ministry of Aviation.
- Wilhelmina A. McClure, Honorary Collector, Street Savings Group, Belfast.
- Donald McCulloch, Chief Inspector, City of Glasgow Police.
- John Alfred Macken, Foreman Instrument Maker, Science Research Council, Department of Education and Science.
- George Maclean, Caretaker/Handyman, Margaret Carnegie and Elgin Hostels, Portree, Skye.
- John William Mallaburn, Deputy Superintendent, Royal Courts of Justice.
- Matthew Malloch, Stoker, Leverndale Hospital, Glasgow.
- Archibald Petticrew Mannus, Chief Inspector, Head Post Office, Belfast.
- Thomas Martin, Mechanical Maintenance Foreman, Clyde's Mill Generating Station.
- Joseph Moat, Sheet Metal Worker, Vickers Ltd., Shipbuilding Group, Newcastle upon Tyne.
- George David Mordecai, Electricar Driver, Ford Motor Company Ltd., Dagenham.
- James Alfred Morphy, Inspector, Metropolitan Police Force.
- Eric Aylmore Morrall, Process & General Supervisory Grade II, Military Engineering Experimental Establishment, Ministry of Defence (Army).
- George Herbert Morris, Shop Foreman, Slade Green, British Railways Board.
- Samuel Murray, Underground Datal Worker, Hauxley Colliery, National Coal Board.
- Philip Sabin Nutting, Foreman, Machine Shop, Hawker Siddeley Dynamics, Coventry.
- Bishop Frederick Offen, Senior Instrument Maker, Royal Observatory, C.P. South Africa, Department of Education and Science.
- Robert Johnston Oliver, Chief Observer, Post 23/M.4, Royal Observer Corps.
- Kenneth Frederick Paradine, Foreman, Hale, Hamilton (Valves) Ltd., Uxbridge.
- Albert Parker, Overman, Maltby Colliery, National Coal Board.
- Horace Parks, Column Rescue Officer, Civil Defence Corps, Gloucestershire.
- Alexander Cowan Patrick, Inspector, Bears den Telephone Exchange, Glasgow, General Post Office.
- Alfred Edward Pattenden, Technical Officer, HM Diplomatic Service.
- Frederick Peckett, Chief Officer Class I, HM Prison Dartmoor.
- Howard James Perry, Sergeant, Metropolitan Police Force.
- Allan Gordon Philip, Station Warden, RAF Bovingdon, Ministry of Defence (Royal Air Force).
- Eva Gertrude Phillips, Head Tracer, A.S.W.E., Ministry of Defence (Royal Navy).
- Godfrey William Phillips, Principal Keeper, Lowestoft Lighthouse.
- Leonard Frank Ashton Pimlott, Workshop Superintendent, R.E.M.E. Workshops, Colchester, Ministry of Defence (Army).
- John William Price, Land Service Assistant Grade II, Ministry of Agriculture, Fisheries and Food.
- Evan Harry Rawlinson, Engineer-in-Charge of Mechanical Development, Hawker Siddeley Dynamics Ltd., Hatfield.
- George William Harold Rawlinson, lately Hospital Chief Officer Class I, HM Prison Wormwood Scrubs.
- Thomas Gwyn Richards, Sub-Postmaster, Gabalfa T.S.O., Cardiff.
- John William Richmond, Postal and Telegraph Officer, Head Post Office, West Hartlepool, Co. Durham.
- Thomas Richmond, Plumber, SS Canberra, P. & O. Steam Navigation Co.
- Ernest Rickwood, Technician, Class I, Cable Depot, General Post Office.
- Lilian Roberts, Senior Enrolled Nurse, Park Hospital, Wellingborough.
- Clifford Sidney Rosewarne, Commandant, Somerset/23 Detachment, Somerset Branch, British Red Cross Society.
- William Sylvester Saunders, Sergeant-Major Instructor, Combined Cadet Force, Hurstpierpoint College.
- Frederick Walter Sealey, Collector of Fishery Statistics, Teignmouth, Devon.
- Harold Skelly, Warrant Officer, No. 60 (Teignmouth) Squadron, Air Training Corps.
- Edmund Joshua James Smith, Established Painter, Ministry of Defence (Royal Navy).
- Fred Smith, Engineer Mechanic II, Board of Customs and Excise.
- George William Smith, Experimental Worker I, Royal Armament Research & Development Establishment, Ministry of Defence (Army).
- Jack Lingard Smith, Highways Foreman, Special Grade, Lindsey County Council.
- Richard Smith, Warrant Officer, No. 196 (Walsall) Squadron, Air Training Corps.
- Waiter Robert Smith, Head Foreman Fitter, Harland & Wolff Ltd., Belfast.
- Edward George Sole, Foreman, North Thames Division, South Eastern Region, Central Electricity Generating Board.
- Arthur Stanton, Driver, HM Diplomatic Service.
- Thomas Penman Stewart, Chief Casting Inspector, Cruickshank & Co. Ltd., Denny.
- Robert Storey, District Motive Power Inspector, Class I, British Railways Board.
- Joseph Grant Lindsay Stratton, Able Seaman, SS Spray, General Service Contracts.
- William Sutherland, Sergeant-Major Instructor, Banffshire Army Cadet Force.
- Thomas Thomas, Supervisory Foreman, Roads and Bridges Department, Carmarthenshire County Council.
- Frederick Arthur Thompson, Senior Staff Officer, Lowestoft Area, Civil Defence Corps, East Suffolk.
- Francis Henry Thurgood, lately Chief Office Keeper, Grade I, Ministry of Defence (Army).
- Frederick William Townsend, District Governor Maintenance Attendant, Bristol, South Western Gas Board.
- Gladys Walsh, Member, Furniture Department, Women's Voluntary Service.
- Alfred George Welling, Leading Technical Officer, North Area, Telephone Manager's Office, General Post Office.
- William George Wellstead, Head Attendant, Tate Gallery.
- Wilfred Henry Wherrell, Technical Class Grade II, Royal Aircraft Establishment, Ministry of Aviation.
- Edwin Joseph Doodey Wilkinson, Forester, Forestry Commission.
- Sidney Williams, Controller of Telephonists, Llanelly Steel Co. Ltd.
- Albert Edward Wilson, Senior Machine Shop Foreman, R. W. Crabtree & Sons Ltd., Gateshead. For services to exports.
- Alexander Wilson, Sub-District Commandant, Ulster Special Constabulary.
- Frank Conway Wilson, Assistant Foreman Plumber, Cammell Laird & Co. (Shipbuilders & Engineers) Ltd., Birkenhead.
- Alfred Ernest Wood, Chargeman, Victor Products (Wallsend) Ltd. For services to exports.
- Frederick Charles Wood, Station Officer, Leicestershire and Rutland Fire Brigade.
- Herbert Wood, First Class Gas Fitter/Driver, Central Lancashire Group, North Western Gas Board.
- William Henry Wood, House Foreman, British Broadcasting Corporation.
- Jack Aubrey Worboys, Motor Vehicle Fitter, Office of the Receiver for the Metropolitan Police District.
- Ernest Wright, Chargehand Carpenter, British Railways Board.
- Richard Wright, Foreman Boatbuilder, R. Newton & Sons Ltd., Fleetwood.
- Walter Yetman, Chief Officer Class I, HM Prison Durham.
- William Edward Victor Young, Curator, Avebury Museum, Ministry of Public Building and Works.

State of Western Australia

- Elizabeth Cunningham, JP. For community and welfare work.
- Angus Roy Peterkin, Manager, Swan Boys' and Girls' Orphanage (now known as Swanleigh).
- Lorna May Mitchell. For dedicated work in the teaching and care of slow learning children.
- Catherine Pauline Riley. For welfare work at the Royal Perth Hospital.

Tanzania

- Violet Edith May Rumbol, formerly Matron, Ocean Road Maternity Hospital, Dar es Salaam.

Overseas Territories

- Clyde Elphiston Knight, Assistant Head Male Nurse, Mental Hospital, Barbados.
- Rena Frances Smith, Public Health Nurse, Bermuda.
- John Gregory Hunte, Sergeant of Police, British Guiana.
- Sydney St. Clair Farara, Supervisor of Electricity, British Virgin Islands.
- Sivirosi Tora, Head Coxswain, Marine Section, Royal New Zealand Air Force Detachment, Laucala Bay, Fiji.
- Albert Louis Vallejo, Chargeman Electrician, Lands and Works Department, Gibraltar.
- Lo Siu-Ki, Staff Sergeant Class I, Hong Kong Police Force.
- Lily Cheng Yuk-lin, Liaison Officer, Class III, Secretariat for Chinese Affairs, Hong Kong.
- Olga Mildred Patterson, Teacher, Anglican Primary School, St. Lucia.
- Algenor Morel, Coxswain, Ferry Boat, Seychelles.
- Te Bereti Naou, Magistrate, Tamana Island, Gilbert and Ellice Islands Colony, Western Pacific.

=== Queen's Police Medal (QPM) ===
England and Wales

- John Maxwell Hill, DFC, Her Majesty's Inspector of Constabulary (lately Commander, Metropolitan Police).
- Frank Stanley Gale, Chief Constable, Newcastle upon Tyne City Police.
- Eric Arthur Abbott, Chief Constable, Worcester City Police.
- Thomas Christopher Williams, Chief Constable, West Sussex Constabulary.
- Arthur Hambleton, MC, Chief Constable, Dorset Constabulary.
- Frank Green, MBE, Assistant Chief Constable, Kingston-upon-Hull City Police.
- James Jenner, Assistant Chief Constable, Kent Constabulary.
- James Ball, MBE, Chief Superintendent, Deputy Chief Constable, St. Helens Borough Police.
- Hugh William Stevenson, Chief Superintendent, Metropolitan Police.
- Bertram Reginald Platt, Chief Superintendent, City of London Police.
- Joseph William Davis, Superintendent, Mid-Anglia Constabulary.
- Ian Forbes, Detective Superintendent, Metropolitan Police.

Scotland

- James Kidd McLellan, Chief Constable, Motherwell and Wishaw Burgh Police.
- William Irwin Davis, Chief Superintendent, City of Glasgow Police.

Northern Ireland

- William McGrotty Oliver, Head Constable, Royal Ulster Constabulary.

Australian States

- Norwin William Bauer, Chief Inspector, Queensland Police Force.
- Herman Friedrich Reinke, Inspector, Queensland Police Force.
- Samuel Henry Cooke, Inspector, Queensland Police Force.
- Thomas Patrick Donovan, Inspector, Queensland Police Force.
- Vincent Leslie Augustus Crank, Inspector, Queensland Police Force.
- Horace Keith Sparrow, Inspector, 1st Class, South Australia Police Force.
- William Terence Blytho, Inspector, 1st Class, South Australia Police Force.

Brunei

- Pengiran Jaya bin Pengiran Haji Rajid, Deputy Commissioner, Brunei Police Force.

Overseas Territories

- Sydney Aloysius Anderson, Chief of Police, St. Vincent.
- Thomas Edwin Clunie, Senior Assistant Commissioner of Police, Hong Kong.
- George Bernard McCaffery, Commissioner of Police, Mauritius.

=== Queen's Fire Services Medal (QFSM) ===
England and Wales

- Stanley Lambert, Assistant Chief Officer (Deputy Chief Fire Officer), Sheffield Fire Brigade.
- Hugh Lloyd Abbitt, Divisional Officer, Grade I, London Fire Brigade.
- Rowland Noble, Chief Fire Officer, Newcastle and Gateshead Joint Fire Service.
- Albert Edward Leighton, Divisional Officer, Grade I, London Fire Brigade.
- Stanley Wilfred Sheat, Chief Fire Service Officer, Ministry of Aviation Fire Service.

State of South Australia

- Thomas John Meaney, Chief Officer, South Australia Fire Brigade.
- Harry Robinson, Fireman, South Australia Fire Brigade.

=== Colonial Police Medal (CPM) ===
Brunei

- Pengiran Haji Abbas bin Pengiran Alliuddin, Chief Inspector, Brunei Police Force.
- George Edwin Coster, Assistant Commissioner, Brunei Police Force.

Overseas Territories

- James Thomas Bailey, Inspector, St. Christopher-Nevis-Anguilla Police Force.
- Leslie Benjamin Charles Baker, Superintendent, Hong Kong Police Force.
- Govuka Bhembe, No. 116, Sub-Inspector, Swaziland Police Force.
- John Webber Browett, Acting Chief Superintendent, Hong Kong Police Force.
- Eric Randolph Bryan, Inspector, British Guiana Police Force.
- Frank Indge-Buckingham, Chief Inspector, Hong Kong Police Force.
- Dennis Bush, Superintendent, Basutoland Police Force.
- John Martin Cafferkey, Sergeant, Bermuda Police Force.
- Chan Lam-cheong, Staff Sergeant Class II, Hong Kong Police Force.
- Chu Hok-shing, Senior Inspector, Hong Kong Police Force.
- Rogert Gabriel De Freitas, Superintendent, Special Constabulary, British Guiana Police Force.
- Gaston Fayd'Herbe De Maudave, Sergeant, Mauritius Police Force.
- Carlton Emanuel Duncan, Sergeant, British Guiana Police Force.
- Kenneth William Farmer, Superintendent, Hong Kong Police Force.
- William Robert Gallaway, Inspector, Fire Brigade Department, St. Christopher-Nevis-Anguilla Police Force.
- Claude Allan Haynes, Superintendent, British Guiana Police Force.
- Ko Fook-chuen, Superintendent, Hong Kong Auxiliary Police Force.
- Li Pi-lu, Staff Sergeant Class II, Hong Kong Police Force.
- Cyril Gordon March, Superintendent, Hong Kong Police Force.
- Kenneth Richard Jones Morris, Sergeant, Bermuda Police Force.
- Christine Jean Muspratt, Woman Constable, Bermuda Police Force.
- Pius Charles Prospere, Instructor (Station Sergeant) Regional Police Training Centre, Barbados, on secondment from the St. Lucia Police Force.
- Gilmore Charles Ruthborne Simons, Constable, Bermuda Police Force.
- Albert Henry Summerfield, Superintendent, Gibraltar Police Force.
- Frederick James Wakeford, DSM, Senior Fire Officer Class II, Fire Services, Hong Kong.
- Wong Kai, Sergeant, Hong Kong Police Force.
- Wu Kwei-wen, Fire Officer Class I (Fire Boats), Fire Services, Hong Kong.

=== Royal Red Cross (RRC) ===
Royal Navy

- Mary Stella Fetherston-Dilke, ARRC, Principal Matron, Queen Alexandra's Royal Naval Nursing Service.

Army

- Lieutenant-Colonel Gweneth Elizabeth Jones, ARRC (206250), Queen Alexandra's Royal Army Nursing Corps.
- Lieutenant-Colonel Honor Moira Carroll, ARRC (206078), Queen Alexandra's Royal Army Nursing Corps.

Royal Air Force

- Wing Officer Mary Taylor Russell, ARRC (405377), Princess Mary's Royal Air Force Nursing Service.

==== Associate of the Royal Red Cross (ARRC) ====
Royal Navy

- Margaret Amelia Webb Paterson, Superintending Sister, Queen Alexandra's Royal Naval Nursing Service.

Army

- Major Ada Boad (353617), Queen Alexandra's Royal Army Nursing Corps.
- Major Jessie Godtschailk (375626), Queen Alexandra's Royal Army Nursing Corps.

Royal Air Force

- Flight Officer Joan Metcalfe (407433), Princess Mary's Royal Air Force Nursing Service.

=== Air Force Cross (AFC) ===
- Wing Commander John Innes Parker (162094).
- Squadron Leader Philip Hugh Champniss (607403).
- Squadron Leader Anthony John Clarke (1333344).
- Squadron Leader Gordon Howard Gilbert (3504882).
- Squadron Leader William Francis Page (2538877).
- Squadron Leader Gerald Keith Peasley (3509019).
- Squadron Leader John William Waterton (3126890).
- Flight Lieutenant Michael Meadows (4070113).
- Flight Lieutenant Peter John Perrott (4078083).

==== Bar to Air Force Cross ====
- Wing Commander Douglas Stuartson Bell, DFC, AFC, (132618).
- Flight Lieutenant Harry Stanley Bray, AFC (4160480).

=== Queen's Commendation for Valuable Service in the Air ===
Army

- Major Leslie Stanley Whittingham-Jones (324496), The Royal Welch Fusiliers, serving with Jamaica Air Wing.

Royal Air Force

- Acting Wing Commander John Gale, OBE (183020).
- Squadron Leader Brian Carroll (2532386).
- Squadron Leader Norman Chamberlain, AFC (607008).
- Squadron Leader John Keith Craven (3511580).
- Squadron Leader Robert Leslie Davis (3114357).
- Squadron Leader Victor Charles Keay (134690).
- Squadron Leader Alexander Roy King (2452217).
- Squadron Leader Ian Howard Panton (3110062).
- Squadron Leader Rodney John Arthur Woods (181184).
- Flight Lieutenant Kenneth Ernest Appleford, AFC (1608448).
- Flight Lieutenant Arthur Edwin Bance (1604798).
- Flight Lieutenant Richard John Barnes, DFC (66005).
- Flight Lieutenant Brian George Bultitude (2238033).
- Flight Lieutenant Alan Robert Carter (3522786).
- Flight Lieutenant Robert James Chase (3512368).
- Flight Lieutenant Adrian Arthur Christopher Clapham (1295280).
- Flight Lieutenant Peter Desmond (1921674).
- Flight Lieutenant John Austen Grant (4230124).
- Flight Lieutenant Alec Jackson (3044006).
- Flight Lieutenant Kenneth Newman (3138103).
- Flight Lieutenant Frank Alan Nicholls (163980).
- Flight Lieutenant Louis Donald Pope, DFC (52745).
- Flight Lieutenant Ernest Powell (2389578).
- Flight Lieutenant Frank Potter Russell (177117).
- Flight Lieutenant Eric Charles Sadler (4086660).
- Flight Lieutenant Thomas Henry Stone, (3116962).
- Flight Lieutenant Farquharson Urquhart (55872).
- Flight Lieutenant Arthur William Vine, AFM (1323588).
- Flight Lieutenant John Alfred Young (2503241).
- Master Navigator Peter Alfred Lobb (E0571081).
- Master Signaller Norman Birch (A1129534).
- Master Signaller John Buckley (S1003452).
- N3507231 Flight Sergeant Clifford John Regan.

United Kingdom

- Captain Leslie Edmund Alexander, Senior Base Comet Training Captain, British European Airways Corporation.
- James Leslie Barnes, Chief Test Pilot, Bristol Siddeley Engines Ltd., Filton, Bristol.
- Captain Philip Brentnall, Flight Training Manager, 707s (Flight Operations) British Overseas Airways Corporation.
- Donald McMillan Knight, Deputy Chief Test Pilot, British Aircraft Corporation Ltd., Preston.
- Captain Jack Nicholl, Flight Training Manager, VC 10s (Flight Operations) British Overseas Airways Corporation.

== Australia ==
=== Knight Bachelor ===
- Henry Bolton Basten, CMG, Vice-Chancellor, University of Adelaide.
- Otto Herzberg Frankel, Chief of the Division of Plant Industry, Commonwealth Scientific and Industrial Research Organisation.
- Major-General William Dudley Refshauge, CBE, MB, BS, Director-General of Health.
- Walter Scott, CMG, Chairman, Decimal Currency Board, and Australian Industrial Design Council.
- Keith Cameron Wilson, of Tusmore, South Australia. For public and social welfare services.

=== Order of the Bath ===
==== Companion of the Order of the Bath (CB) ====
Military Division

- Air Vice-Marshal Ian Dougald McLachlan, CBE, DFC, Royal Australian Air Force.

=== Order of Saint Michael and Saint George ===
==== Companion of the Order of St Michael and St George (CMG) ====
- Harry John Daly, MB, ChM, of Castlecrag, New South Wales. For services to medicine.
- John Robert Kerr, QC, President of the Law Council of Australia.
- Albert Ernest Monk, Permanent President of the Australian Council of Trade Unions.
- Ernest Keith Sinclair, OBE, DFC, of South Yarra, Victoria. For services to journalism.

=== Order of the British Empire ===
==== Dame Commander of the Order of the British Empire (DBE) ====
Civil Division

- Annie (Ann) Mills McEwen, of Toorak, Victoria. For public services.

==== Knight Commander of the Order of the British Empire (KBE) ====
Military Division

Royal Australian Navy

- Vice-Admiral Alan Wedel Ramsay McNicoll, CB, CBE, GM.

Civil Division

- Senator the Honourable Shane Dunne Paltridge, Minister for Defence, and Leader of the Government in the Senate, Commonwealth of Australia.

==== Commander of the Order of the British Empire (CBE) ====
Military Division

Australian Military Forces

- Major-General (temporary) Timothy Frederick Cape, DSO, MBE (381), Australian Staff Corps.
- Major-General Francis George Hassett, DSO, MVO, OBE (227), Australian Staff Corps.

Royal Australian Air Force

- Acting Air Vice-Marshal Lawrence Robert Trudinger, MB, BS.

Civil Division

- Edward Thomas Cain, Commissioner of Taxation, Canberra.
- Reginald Sylvester Leydin, OBE, Administrator of Nauru.
- His Excellency David Williamson McNicol, High Commissioner for the Commonwealth of Australia in Wellington.
- Arthur Leonard Nutt, OBE, lately Deputy Secretary, Department of Immigration, Canberra.
- Frank Pascoe, General Manager and Director, Ansett Australia/Australian National Airways.
- Wilfred Prest, Truby Williams Professor of Economics, University of Melbourne.
- Victor John William Skermer, OBE, Auditor-General.
- Herbert Philip Weymouth, OBE, of Killara, New South Wales. For services to the Australian shipbuilding industry.

==== Officer of the Order of the British Empire (OBE) ====
Military Division

Royal Australian Navy

- Commander George Angus Bennett.

Australian Military Forces

- Lieutenant-Colonel William John Bauert (287), Royal Australian Electrical and Mechanical Engineers.
- Colonel Malcolm Edward Just, ED (124932), Royal Australian Infantry.
- Lieutenant-Colonel Bruce Alexander McDonald (3392), Royal Australian Infantry.

Royal Australian Air Force

- Wing Commander William Simpson McAloney, AM (03600).
- Wing Commander Keith Manson Rundle, MBE (033047).

Civil Division

- John Walter Birkett, Assistant to the Commonwealth Public Service Arbitrator.
- Keith Noel Everal Bradfield, First Assistant Director-General (Ground Facilities), Department of Civil Aviation, Victoria.
- Alexander John Campbell, Deputy Secretary, Department of Trade and Industry, Canberra.
- Phyllis Ellen Eileen Chandler, of Ashfield, New South Wales. For social welfare services.
- Francis John Davis, of Greensborough, Victoria. For public services.
- John Frederic Dredge, of Greenwich, New South Wales. For public services, especially as Secretary of the Australian Country Party.
- Kelvin Richard Ellis, of Rosanna, Victoria. For services to industry.
- Joseph Randolph Gibson, of Lutwyche, Queensland. For services to industry.
- Leslie Bruce Hamilton, First Assistant Secretary, Social Services Branch, Department of the Treasury, Canberra.
- The Reverend Harold Lawes Hawkins, Superintendent of the Leichhardt Methodist Mission, New South Wales.
- Francis Joel Horwood, of Geraldton, Western Australia. For services to primary industry.
- Ralph Augustus Hurman, Deputy Chairman, Repatriation Committee, Victoria.
- Walter Theodore King, of Strathfield, New South Wales. For public services.
- Francis Lyell Ley, Chief Electoral Officer for the Commonwealth of Australia.
- Colonel Malcolm Hugh McArthur, of Woollert, Victoria. For services to primary industry.
- Douglas Henry McKay, Director, Bureau of Agricultural Economics, Department of Primary Industry, Canberra.
- Mary Durack Miller, of Nedlands, Western Australia. For services to Australian literature.
- John Hereford Portus, DFC, Commonwealth Conciliation Commissioner.
- Alderman William Sheppard, of Strathfield, New South Wales. For public services.
- Robert Stanley Swift, First Assistant Secretary, Government and Social, Department of Territories, Canberra.

==== Member of the Order of the British Empire (MBE) ====
Military Division

Royal Australian Navy

- The Reverend Cyril David Alcorn, Royal Australian Naval Reserve.
- Supply Lieutenant Commander Vincent James Pilkington.

Australian Military Forces

- Major Douglas Chrisp (31462), Australian Staff Corps.
- 21398 Warrant Officer Class II Donald Wellow Baldwin Donkin, Royal Australian Artillery.
- Major John Talbot Dunn, MB (214655), Royal Australian Army Medical Corps.
- Major Terence Cecil Irwin (2142917), Royal Australian Infantry.
- Major James Stoddart Wilson (57537), Australian Staff Corps.
- 5270 Warrant Officer Class II Allan Kenneth Wright, Royal Australian Infantry.

Royal Australian Air Force

- Squadron Leader Norman Robin Wade (0217796).
- Flight Lieutenant Ronald Bruce Hayes (0210018).
- Warrant Officer Raymond John Francis (A11168).
- Warrant Officer Colin Leath Park (A11474).

Civil Division

- Francis Clyde Barnes, Public Relations Officer, Postmaster-General's Department, New South Wales.
- Dorothy Agnes Barnett, of Sylvania, New South Wales. For social welfare services, especially as Matron of the Dalmar Children's Home.
- Fam Choo Beng, Principal of the Asian School, Christmas Island, and Headmaster, Christmas Island Teaching Service.
- William Peter Bolger, of Richmond, Victoria. For services to the welfare of ex-servicemen and their dependants.
- William John Cahill, Chief Auditor, Banking Division, Commonwealth Auditor-General's Office, Sydney, New South Wales.
- Aleck Hugh Gelston Clarke, of North Balwyn, Victoria. For services in the interests of needy ex-Royal Australian Air Force Members and their wives.
- Taymar Eleonor Cosgrove, of Double Bay, New South Wales. For social welfare services.
- Jean Hilda Crittenden, Matron, Repatriation General Hospital, Hobart, Tasmania.
- Robert Henry Doyle, formerly Air Traffic Controller, Grade 6, Search & Rescue Section, Central Office, Department of Civil Aviation, Victoria.
- Clive Burton Edwards, lately Director, Statistical Branch, Department of Customs and Excise, Canberra.
- David William Elliman, of Canberra. For services to the welfare of ex-servicemen and women and their families.
- The Reverend Brother John Baptist Gallagher, Headmaster of Holy Cross College, Ryde, New South Wales.
- Arthur Clarence Gray, of Wahroonga, New South Wales. For public services.
- The Reverend George Richmond Harris. For services to Aborigines, especially as a member of the Church Missionary Society, in the Northern Territory.
- Frederick William Humphreys, Director of Social Services, Perth, Western Australia.
- William James Hunt, Musical Director of the Canberra Philharmonic Society.
- Alderman Ivan John Jack, Mayor of Wagga Wagga, New South Wales.
- Sydney Lorrimar Kirkby, Surveyor Class I, National Mapping Division, Department of National Development, Victoria.
- Henry Refshauge McKenzie. For social welfare services, especially in connection with the Good Neighbour Council of Victoria.
- Ian Roderick McLeod, Geologist Class II, Bureau of Mineral Resources, Geology & Geophysics, Department of National Development, Canberra.
- Eric Colin Stevenson Meldrum, of Largs Bay, South Australia. For public services.
- Oswald Francis Mingay, of St. Ives, New South Wales. For services to the broadcasting industry.
- Charles Alfred Nicol, Director of Public Relations, Department of the Army, Canberra.
- Patrick Edward Rice, Clerk, Enemy Property Section, Department of the Treasury, Canberra.
- Frederic Charles Speldewinde, Engineer, National Capital Development Commission, Canberra.

=== British Empire Medal (BEM) ===
Military Division
Royal Australian Navy

- Chief Petty Officer Quartermaster Gunner James Denis Curran.
- Chief Air Mechanician Terence Stanley Raftery.
- Chief Engineering Mechanic Allen John Robinson, R 20484.

Australian Military Forces

- 8494 Warrant Officer Class II (temporary) Bouwe/Pawa, Royal Australian Infantry.
- 29598 Sergeant (temporary) Terry Hunter Breakwell, Royal Australian Infantry.
- 34058 Warrant Officer Class II (temporary) Richard Edward Mansfield Garrett, Royal Australian Army Educational Corps.
- 41121 Sergeant Claude Alfred Dudley Hale, Royal Australian Infantry.
- 110732 Sergeant Owen Percy McGuiness, Royal Australian Artillery.
- 14910 Corporal James Eric Wieland, Royal Australian Infantry.

Royal Australian Air Force

- A32634 Flight Sergeant James Francis Frawley.
- A21716 Sergeant Ronald Albert Atkinson.
- A23879 Sergeant Robert Alexander McWhinney.

Civil Division

- The Reverend Walter Backholer, Black Rock, Victoria. For services to the deaf.
- Douglas Bain, Foreman Carpenter, Eastern Command Detachment, Australian Services Canteens Organisation.
- Archibald Stewart Cox, Queenscliff, New South Wales. For social welfare work.
- Jessie Mary Hale, Assistant Private Secretary to the Minister for the Interior.
- Douglas Robert Jordan, Senior Technical Officer, Garden Island Dockyard, Department of the Navy.
- The Reverend Mother Theresa McLaughlin, Cobgee, New South Wales. For services to the poor.
- Amy Jean Mary Livingston, Personal Secretary to the Director, Commonwealth X-Ray & Radium Laboratory, Department of Health, Melbourne.
- Edith Nellie Yates, Supervisor (F) (Typists) Grade 3, General Administration Branch, Department of Supply.

=== Royal Red Cross (RRC) ===
==== Associate of the Royal Red Cross (ARRC) ====
- Flight Officer Isobell Rita Jean Service (N15883), Royal Australian Air Force Nursing Service.

=== Air Force Cross (AFC) ===
Royal Australian Air Force

- Wing Commander Frederick Oscar Knudsen (033094).
- Squadron Leader Arthur Vernon Jackson (05348).
- Squadron Leader Cecil George Kilsby (033178).

=== Queen's Commendation for Valuable Service in the Air ===
Royal Australian Air Force

- Flight Lieutenant Stanley Gordon Hyland (021057).
- Flight Lieutenant Ronald Victor Anthony Johnston (0210747).
- Flight Lieutenant Kenneth John Tuckwell (025034).
- Flight Lieutenant Stuart Sutton Noel Watson (036302).
- A33700 Corporal Barry Thomas Ingate.

== Sierra Leone ==
=== Order of the British Empire ===
==== Commander of the Order of the British Empire (CBE) ====
Civil Division

- The Honourable Robert Granville Ojumeri King, MBE, JP, Minister of Finance.

==== Officer of the Order of the British Empire (OBE) ====
Civil Division

- Silvanus Bamidele Nicol-Cole, Deputy Governor, Bank of Sierra Leone.
- The Reverend William Elkanah Akinumi Pratt, Chairman and General Superintendent of the Methodist Church in Sierra Leone.
- Murietta Eyajemi Patricia Olu-Williams, Permanent Secretary, Ministry of Transport and Communications.

==== Member of the Order of the British Empire (MBE) ====
Military Division

- Warrant Officer Class I Dufana Boima, BEM (formerly known as Gbonkonka Boima), Royal Sierra Leone Regiment.
- Major Frank West, Royal Sierra Leone Military Forces.

Civil Division

- George Abraham Plummer Hamilton, Bursar and Chief Finance Officer, Fourah Bay College, University College of Sierra Leone.
- Daniel Kwesi Jenkins, District Officer, Bo, Southern Province.
- Paramount Chief Kaimakende, Gbense Chiefdom, Kono District, Eastern Province.

=== British Empire Medal (BEM) ===
Military Division

- Imam Grade I Alpha Imam Foday Kallay, Royal Sierra Leone Regiment.

Civil Division

- Christian Abu Kargbo, Customs and Excise Preventive Guard, Customs Department.
- Morris Latibi Kargbo, Supervisor of Schools, Bombali District, Northern Province.

== Jamaica ==
=== Knight Bachelor ===
- The Honourable Herbert George Holwell Duffus, President of the Court of Appeal.

=== Order of the British Empire ===
==== Commander of the Order of the British Empire (CBE) ====
Military Division

- Colonel (Honorary) Michael Ralph de Cordova, MBE, ED, Jamaica Army and Air Cadet Force.

Civil Division

- Lauritz Oswald Ramson. For public services, particularly in the field of commerce and industry.

==== Officer of the Order of the British Empire (OBE) ====
Civil Division

- Noel Joslyn Fraser. For public services, particularly in the field of industrial relations.
- Hedley Powell Jacobs, JP. For public services, especially in the literary and historical fields.

==== Member of the Order of the British Empire (MBE) ====
Military Division

- Major Frank Dudley Smith, Jamaica National Reserve.

Civil Division

- Edmund Newton Burke, Director, Social Development Agency, Jamaica Social Welfare Commission.
- Edward Percy Dorrien Greaves, Assistant Commissioner of Police.
- Lola Parkinson, JP. For social welfare services.

=== British Empire Medal (BEM) ===
Military Division

- Sergeant Alvin George Gough, Jamaica Defence Force.
- Staff-Sergeant Donald Mullings, Jamaica Defence Force.

Civil Division

- Eric Richmond Banks, Principal Public Health Officer, Ministry of Health.

== Malawi ==
=== Order of the British Empire ===
==== Commander of the Order of the British Empire (CBE) ====
Military Division

- Colonel (temporary) Thomas Paul Joseph Lewis, OBE (345649), Royal Corps of Transport, formerly Commander Malawi Army.

Civil Division

- Henry George Graham-Jolly, Secretary for Home Affairs.

==== Officer of the Order of the British Empire (OBE) ====
Civil Division

- Gordon Currie, MB, ChB, Government Leprologist.

==== Member of the Order of the British Empire (MBE) ====
Military Division

- Lieutenant John Owani, Malawi Rifles.

Civil Division

- John Edgar Acheson, Principal Forester.

=== Queen's Police Medal (QPM) ===
- Robert Douglas Hardman Holmes-A-Court, Senior Assistant Commissioner, Malawi Police Force.

== Gambia ==
=== Order of the British Empire ===
==== Commander of the Order of the British Empire (CBE) ====
Civil Division

- Kenneth John Winton Lane, MVO, OBE, Permanent Secretary to the Prime Minister and Secretary to the Cabinet.

==== Officer of the Order of the British Empire (OBE) ====
Civil Division

- Hector Davidson, Director of Agriculture.
- Wilfred Manly-Rollings, JP, Deputy Chairman, Public Service Commission.

==== Member of the Order of the British Empire (MBE) ====
Civil Division

- Alieu Momadou Lowe, Broadcasting Officer.
- Seyfu Ture Sanyang. For public services in Kombo East District.

=== British Empire Medal (BEM) ===
Civil Division

- Biney Batapa Drammeh, 2nd Grade Agricultural Instructor, Agricultural Department.
