= Anglo-Omani Society =

The British Omani Society الجمعية البريطانية العمانية
- Formation: January 1976
- Type: Friendship Society
- Legal status: Registered UK charity
- Purpose: Preserving the longstanding friendship between Britain and Oman
- Headquarters: 34 Sackville Street; London, W1
- Region served: UK & Sultanate of Oman
- Official language: English and Arabic (when appropriate)
- Patron: HM Sultan Haitham bin Tariq
- President: HE The Ambassador of the Sultanate of Oman
- Main organ: Board of Trustees
- Website: The Society's Website

The British Omani Society (formerly the Anglo-Omani Society)' (Arabic: الجمعية البريطانية العمانية'), is a London-based charitable organisation registered in the UK. It seeks to promote and sustain relations between Britain and the Sultanate of Oman. Membership of the society is open to Omani and British nationals who have lived in Oman or who have commercial, cultural or other interests in the Sultanate.

== The Society's Objectives ==
The Society seeks:

- To advance the education of the British public about all aspects of Oman.
- To advance the education of Omani nationals about all aspects of the UK.
- To improve understanding between Oman and the UK and to promote a lasting friendship between the UK and Oman.
- To provide bursaries, scholarships and grants for Omani and British students and projects.

The society has a calendar of general interest and specialist lectures scheduled throughout the year held at its London headquarters in 34 Sackville Street. It also holds a number of social events throughout the year attended by British and Omani dignitaries and society members.

One of the ways the society seeks to keep the friendly relations between the UK and Oman healthy is by actively encouraging links between the young people of both nations. The society's New Generation Group is the main vehicle for this engagement through exchange visits and events in both countries.

The society retains strong links with academic institutions in the UK and Oman e.g. the Sultan Qaboos University, St Antony's College, Oxford and the University of Exeter to name but a few.

The society also maintains close relations with other friendship groups that have members who have spent time in the Sultanate, e.g. the Sultan's Armed Forces Association.

== Omani British Business Council (OBBC) ==
The OBBC was formed to promote the close economic and commercial relationship between the Sultanate of Oman and United Kingdom and to develop bilateral trade, investment and other economic partnerships between the two countries.

== The Society's Records ==
The society's records are held as archived material at St Antony's College Middle East Centre Archive in Oxford.

A regular review of the society's activities is produced as an annual magazine, which is available on-line.

== Current Chairman ==
- Richard Stanford CB MBE - Major General (Retd) and previous Senior British Loan Service Officer to the Sultanate of Oman from 2017 - 2021.

== Previous Chairmen ==
The following are recorded as having held the post of society chairman:

- Stuart Laing
- Robert Alston CMG QSO DL.
- Richard Muir CMG
- Sir Terence Clark KBE CMG CVO
- Ivor Lucas
- Gordon Calver
- Donald Orde
- Sir Donald Hawley KCMG MBE - first chairman.

== The Society's Governance ==
Vice-Presidents

There are currently six vice-presidents who have normally fulfilled other senior posts in the society prior to their appointment. These are supported by the chairman (see above), a vice-chairman, a treasurer, a company secretary and a board of trustees (see below).

Trustees

The board of trustees is composed of society members, with additional co-opted members from the Embassy of Oman and the UK Foreign & Commonwealth Office.

== See also ==
- Oman
- St Antony's College, Oxford
- Embassy of Oman, London
