= Roy Price (diplomat) =

British civil servant and diplomat (1893–1976)

Sir Roy Price KCMG HFLon

British High Commissioner to New Zealand
- In office 1949–1953
- Preceded by: Sir Patrick Duff
- Succeeded by: Sir Geoffry Scoones

Personal details
- Born: 1 May 1893
- Died: 6 November 1976 (aged 83)
- Education: University College London
- Occupation: Diplomat and civil servant

Sir Charles Roy Price (1 May 1893 – 6 November 1976) was a British civil servant and diplomat who served as British high commissioner to New Zealand from 1949 to 1953.

== Early life and education ==
Price was born on 1 May 1893, the son of W. Sydney Price. He was educated at Wellington School, Somerset and University College London.

== Career ==
Price served in France during World War I with the Royal Garrison Artillery from 1915 to 1918 having been commissioned as a second lieutenant from the unattached list of the Territorial Force. In 1921, he joined the Colonial Office, before transferring to the Dominions Office in 1925. He attended various conferences as part of the UK delegation including, the Imperial Wireless and Cable Conference in 1928; the London Naval Conference in 1930; and the Disarmament Conference between 1932 and 1934. He was also a delegate at the League of Nations in 1928, 1932 to 1934, and in 1939.

From 1937 to 1939, Price served as joint secretary to the Oversea Settlement Board Assistant and then secretary at the Dominions Office. From 1940 to 1942, he was deputy high commissioner to the Union of South Africa and then, from 1948 to 1947, deputy high commissioner to Australia. In 1949, he was appointed high commissioner to New Zealand, a post he held until his retirement in 1953.

== Personal life and death ==
Price married Nora Sara Henderson in 1947. Price was appointed an Honorary Fellow of the University of London (HFLon).

Price died on 6 November 1976 aged 83.

== Honours ==
Price was appointed Companion of the Order of St Michael and St George (CMG) in the 1942 Birthday Honours, and promoted to Knight Commander (KCMG) in the 1950 New Year Honours.

== See also ==
- New Zealand–United Kingdom relations

Diplomatic posts
Preceded by Sir Patrick Duff	British High Commissioner to New Zealand; 1949–1953	Succeeded by Sir Geoffry Scoones
