= David Moss =

David Moss may refer to:

- David Moss (basketball) (born 1983), American basketball player
- David Moss (footballer, born 1952), English footballer, played for Luton Town and Swindon Town
- David Moss (footballer, born 1968), English footballer, played for Falkirk and Dunfermline Athletic
- David Moss (ice hockey) (born 1981), American ice hockey player
- David Moss (musician) (born 1949), US-American vocalist-percussionist and composer
- David Moss (diplomat) (born 1938), British diplomat
- David A. Moss (born 1964), Harvard business professor
- Dave Moss (CHERUB), a fictional character in the book series CHERUB
- Lasercorn, born David Moss, a personality on the YouTube channel SmoshGames
