= Eric Norris (diplomat) =

British diplomat (1918–2005)

Sir Eric George Norris KCMG

High Commissioner of the United Kingdom to Malaysia
- In office 1974–1977
- Preceded by: John Johnston
- Succeeded by: Donald Hawley

High Commissioner of the United Kingdom to Kenya
- In office 1968–1972
- Preceded by: Edward Peck
- Succeeded by: Antony Duff

Personal details
- Born: 14 March 1918
- Died: 15 March 2005 (aged 87)
- Children: 3
- Education: St Catharine's College, Cambridge
- Occupation: Diplomat

Sir Eric George Norris (14 March 1918 – 15 March 2005) was a British diplomat who served as High Commissioner of the United Kingdom to Kenya and High Commissioner of the United Kingdom to Malaysia.

== Early life and education ==
Norris was born on 14 March 1918, the son of H. F. Norris. He was educated at Hertford Grammar School and St Catharine's College, Cambridge.

== Career ==
After serving from 1940 to 1946 in the Royal Corps of Signals during World War II with the rank of major, Norris entered the Dominions Office, London in 1946. His first posting was to Ireland at the British Embassy, Dublin from 1948 to 1950. After serving in the UK High Commission in Pakistan, (1952–1955) and the UK High Commission in Delhi, (1956–57), he was appointed Deputy High Commissioner for the UK in Bombay, remaining in the post until 1960. In 1961, he spent a year on sabbatical at the Imperial Defence College before he returned to India as British Deputy High Commissioner in Calcutta, serving in the post from 1962 to 1965.

Norris returned to the UK and was at the Foreign Commonwealth Office in London from 1966 to 1968. In 1968, he was appointed High Commissioner to Kenya, his first High Commissioner posting. Five years after independence, opposition in the country to the large Asian communities was growing and painful memories of the British military response during the Mau Mau rebellion remained. According to The Times: "at the time relationships between Asians, Africans and Britons were strained, with the British High Commission in Nairobi in the eye of the storm. Norris, in his calm and understated way, held things together, and more than earned his KCMG, which came his way in 1969". He remained in the post until 1972.

Norris returned to the Foreign Commonwealth Office where he served as Deputy Under Secretary of State from 1972 to 1973. In 1974, he was dispatched to Kuala Lumpur as High Commissioner to Malaysia and served in the post until 1977.

After retiring from the diplomatic service Norris held directorships in Inchcape & Co; London Sumatra Plantations Ltd, and Gray Mackenzie Ltd, and in 1979, led a trade mission from the London Chamber of Commerce to Sabah and Sarawak.

== Personal life and death ==
Norris married Pamela Crane in 1941 and they had three daughters. Norris was chairman of the Royal Commonwealth Society from 1980 to 1984.

Norris died on 15 March 2005, aged 87.

== Honours ==
Norris was appointed Companion of the Order of St Michael and St George (CMG) in the 1963 Birthday Honours, and promoted to Knight Commander (KCMG) in the 1969 New Year Honours. He received the honorary appointment as Panglima Mangku Negara from Malaysia.

Diplomatic posts
Preceded by Edward Peck	High Commissioner of the United Kingdom to Kenya; 1968–1972	Succeeded by Antony Duff
Preceded by John Johnston	High Commissioner of the United Kingdom to Malaysia; 1974–1977	Succeeded by Donald Hawley
