= High Commission of the United Kingdom, Wellington =

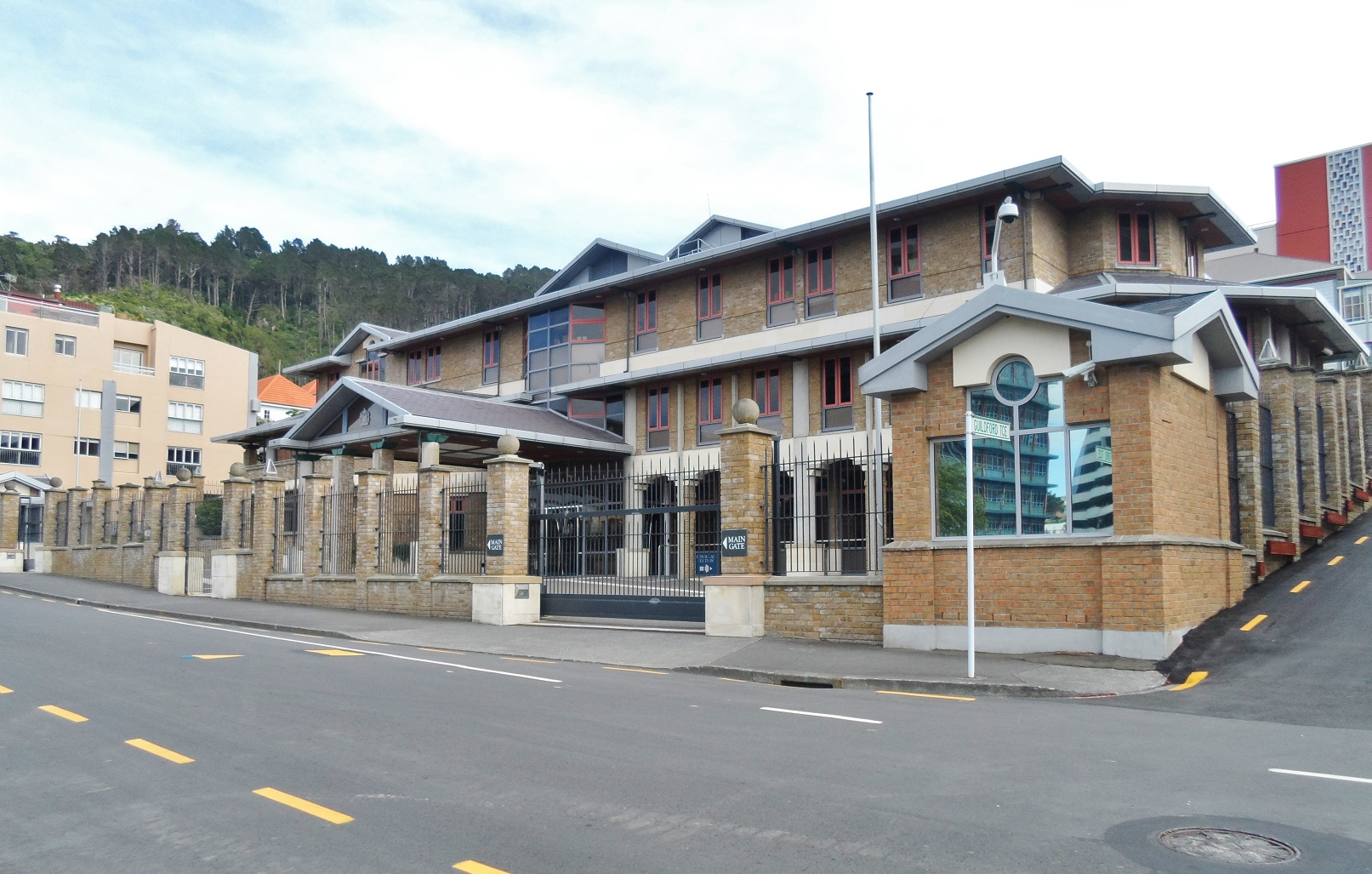
British High Commission in Wellington Komihana Teitei o Ingarangi i Poneke
- Location: (New Zealand) Thorndon, Wellington
- Address: 44 Hill St, Thorndon, Wellington 6011, New Zealand
- Coordinates: 41.2766°S 174.7749°E
- High Commissioner: John Pearson (acting)
- Website: Official website

The High Commission of the United Kingdom in Wellington (Māori: Komihana Teitei o Ingarangi i Poneke) is the chief diplomatic mission of the United Kingdom in New Zealand. It is located on Hill Street in the Thorndon suburb.

== History ==
Prior to 1939, the Governor-General of New Zealand was the official representative of the British government, as well as of the Crown. Since this time a High Commissioner has represented the British government.

The British High Commissioner to New Zealand is also non-resident Governor of the Pitcairn, Henderson, Ducie and Oeno Islands. The High Commission also represents the British Overseas Territories in New Zealand.

Outside Wellington, there is also a British Consulate-General in Auckland, where the senior officer is the Consul-General.

== See also ==
- New Zealand–United Kingdom relations
- List of diplomatic missions in New Zealand
- List of high commissioners of the United Kingdom to New Zealand
