= Graham Fry =

British diplomat (born 1949)

Sir Graham Fry KCMG

British Ambassador to Japan
- In office 2004–2008
- Monarch: Elizabeth II
- Prime Minister: Tony Blair; Gordon Brown
- Preceded by: Sir Stephen Gomersall
- Succeeded by: Sir David Warren

High Commissioner of the United Kingdom to Malaysia
- In office 1998–2001
- Monarch: Elizabeth II
- Prime Minister: Tony Blair
- Preceded by: Sir David Moss
- Succeeded by: Bruce Cleghorn

Personal details
- Born: 20 December 1949 (age 76)
- Education: Brasenose College, Oxford

Sir Graham Holbrook Fry, KCMG (born 20 December 1949) was British High Commissioner to Malaysia from 1998 to 2001 and British Ambassador to Japan from 2004 to 2008.

Fry was born on 20 December 1949. He was educated at Montpelier prep school at Paignton, Devon, and graduated from Brasenose College, Oxford University and joined the Foreign and Commonwealth Office in 1972. Following language courses at the University of Sheffield and Kamakura he became 2nd Secretary at the British Embassy in Japan in 1974.

Further appointments included the British Embassy Paris and Director, North Asian and Pacific of the Foreign and Commonwealth Office. He was High Commissioner to Malaysia from 1998 to 2001. In 2004 he was appointed Ambassador to Japan and he was knighted in the New Year Honours 2006 list. His wife is Lady Toyoko Fry. He has two sons, Gerald and Kenzo. Fry retired from the Diplomatic Service in July 2008. Fry has been a director of the Wildfowl and Wetlands Trust in the period, 2010–2012.

Diplomatic posts
Preceded by Sir David Moss	High Commissioner of the United Kingdom to Malaysia; 1998–2001	Succeeded by Bruce Cleghorn
Preceded by Sir Stephen Gomersall	British Ambassador to Japan; 2004–2008	Succeeded by Sir David Warren
