= Governor of Pitcairn =

UK governor of the Pitcairn Islands

The Governor of Pitcairn is the representative of the British monarch in the Pitcairn Islands, the last remaining British Overseas Territory in the Pacific Ocean.

Since its creation as a standalone office in 1970, the governorship has been held by the British high commissioner to New Zealand. Pitcairn has never had a resident governor and an equivalent role was historically held by the High Commissioner for the Western Pacific (1898–1952) and the Governor of Fiji (1952–1970). The current governor as of 2026 is Louise Cantillon.

== History ==
In 1898, the Colonial Secretary placed Pitcairn Island under the authority of the Fiji-based Western Pacific High Commission, largely for the purposes of convening a murder trial. The High Commissioner – a post held by the governor of Fiji – initially delegated his authority over Pitcairn to the British consul in Tahiti, who was appointed a deputy commissioner for that purpose. No visit to Pitcairn was undertaken by the consul until 1904. A revised law code imposed in the same year made the islands' local courts subject to the High Commissioner's Court.

Cecil Rodwell became the first and only High Commissioner to visit Pitcairn in 1921, staying for seven hours. Despite Rodwell's criticism of the local authorities, no British official visited the island again until 1936, when the British consul at Tahiti visited to hear another murder trial. In 1940, the High Commissioner despatched Henry Maude (and his wife Honor) to Pitcairn as its first resident deputy high commissioner, tasking him with imposing a new legal code and organising the Pitcairn postal service (producing souvenir postage stamps to boost the island's revenue). However, in 1951 the High Commissioner's Court declared that Maude's code had been issued ultra vires and the High Commissioner had no power under British law to create laws or courts on Pitcairn. An order-in-council was issued in 1952 to re-enact the code.

In 1952, the Western Pacific High Commission was relocated to the British Solomon Islands Protectorate. Pitcairn was removed from the jurisdiction of the High Commissioner and made a dependency of Fiji, administered by the governor of Fiji through the Pitcairn Office (later known as the Pitcairn and Tonga Office and the South Pacific Office). Pitcairn nonetheless remained subject to the High Commissioner's Court until 1961, when it was placed under the Supreme Court of Fiji.

On 10 October 1970, the date of Fiji's independence, the Pitcairn Order 1970 came into operation and created the new position of "Governor of the Islands" (defined as "the Islands of Pitcairn, Henderson, Ducie and Oeno"). The governorship was vested in the British high commissioner to New Zealand, with the administration based in the British consulate in Auckland.

== List of governors since 1970 ==
Pitcairn Islands
No.	Name (Birth–Death)	Title	Portrait	Tenure		Notes	Monarch
No.	Name (Birth–Death)	Title	Portrait	From	Until	Notes	Monarch
1	Sir Arthur Norman Galsworthy (1916-1986)	Governor of Pitcairn		October 1970	January 1973		Elizabeth II
2	Sir David Aubrey Scott (1919–2010)	Governor of Pitcairn		January 1973	1975		Elizabeth II
3	Sir Harold Smedley (1920–2004)	Governor of Pitcairn		February 1976	1980		Elizabeth II
4	Richard Stratton (1924–1988)	Governor of Pitcairn		September 1980	1984		Elizabeth II
5	Terence Daniel O'Leary (1928–2006)	Governor of Pitcairn		July 1984	1987		Elizabeth II
6	Robin Byatt (1930–2019)	Governor of Pitcairn		December 1987	1990		Elizabeth II
7	David Moss (born 1938)	Governor of Pitcairn		September 1990	1994		Elizabeth II
8	Robert John Alston (born 1938)	Governor of Pitcairn		August 1994	10 February 1998		Elizabeth II
9	Martin Williams (born 1941)	Governor of Pitcairn		April 1998	2001		Elizabeth II
10	Richard Fell (born 1948)	Governor of Pitcairn		10 December 2001	April 2006		Elizabeth II
11	George Fergusson (born 1955)	Governor of Pitcairn		2 May 2006	18 May 2010		Elizabeth II
–	Mike Cherrett (?–?)	Acting; Governor of Pitcairn		19 May 2010	3 June 2010		Elizabeth II
12	Victoria "Vicki" Treadell (born 1959)	Governor of Pitcairn		3 June 2010	July 2014		Elizabeth II
13	Jonathan Sinclair (born 1970)	Governor of Pitcairn		15 August 2014	9 December 2017		Elizabeth II
–	Robin Shackell (?–?)	Acting; Governor of Pitcairn		9 December 2017	25 January 2018		Elizabeth II
14	Laura Clarke (born 1978)	Governor of Pitcairn		25 January 2018	7 July 2022		Elizabeth II
15	Iona Thomas	Governor of Pitcairn		3 August 2022	April 2026		Elizabeth II
15	Iona Thomas	Governor of Pitcairn		3 August 2022	April 2026		Charles III
16	Louise Cantillon	Governor of Pitcairn		18 August 2026	Incumbent		Charles III

== See also ==
- List of rulers of the Pitcairn Islands, for local rulers since 1790
- List of high commissioners of the United Kingdom to New Zealand, for governors since 1970
