= Stuart Laing =

Stuart Laing may refer to:

- Stuart Laing (actor) (born 1969), London
- Stuart Laing (diplomat) (born 1948), British diplomat
