= Adrian Sindall =

British diplomat (born 1937)

Adrian Sindall CMG

11th British Ambassador to Syria
- In office 1994–1996
- Monarch: Elizabeth II
- Preceded by: Andrew Green
- Succeeded by: Basil Eastwood

6th British High Commissioner to Brunei
- In office 1991–1994
- Preceded by: Roger Westbrook
- Succeeded by: Ivan Callan

Personal details
- Born: 5 October 1937 (age 88)
- Spouse: Barbara Ann Endersby (m. 1958)
- Children: 2
- Education: Battersea Grammar School
- Occupation: Diplomat

Adrian John Sindall CMG (born 5 October 1937) is a diplomat and formerly the British High Commissioner to Brunei and Syria.

== Early life and education ==
Although both of Sindall's parents came from East Anglia, by the 1930s they had made London their home. At the time, his father was employed by the Pullman firm, which catered to railroads; he eventually rose to the rank of junior civil servant. Sindall did not attend university; instead, he attended Battersea Grammar School in south London.

Sindall submitted an application at the conclusion of my stay, was accepted, and by September 1958, he was traveling to Lebanon as a language learner to attend the Middle East Centre for Arab Studies (MECAS) to study Arabic. During his tenure, the director was Donald Maitland. He completed the entire advanced course and traveled to Baghdad in February 1960.

== Diplomatic career ==
On 9 April 1956, Sindall became a Grade 5 Officer in the Foreign Service's Branch B. he started working at the Carlton House Terrace-based Conference and Supply Department. His group was in charge of the Diplomatic Estate's general renovation, security, and lodging throughout the Middle East. It had been two years since the revolution that toppled the Hashemite monarchy when he traveled to Baghdad. He was a fairly junior diplomat at the time, and was mostly handling commercial job. He wasn't present for Kasem's overthrow since he completed his eighteen months in Iraq and departed just before it happened. In September 1962, he headed to Morocco as Third Secretary (Information), and worked in the press, radio, and television-friendly Information Office downtown. During that time, he was promoted to Second Secretary by Sir Richard Beaumont, to handle chancery tasks.

Sindall was appointed First Secretary at the Foreign and Commonwealth Office (FCO) in 1967–1970. During his time in Libya, he saw the 1969 Libyan revolution. He left for Beirut in early 1970s or early 1972. By the time he got there in 1970, the Palestine Liberation Organization (PLO) had made life in Beirut bearable through some type of arrangement that the Lebanese government, mostly through Walid Jumblatt, had managed to achieve. President Nasser died when he was in office there.

Sindall served as the British Embassy's First Secretary in Lima, Peru, in 1972–1976, to replace the retiring Stafford Campbell. From 1976 until 1979, he served as the FCO's Assistant Head of the Latin American Department. Returning to London, he found himself taking on that role, specifically addressing the recent issues surrounding the Falkland Islands. Human rights emerged as a significant problem during his tenure at the Latin American Department. He was scheduled to travel and have another change of scenery once my stint in Jordan ended, and was sent to the British Mission in Geneva. In 1982, he was appointed Head of the FCO's South American Department.

Following his departure from the South America Department, he served as Consul General in Sydney, Australia, from 1985 until 1988. As New South Wales was a state with its own bicameral legislature and a government consisting of ministers and a premier, he was in a sense nearly officially accredited as an ambassador. Following his time in Sydney, the FCO inquired whether he would be open to a secondment to the Ministry of Defence, where he would work as the Middle East's Regional Marketing Director for the Defence Export Services Organisation (DESO) from 1988 to 1991.

When Sindall served as High Commissioner in Brunei from 1991 to 1994, there was no obvious political instability and little concern for the Sultan's future. He had to give the salute at military parades and on several other occasions since he was a regular at the garrison. He noted that a person's performance as a British High Commissioner in Brunei depended in part on how well or poorly they got along with the Sultan. To enable the British soldiers to consume alcohol in their mess, he had to bargain with the Sultan for an alcohol permit.

In the end, he was named ambassador to Syria from 1994 to 1996. He had the good fortune to be working in Damascus as the first British Ambassador in decades during a period when bilateral relations between the two countries were flourishing. Early in 1994, he traveled to Syria, and in November or December of the same year, Farouk al-Sharaa visited London.

== Later life ==
Sindall would hold several other positions in different organisations and companies such as a consultant at the Greater London Fund (GLF) for the Blind Trustee Company from 1997 to 1999; Vision Foundation for London in 1999; GLF Charitable Purposes Trading Company from 1997 to 1999; Arab British Centre from 1997 to 2001; Council for British Research in the Levant from 1998 to 2004; the director of Medical Aid for Palestinians from 1997 to 1999; and the Midlington House Residents Association from 2003 to 2012. In addition to this he spoke on the Syrian civil war at The King's School, Canterbury in November 2017.

== Personal life ==
Born on 5 October 1937. Sindall married Barbara Ann Endersby in 1958, and together they have a daughter (born 1961) and son (born 1963).

== Honours ==
- Order of St Michael and St George Companion (CMG; 1993)

Diplomatic posts
Preceded by Andrew Green	British Ambassador to Syria; 1994–1996	Succeeded by Basil Eastwood
Preceded by Roger Westbrook	British High Commissioner to Brunei; 1991–1994	Succeeded by Ivan Callan
