= Terence Daniel O'Leary =

British diplomat (1928–2006)

His Excellency Terence Daniel O'Leary CMG

Governor of Pitcairn
- In office 1984–1988
- Monarch: Elizabeth II
- Prime Minister: Margaret Thatcher
- Preceded by: Richard Stratton
- Succeeded by: Robin Byatt

British High Commissioner to New Zealand and Samoa
- In office 1984–1987
- Monarch: Elizabeth II
- Prime Minister: Margaret Thatcher
- Preceded by: Richard Stratton
- Succeeded by: Robin Byatt

British High Commissioner to Sierra Leone
- In office 1981–1984
- Monarch: Elizabeth II
- Prime Minister: Margaret Thatcher
- Preceded by: Michael Hugh Moran
- Succeeded by: Richard Clift

Personal details
- Born: 18 August 1928
- Died: 11 July 2006 (aged 77)
- Occupation: Diplomat

Terence Daniel O'Leary CMG (18 August 1928 – 11 July 2006) was a British diplomat. He served as High Commissioner to Sierra Leone from 1981 to 1984 and High Commissioner to New Zealand from 1984 to 1988. While High Commissioner to New Zealand, he also served as Governor of Pitcairn.

O'Leary was educated at Dulwich College and St John's College, Cambridge, where he studied history.

He worked in the Commonwealth Relations Office from 1953 to 1956. He was second secretary at the High Commission to New Zealand in Wellington from May 1956 to March 1958, first secretary at the Commonwealth Relations Office in 1958, and first secretary in the High Commission to India in Delhi from 1960 to 1962. He worked at the High Commission to Tanganyika in Dar es Salaam from 1962 to 1963 and in the High Commission to Australia in Canberra from 1965 to 1968, when he returned to the Commonwealth Relations Office as first secretary.

He married Janet Douglas Berney in 1960.
