= Manchester bid for the 2000 Summer Olympics =

Bids for the 2000 Summer Olympics and Paralympics
Overview
- Games of the XXVII Olympiad; XI Paralympic Games
- Winner: Sydney; Runner-up: Beijing; Shortlist: Berlin · Istanbul · Manchester

Details
- City: Manchester, United Kingdom
- Chair: Bob Scott
- NOC: British Olympic Association

Evaluation
- IOC score: Round 1: 11; Round 2: 13; Round 3: 11

Previous Games hosted
- None

Decision
- Result: Third place

The Manchester bid for the 2000 Summer Olympics and Paralympics was an unsuccessful campaign, first presented to the International Olympic Committee (IOC) on 1 February 1993. Ultimately it lost, having made it to the third round of voting with Sydney, Australia, going on to win the right to host the 2000 Summer Olympics.

== Bid details ==
The bid was headed by Bob Scott, who also led the previous bid by Manchester for the 1996 Summer Olympics. The bid document was presented to the IOC on 1 February 1993, and was presented on 17 February 1993 by Prime Minister John Major in a press conference at 10 Downing Street to officially launch Manchester's bid. Major continued to show his support for the Manchester bid when prompted in interviews. Manchester's Olympic budget for their bid was £5.5 million.

The overall cost of the Manchester Olympics was estimated at £1.5 billion, with both private and taxpayer funding.

=== Venues ===
The venues included buildings which were already constructed as part of the previous Manchester bid for the 1996 Games. This included venues such as the Manchester Velodrome which cost £3 million, and other sites around East Manchester. Manchester Arena was to have hosted the gymnastics and the basketball, at the cost of £50 million, and was to be built regardless of the fate of Manchester's bid.

Old Trafford Cricket Ground was to have held the baseball events, and a swimming and diving centre would have been built in Wigan following a successful bid. Northern association football stadiums would have hosted the football events including Old Trafford, Goodison Park, Elland Road, Hillsborough, St James' Park, City Ground and Villa Park.

The Olympic Stadium itself was costed at £100 million, and would have seated 80,000 spectators. AMEC plc would have been tasked with organising the construction of the stadium had it been built from designs by architects including Arup Group Limited and Norman Foster. Some forty businesses were issued with compulsory purchase orders in order to free up the space to build the stadium, in the area around Eastlands towards the east of Manchester.

The table tennis and fencing events were to take place in Liverpool and the sailing events were to take place in Pwllheli, Wales.

The full list of venues were as follow:

- Archery - Carden Park, Cheshire (35 mn from OV, 5,000 spectators)
- Athletics - Olympic Stadium at Barton Cross (access by foot from OV, 80,000 spectators) - built for the Games
- Badminton - Ordsall Stadium in Salford (10 mn from OV, 5,000 spectators) - modular stadium (i.e. multi-purpose stadium) built for the Games
- Baseball - Old Trafford (15 mn from OV, 20,000) existing + Wytheshawe Park (10 mn, 10,000) new
- Basketball - new Manchester arena (15 mn, 12,000) - modular stadium built for the Games
- Boxing - Zeri stadium in Huncoat (20 mn, 12,000) - planned
- Canoeing - flat water on a planned extended lake at Pennington Flash (20 mn, 30,000), and whitewater in Burrs (20 mn)
- Cycling - Tameside Velodrome (20 mn)
- Swimming - Olympic Swimming Pool at Barton Cross (access by foot from OV, 8,000 for diving, 10,000 for swimming) - purpose built
- Equestrian - Haydock Park (15 mn, 40,000)
- Fencing - Festival Hall in Liverpool (4,000)
- Football - Old Trafford, Anfield, Goodison Park, Maine Road
- Gymnastics - the Olympic Arena at Barton Cross (access by foot, 20,000) - purpose built
- Handball - Oldham stadium (20 mn, 6,000) finals at the Olympic Arena - existing
- Hockey - Bolton (20 mn, 20,000)
- Judo - Modular Stadium of Platt Fields (15 mn, 5,000)
- Modern Pentathlon - Carden Park, Cheshire (running, shooting), Festival Hall in Liverpool (fencing), Haydock Park (equestrian), swimming at the Olympic Swimming Pool
- Rowing - planned extended lake at Pennington Flash (20 mn, 30,000)
- Shooting - Carden Park, Cheshire
- Table Tennis - King's Dock Stadium in Liverpool (30 mn, 10,000)
- Tennis - Matchpoint, Bramhall (20 mn, 10,000 + 2 * 3,000)
- Volleyball - G Mex (15 mn, 5,000) + finals at the Olympic Arena - under refurbishment
- Weightlifting - Granada Centre (10 mn, 6,000) - under construction
- Wrestling - Bolton Stadium (20 mn, 5,000) - to be built (Reebok Stadium)
- Sailing - Pwllheli

=== Olympic village ===
The Olympic village was to have been built along the Manchester Ship Canal in converted warehouses close to the sporting venues which would give athletes the ability to walk to 14 of the 25 venues. Every athlete would have had an individual bedroom in the properties.

=== Bid factors ===
The Manchester bid was fully supported by the Conservative government led by John Major, and it was seen as being a regenerative project for East Manchester with the Government providing additional funding for other local regeneration projects on top of that supplied for the Olympic bid.

== Outlook ==
Juan Antonio Samaranch, the President of the IOC had described Manchester's chances of hosting the Olympics as "very, very high" while speaking at Manchester Town Hall. A video presentation used by the bid team which included shots of the Pennines (a mountain range across Northern England) and of London, including Buckingham Palace and the Tower of London, which was described by British journalists as "bewildering" as it didn't concentrate on the host city. The IOC had published a report on 12 July 1993 regarding the technical aspects of the various bids for the 2000 Games; while Sydney was described as the favourite and Manchester too was praised, Beijing's application concerned the reviewers. Reporters considered that the Olympics would be hosted either by Sydney or Manchester, although felt that Beijing may have a chance as IOC members would be tempted by the chance to have an Olympics hosted in China.

The 2000 Games were awarded to Sydney on 23 September 1993, at the IOC meeting in Monte Carlo.

== Aftermath ==
In 1999, following the revelation of corruption in the bid process, the then Secretary of State for Culture Chris Smith threatened to sue the IOC for the money spent on Manchester's bid. This move was also supported by then Minister for Sport Tony Banks, and by the bid's leader, Bob Scott.

Manchester went on to host the 2002 Commonwealth Games. The stadium which would have been built for the 2000 Olympics was re-designed and built on the same site, becoming the City of Manchester Stadium as the central stadium for the 2002 Commonwealth Games, which now plays host to Manchester City F.C.

In the early stages of London's bid for the 2012 Summer Olympics in which London eventually chosen to host the 2012 Summer Olympics, Manchester was interested in conducting a joint bid between the two cities. However they were told by Richard Caborn, the Minister for Sport at the time, that Manchester "will have to look elsewhere". This was after the IOC had stated that they would only consider bids from London, and not elsewhere in the UK, but some members of the Committee maintained that Manchester could be a potential Olympic host city in the future.
