= Richard Fell =

British diplomat (1948- )

Richard Taylor Fell CVO (born 11 November 1948) was the British high commissioner to New Zealand and the colonial governor of the Pitcairn, Henderson, Ducie and Oeno Islands (of which only Pitcairn is inhabited) from 2001 to 2006.

He was educated at Bootham School, in York, followed by the University of Bristol and the University of London.

He joined the Foreign and Commonwealth Office (FCO) in 1971, after completing an MA in Area Studies (1971) at the Institute of Commonwealth Studies, University of London, serving in the South Asian Department. His first international post was a two-year stint in Ottawa, Canada, as 3rd Secretary. Since then he has served in Saigon (1974–1975, as 2nd Secretary), Vientiane (1975 on temporary duty), Hanoi (1979 as Chargé d'Affaires), Brussels (1979–1983, as a 1st Secretary with United Kingdom Delegation to NATO), Kuala Lumpur (1983–1986 as Head of Chancery), and Ottawa 1989–1993 as Counsellor, Economic/Commercial. He was Deputy Head of Mission in Bangkok 1993–1996, and Consul-General in Toronto in 2000.

He was in the Southern European Department of the FCO 1975–1976, and the Central and Southern African Department 1977–1978, as Assistant, South East Asian Department 1986–1988. In 1988–1989 he was on loan to industry, and 1996–1997 at the FCO on the Whitehall Scrutiny Review of Commercial Services. In 1997–2000 he was Head of Personnel Services Department. He spent 2000–2001 at the Royal College of Defence Studies.

Diplomatic posts
Preceded by Martin Williams	High Commissioner to New Zealand; 2001–2006	Succeeded by George Fergusson
