= William Bentley (diplomat) =

British diplomat (1927–1998)

Sir William Bentley KCMG

British Ambassador to Norway
- In office 1983–1987
- Preceded by: Gillian Brown
- Succeeded by: John Robson

British High Commissioner to Malaysia
- In office 1981–1983
- Preceded by: Donald Hawley
- Succeeded by: Lord Gillmore

British Ambassador to the Philippines
- In office 1976–1981
- Preceded by: James Turpin
- Succeeded by: Michael Morgan

Personal details
- Born: 15 February 1927
- Died: 10 June 1998 (aged 71)
- Children: 5
- Education: Manchester University, Wadham College, Oxford
- Occupation: Diplomat

Sir William Bentley (15 February 1927 – 10 June 1998) was a British diplomat who was British Ambassador to Norway from 1983 to 1987. He also served as High Commissioner of the United Kingdom to Malaysia from 1981 to 1983, and British Ambassador to the Philippines from 1976 to 1981.

== Early life and education ==
Bentley was born on 15 February 1927 in Bury, Lancashire, the son of Lawrence Bentley who taught at a college in the town. He was educated at Bury High School; University of Manchester; Wadham College, Oxford, and the College of Europe in Bruges. His education was interrupted for two years while he served with the RAF during the latter part of the War in its education department in the Azores.

== Career ==
Bentley joined the Diplomatic Service in 1952 and was dispatched to Japan where he was Third and later Second Secretary at the British Embassy in Tokyo (1952–1957). He returned to London where he was in the United Nations department at the Foreign Office (1957–1960) and then joined the UK Mission to the United Nations itself as First Secretary (1960–1963). He was in the Far Eastern department at the Foreign Office (1963–1965). He served his first term in Kuala Lumpur as Head of Chancery (1965–1969), and then returned to Japan as deputy commissioner-general of the British Pavilion at Expo '70 in Osaka (1969–70). He was counsellor in Belgrade (1970–1973), and then headed, successively, at the Foreign and Commonwealth Office, the permanent under-secretary’s department (1973–74) and the Far Eastern department (1974–1976).

Bentley was Ambassador to the Philippines between 1976 and 1981 and developed a good relationship with President Marcos and the government. Between 1981 and 1983 he was High Commissioner to Malaysia. His position became challenging following the election of Mahathir Mohamad who according to The Times, "in seeking to assert himself, was spoiling for a fight with the old colonial power." Measures detrimental to British business interests were introduced prompting Foreign Secretary, Lord Carrington to visit Malaysia to seek to limit the damage. Bentley's final posting was Ambassador to Norway from 1983 to 1987.

After retiring from the Diplomatic Service, Bentley was chairman of several companies involved in the North Sea Oil and Gas Industry, and chairman of the Society of Pension Consultants.

== Personal life and death ==
Bentley married Danish-born Karen Christensen in 1950 and they had two sons and three daughters. Bentley was a keen fisherman who was considered an authority on salmon and sea trout, and contributed articles to angling journals.

Bentley died on 10 June 1998 when he drowned in Scotland while on a fishing trip.

== Honours ==
Bentley was appointed Companion of the Order of St Michael and St George (CMG) in the 1977 Silver Jubilee and Birthday Honours, and promoted to Knight Commander (KCMG) in the 1985 New Year Honours.

Diplomatic posts
Preceded by James Turpin	British Ambassador to the Philippines; 1976–1981	Succeeded by Michael Morgan
Preceded by Donald Hawley	High Commissioner of the United Kingdom to Malaysia; 1981–1983	Succeeded by Lord Gillmore
Preceded by Gillian Brown	British Ambassador to Norway; 1983–1987	Succeeded by John Robson
