= Ivan Callan =

British diplomat

Sir Ivan Callan KCVO CMG

8th British Ambassador to Oman
- In office 1999–2002
- Monarch: Elizabeth II
- Preceded by: Richard Muir
- Succeeded by: Stuart Laing

10th British High Commissioner to Brunei
- In office 1986–1991
- Preceded by: Adrian Sindall
- Succeeded by: Stuart Laing

Personal details
- Born: 1942 (age 83–84)
- Education: University College
- Occupation: Diplomat

Sir Ivan Roy Callan KCVO CMG (born 1942) is a retired British diplomat.

Educated at University College, Oxford, Callan joined the Foreign and Commonwealth Office (FCO) in 1969 and was appointed to HM Diplomatic Service in 1972. He was appointed Consul-General at the British Embassy in Baghdad in 1983 and then moved to Jerusalem where he was Consul-General from 1987 to 1990. After returning to the FCO, he was appointed High Commissioner of Brunei (1994–98) and then Ambassador to Oman, serving from 1999 until retirement in 2002.

Callan was appointed a Companion of the Order of St Michael and St George in the 1990 Birthday Honours. He was also appointed a Knight Commander of the Royal Victorian Order in September 1998.

Diplomatic posts
| Preceded by Sir Richard Muir | British Ambassador to Oman; 1999–2002 | Succeeded by Stuart Laing |
| Preceded by Adrian Sindall | British High Commissioner to Brunei; 1986–1991 | Succeeded by Stuart Laing |
