= Richard Stratton (diplomat) =

British diplomat (1924–1988)

Sir Richard Stratton KCMG

British High Commissioner to New Zealand and Samoa
- In office September 1980 – July 1984
- Monarch: Elizabeth II
- Prime Minister: Margaret Thatcher
- Preceded by: Harold Smedley
- Succeeded by: Terence Daniel O'Leary

Governor of Pitcairn
- In office September 1980 – July 1984
- Monarch: Elizabeth II
- Preceded by: Harold Smedley
- Succeeded by: Terence Daniel O'Leary

British Ambassador to Rwanda
- In office 1977–1977
- Monarch: Elizabeth II
- Prime Minister: James Callaghan

British Ambassador to Burundi
- In office 1975–1977
- Monarch: Elizabeth II
- Prime Minister: Harold Wilson; James Callaghan

British Ambassador to Zaire and the Congo
- In office 1974–1977
- Monarch: Elizabeth II
- Prime Minister: Harold Wilson; James Callaghan
- Preceded by: Mark Allen
- Succeeded by: Alan Donald

Personal details
- Born: 16 July 1924 London, England
- Died: 26 July 1988 (aged 64)
- Education: Merton College, Oxford
- Profession: Diplomat

Sir Richard James Stratton KCMG (16 July 1924 – 26 July 1988) was a British diplomat. He served as the ambassador to Zaire and the Congo from 1974 to 1977, to Burundi from 1975 to 1977, and to Rwanda in 1977. He later was the high commissioner to New Zealand and Samoa from 1980 to 1984 and thus also the Governor of Pitcairn.

== Early life and education ==
Stratton was born on 16 July 1924 in London, and was educated at the King's School, Rochester, in Kent. He later attended Merton College, Oxford. He served in World War II for the British Army as a member of the Coldstream Guards. After the war, he joined the Foreign Office in 1947. Among early positions he held in the office were private secretary to the under secretary of state and private secretary to Lord Carrington.

== Diplomatic career ==
Stratton worked in Rio de Janeiro, Brazil, in 1948. He later worked abroad in 1953 with the British Embassy in Tokyo, Japan. It was followed by work in Seoul, South Korea; the NATO Defence College in Paris, France; Bonn, Germany; Abidjan, Ivory Coast; and Rawalpindi, Pakistan. He was appointed the counsellor and head of chancery to the high commission in Pakistan in 1966. Though having no previous experience in the region, according to the Daily Telegraph he was able to quickly adapt to challenging circumstances, including the aftermath of the 1965 Indo-Pakistani war and Pakistan's democratization experiments.

Stratton served as head of the political department for the United Nations in the Foreign and Commonwealth Office from 1971 to 1972. He then worked as an advisor to Hong Kong governor Murray MacLehose from 1972 to 1974. In the 1974 Birthday Honours, he was appointed Companion of the Order of St Michael and St George (CMG). He was named the British Ambassador to Zaire and the Congo in 1974, where his fluent French proved advantageous. He added the post of ambassador to Burundi in 1975 and the title of British Ambassador to Rwanda in 1977, before leaving all three of his ambassadorial roles later in 1977. He then was the Assistant Under-Secretary for Foreign and Commonwealth Affairs from 1977 to 1980.

In 1980, Stratton succeeded Harold Smedley as the British High Commissioner to New Zealand and Samoa. As high commissioner, Stratton also thus held the role of Governor of Pitcairn. In 1982, he visited the Pitcairn Islands and discussed with the Island Council about Pitcairn's future development, which marked the first visit to the islands from the Governor of Pitcairn since 1976. He was succeeded as high commissioner and governor of Pitcairn by Terence Daniel O'Leary in 1984.

== Retirement and death ==
Stratton was promoted to Knight Commander of the Order of St Michael and St George (KCMG) in the 1982 Birthday Honours. After his career as a diplomat, he was an active member of the New Zealand Society in London. He never married. He died on 26 July 1988, at the age of 64. His obituary in The Times called him "gregarious and a great traveller ... a diplomat of the old school who knew how to cultivate the right people" and described his "career which virtually spanned the world, taking him from South America to Japan, and from Southern Africa to the foothills of the Himalayas."
