= Edward Peck (British diplomat) =

British diplomat, climber and author

Sir Edward Heywood Peck GCMG (5 October 1915 – 24 July 2009) was a British diplomat, climber and author. He was grandfather of the noted writer and scholar Robert Macfarlane.

== Career ==
Edward Heywood Peck was educated at Clifton College and The Queen's College, Oxford, where he gained first-class honours in modern languages and then held a Laming Travelling Fellowship 1937–38, during which he climbed in the Alps and was in Vienna at the time of the Anschluss. He then joined the Consular Service of the Foreign Office (FO) and was posted to Barcelona 1938–39, including the final months of the Spanish Civil War. As the Consular Service was a reserved occupation, Peck continued in the service during World War II and served at first in the FO, then at Sofia, at Ankara 1940–44, at Adana and at İskenderun. After the war he was vice-consul at Salonica 1945–47 during the Greek Civil War.

He was part of the British delegation to a United Nations Special Commission on the Balkans in 1947, which caused the Soviet Union to reject his proposed posting to Moscow. Instead he returned to the FO, with a posting to the High Commissioner's office at New Delhi 1950–52.

Peck was in Berlin 1955–58 as the (civilian) deputy commandant of the British sector. He was on the staff of the regional Commissioner-General for South-East Asia 1959–60, an Assistant Under-Secretary at the FO 1961–66, High Commissioner to Kenya 1966–68, deputy to the Permanent Under-Secretary of State for Foreign Affairs and chairman of the Joint Intelligence Committee 1968–70, and Permanent Representative to the North Atlantic Council (the governing body of NATO) 1970–75.

Peck then retired to Scotland, where he was director of the Outward Bound school at Loch Eil 1976–90. He was also on the council of the National Trust for Scotland 1982–87 and a visiting fellow in defence studies 1976–1985 at Aberdeen University, which gave him an honorary doctorate in 1997.

Peck was appointed CMG in the Queen's Birthday Honours of 1957, knighted KCMG in the Birthday Honours of 1966 and raised to GCMG in the Birthday Honours of 1974. He was elected to the Alpine Club (UK) in 1944.

== Publications ==
- North-East Scotland (Bartholomew's Guides Series), Bartholomew, 1981. ISBN 0702880213
- Avonside explored: a guide to Tomintoul and Glenlivet, self-published, 1983. ISBN 0950855308
- The Battle of Glenlivet, Avonside Conservation Group, 1993. ISBN 0950855316

Diplomatic posts
Preceded by Malcolm MacDonald	High Commissioner to Kenya; 1966–1968	Succeeded by Sir Eric Norris
Preceded by Sir Bernard Burrows	Permanent Representative to the North Atlantic Council; 1970–1975	Succeeded by Sir John Killick
