= Bids for the 2000 Summer Olympics =

Bids for the 2000 Summer Olympics and Paralympics
Overview
- Games of the XXVII Olympiad; XI Paralympic Games
- Winner: Sydney; Runner-up: Beijing; Shortlist: Berlin · Istanbul · Manchester

Details
- Committee: IOC
- Election venue: Monte Carlo; 101st IOC Session

Map of the bidding cities

Important dates
- Decision: 23 September 1993

Decision
- Winner: Sydney (45 votes)
- Runner-up: Beijing (43 votes)

Five cities made presentations to the 101st IOC Session in Monte Carlo to host the 2000 Summer Olympics. The Games were awarded to Sydney, Australia, on 23 September 1993 at 18:17 UTC (8:17 pm in Monaco (UTC+02:00), 4:17 am in Sydney, 24 September 1993 (UTC+10:00)). The other cities were Beijing (China), Manchester (Great Britain), Berlin (Germany) and Istanbul (Turkey). 11 days earlier in a different process, Sydney had been chosen by the International Paralympic Committee to host the 2000 Summer Paralympics.

== Events ==
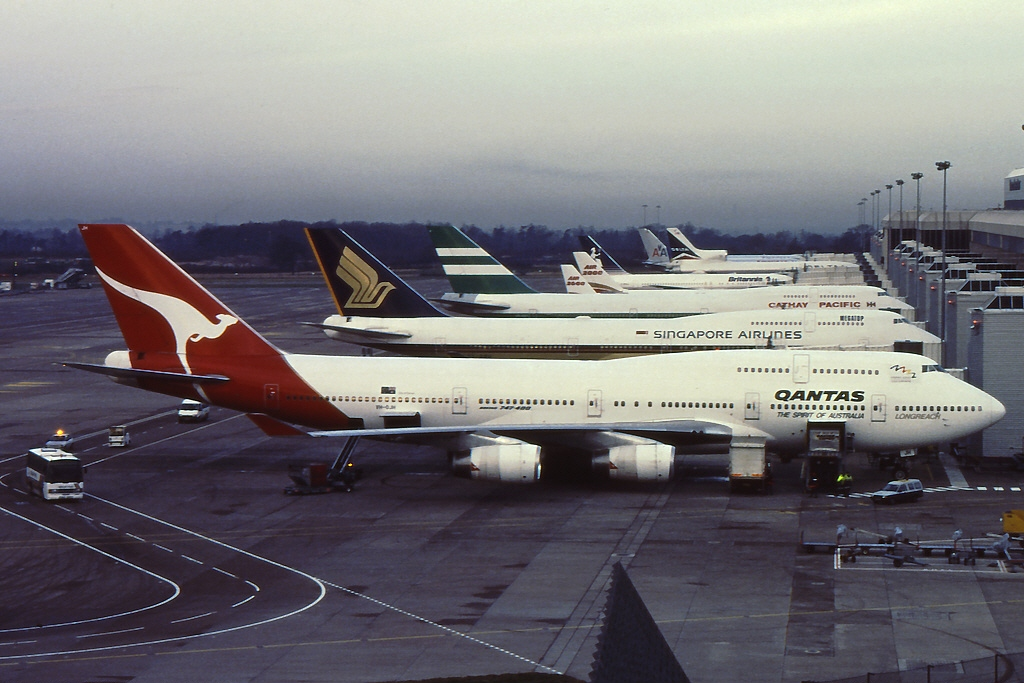
A Qantas Boeing 747-400 with Sydney Olympic bid stickers at Manchester Airport, circa 1993

The Australian Olympic Committee originally contemplated either Melbourne or Brisbane as their preferred bidding host cities, but Sydney gained popular favor amongst AOC President John Coates, and others, having never been a host city, as they were the last Australian bidding cities. Brasília, the capital city of Brazil, and Milan, Italy, withdrew during the bidding process – Milan shortly after submitting its bid book, Brasília following the visit by the IOC Inspection Group, which stated the city had substandard facilities. Tashkent, Uzbekistan, also put in a bid for the Games, in order to gain some recognition of that country's existence and new independence, but withdrew very early into the race.

Berlin was an early front-runner, hoping to cap the decade of German reconstruction and reunification by hosting the first Games of the new millennium. But the support of its bid was marred when anti-Olympic protesters marched through the city just four days before the final vote in Monaco claiming that the games would deny funds to further domestic reconstruction efforts. Manchester's bid book was thought strong, but with much regeneration in the city needed. A promotional video shown to the IOC depicting London landmarks such as Buckingham Palace and Tower Bridge was criticized heavily by the British media who said that Manchester's bid was 'suffering from an identity crisis'. The work that went into Manchester's unsuccessful Olympic bid was reused on a smaller scale for the 2002 Commonwealth Games bid in which Manchester won.

The impending announcement of the host city came down to a head-to-head between Sydney and Beijing with Manchester, Berlin and Istanbul ranked outsiders. With China's suppression of protests in Tiananmen Square in 1989 still fresh in the minds of many in the West, Human Rights Watch launched a major media campaign to influence members of the International Olympic Committee to vote against awarding the Games to Beijing on human rights grounds. The campaign was one of the earliest efforts to claim that Olympic hosts should meet human rights tests.

IOC president Juan Antonio Samaranch thanked by name alphabetically the five competing cities before announcing the winning bid. Many Chinese in Beijing mistook his utterance of the city's name as an announcement that it had been awarded the Games, and widespread celebrations began. These were cut short just minutes later when images from Sydney came through, showing that the Australian city had won.

The International Paralympic Committee then awarded the 2000 Summer Paralympics to Sydney.

== Proposed dates ==
Sydney	16 September - 1 October
Beijing	26 August - 10 September
Manchester	22 July - 6 August
Berlin	22 July - 6 August
Istanbul	15 - 30 August
Milan	29 July - 13 August
Brasilia	1 - 16 July

Note: (Note: Between the awarding of the bid and the Games themselves, the Games were extended from 16 to 17 days.)

== Reactions ==
The Beijing loss to Sydney was seen as a "significant blow" to an "urgent political priority" of the Communist Party leadership, which had mounted the most vigorous 2000 Olympic games campaign of any nation. A win would "validate China's return to the international stage" after several years of diplomatic isolation following the 1989 Tiananmen Square crackdown. There had been concerns raised about the Beijing bid: air pollution, overcrowded streets, and mass transit. Chinese officials disregarded these problems and solely blamed Western political motivation as critical to the bid's failure. U.S. politicians Tom Lantos and Bill Bradley had lobbied the IOC. Lantos said, "Human rights and decency must prevail in a society before they have the privilege of hosting the Olympics".

Before the vote, the US intelligence community reported that should Beijing lose the bid, the Chinese government would resume underground nuclear testing, despite the worldwide moratorium on the process. As the news of the failed bid spread, university students in Beijing made plans to march on the American embassy in Beijing. Police presence was stepped up across Beijing University campuses to prevent the incident. Also, Chinese officials speculated that Beijing would boycott the 1996 Summer Olympics because of the failed bid.

Beijing would successfully bid for and host the 2008 Summer Olympics, having promised freedom of the press for foreign media and improved human rights to assuage critics, although they reneged on these promises during the Summer Games. Beijing also won the bid for the 2022 Winter Olympics, becoming the first city to host Summer and Winter Olympics.

Investigations were later launched into the prior bidding process by some cities, finding that two African members of the IOC received US$35,000 each from Australian Olympic Committee President John Coates during the bidding process for Sydney's 2000 Summer Olympics. Prior to the 2000 Olympics bidding, the Australia Olympic Committee offered Africa's nations training scholarships to its athletes to train in Adelaide in the lead up to the Sydney Games. The visiting 400 athletes from 11 African nations and their coaches took part in the special Olympic Training Camp. Under the program, they received accommodation, meals, use of training facilities, local transport, and access to sports medicine experts. The Program provided $2 million in total to support the development of Africa's athletes and coaches who participated in the 2000 Olympic Games.

== Final selection ==
2000 Summer Olympics bidding results
City	NOC Name	Round 1	Round 2	Round 3	Round 4
Sydney	Australia	30	30	37	45
Beijing	China	32	37	40	43
Manchester	Great Britain	11	13	11	—
Berlin	Germany	9	9	—	—
Istanbul	Turkey	7	—	—	—
