= Simon Featherstone =

British diplomat (1958–2014)

Simon Featherstone CMG
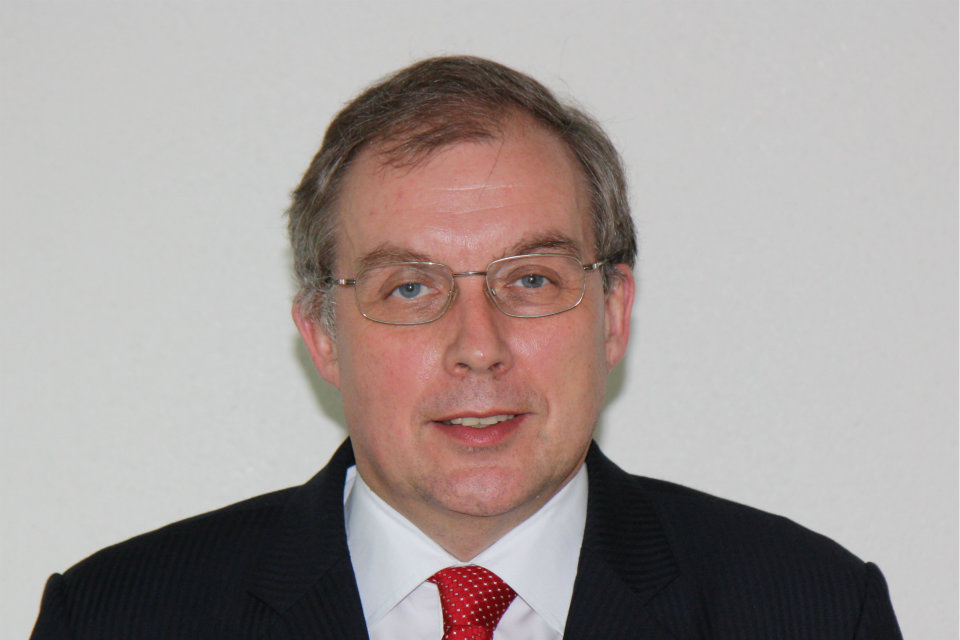
- Born: 24 July 1958
- Died: 26 August 2014 (aged 56)
- Education: Lincoln College, Oxford
- Occupation: Diplomat

Simon Mark Featherstone CMG (24 July 1958 – 26 August 2014) was a British diplomat whose posts included High Commissioner to Malaysia.

== Career ==
Simon Featherstone was educated at Whitgift School and Lincoln College, Oxford. He joined the Foreign and Commonwealth Office in 1980 and after language training at SOAS and in Hong Kong served in Beijing, Brussels and Shanghai.

He was British ambassador to Switzerland and non-resident ambassador to Liechtenstein 2004–08, the Prime Minister's International Representative on Energy Issues in 2008, UK director for the 2010 Shanghai Expo (where the UK pavilion won the award for best pavilion design) and was British High Commissioner to Malaysia from October 2010 until ill health forced him to retire in May 2014.

While in Malaysia, he was also one of the patrons of the British Theatre Playhouse, a theatrical and musical production company that works with British entertainment shows.

Featherstone was appointed Companion of the Order of St Michael and St George (CMG) in the New Year Honours of 2011.

Diplomatic posts
Preceded by Basil Eastwood	Ambassador to Switzerland and Liechtenstein; 2004–2008	Succeeded by John Nichols
Preceded by Boyd McCleary	High Commissioner to Malaysia; 2010–2014	Succeeded by Victoria Treadell
