= Martin Williams (diplomat) =

British diplomat

High Commissioner to New Zealand
- In office 1998–2001
- Preceded by: Robert Alston
- Succeeded by: Richard Fell

Personal details
- Born: Martin John Williams
- Spouse: Sue Williams
- Children: 2

Martin John Williams CVO OBE (born 3 November 1941), is a British diplomat. He was High Commissioner to New Zealand and concurrently the Governor of the Pitcairn Islands from 1998 to 2001. As of 2012. William serves as a consultant to the New Zealand Antarctic Heritage Trust.

== Personal life ==
Williams was born on 3 November 1941. He is married to the artist Sue Williams. They have 2 sons, born 1966 and 1967.

== Career ==
Williams is a career member of the British Foreign Office having entered the FCO in 1963. His assignments include 1993-95 On loan to Northern Ireland Office, 1990-92 FCO (Head of South Asian Department), 1986-90 ROME (Head of Chancery), 1982-85 NEW DELHI (Head of Chancery), 1980-82 FCO (Assistant Head, Aid Policy Department), 1977-80 TEHRAN (First Secretary Commercial and Head of Chancery), 1974-77 FCO (Marine and Transport Department), 1972-73 FCO (On loan to Civil Service College), 1970-72 MILAN (Vice Consul Commercial), 1966-69 MANILA (Second Secretary Political), 1965-66 FCO (On loan to Civil Service College), 1964-65 FCO (Private Secretary to Permanent Under-Secretary), and 1963-64 FCO (Constitutional Department).

Diplomatic posts
Preceded by Robert Alston	High Commissioner to New Zealand; 1998–2001	Succeeded by Richard Fell
