= David Warren (diplomat) =

British diplomat (born 1952)

Sir David Warren KCMG
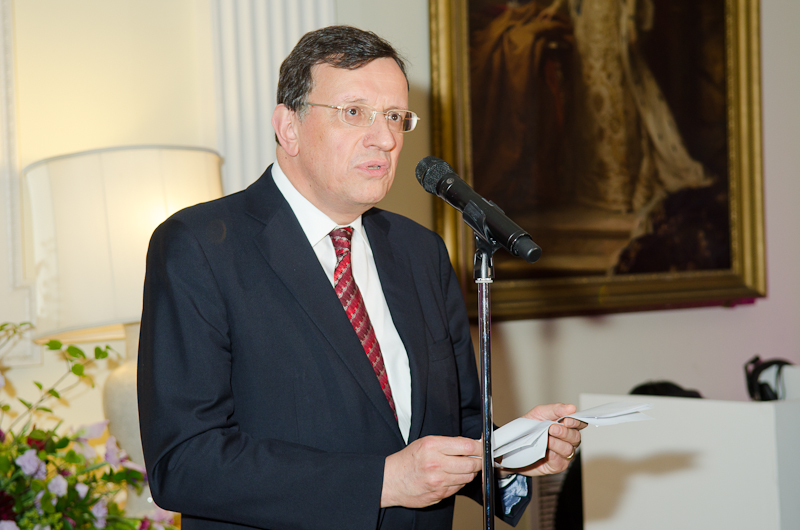
- Warren in June 2012

British Ambassador to Japan
- In office 2008 – November 2012
- Monarch: Elizabeth II
- Prime Minister: Gordon Brown; David Cameron
- Preceded by: Sir Graham Fry
- Succeeded by: Tim Hitchens

Personal details
- Born: August 11, 1952 (age 73)
- Education: Epsom College
- Alma mater: Exeter College, Oxford; SOAS, University of London

Sir David Alexander Warren, KCMG (born 11 August 1952) is a retired British diplomat, who served as HM Ambassador to Japan from August 2008 to November 2012.

== Biography ==
Educated at Homefield Preparatory School when on Grove Road in Sutton, Surrey, Epsom College and Exeter College, Oxford, Warren joined the Foreign and Commonwealth Office in 1975. He studied Japanese between 1976 and 1978 at the School of Oriental and African Studies, University of London, and at the British Embassy language school in Kamakura, Japan.

Warren dealt with EU/Japan trade and economic relations (and multilateral trade policy issues more generally) in the FCO's European Community Department from 1983 to 1986. From 1987 to 1990, he served as Head of the Political Section in the British High Commission in Nairobi, Kenya. He returned to London as the Deputy Head of the FCO's Far Eastern Department from 1990 to 1991. He was seconded to the Cabinet Office (Office of Science and Technology) for two years from 1991, as the Head of the International Division, dealing among other issues with UK/Japan science and technology co-operation.

Following his second tour of duty in Tokyo as Commercial Counsellor, from 1998 to 2000 he was the Head of the FCO's Hong Kong (later China Hong Kong) Department. In 2000, he became one of the Directors and senior management team for the new Government trade promotion organisation, British Trade International, later UK Trade and Investment, where he spent the next four years in charge of different aspects of sector and market-oriented international trade development. In 2004, he was appointed Director, Human Resources, for the FCO, and a member of the FCO Board of Management.

Having already been invested Companion of the Order of St Michael and St George (CMG), Warren was advanced Knight Commander of the Order of St Michael and St George (KCMG) in the 2012 New Year Honours.

He retired from the Foreign and Commonwealth Office in 2013. He was a member of the Council of the University of Kent between 2013 and 2021, and served as Chair of Council between 2014 and 2020. He served as Chair of the Nursing and Midwifery Council from June 2021 to March 2025. He was a non-executive director of Aberdeen (later abrdn) Japan Investment Trust from 2015 to its merger with another fund in 2023.

He was Chair of the Japan Society of the UK from 2013 to 2019, and is a Trustee of Japan House London and a member of the management board of the Sainsbury Institute for the Study of Japanese Arts and Culture at the University of East Anglia.

He is writing a biography of Sir Ernest Satow, British Minister to Japan from 1895 to 1900, and won the 2025 Elizabeth Buccleuch Prize, awarded by the Biographers' Club, for the best proposal for an uncommissioned first biography, for 'Sir Ernest Satow: a Victorian Diplomat and the Birth of Modern Japan'.

== Honours ==
- Grand Cordon of the Order of the Rising Sun (2018)

== Sources ==
- Brit envoy, three Japanese staff hailed for disaster efforts, Japan Times, 1 January 2012.
- Britain appoints new ambassador, Japan Times, 4 March 2012
- Nuclear recycling program to continue amid looming storage crisis, Japan Times, 14 September 2012.
- Hollingworth, William (2012) More deregulation needed to attract investment: former British ambassador, Japan Times, 28 November 2012

Diplomatic posts
| Preceded by Sir Graham Fry | British Ambassador to Japan; 2008–2012 | Succeeded by Tim Hitchens |
