= Christopher Kelly (historian) =

Australian classicist and historian (born 1964)

Christopher Kelly (born 1964) is a British-Australian (born in London raised in Sydney) classicist and historian, who specialises in the later Roman Empire and the classical tradition. He has been Master of Corpus Christi College, Cambridge, since 2018.

== Biography ==
Kelly attended Sydney Grammar School, where he graduated in 1981. He then studied history and law at the University of Sydney as an undergraduate. In 1984 he and David Celermajer (individual winner of the public speaking competition) represented the University of Sydney as champions at the World Universities Debating Championship in Edinburgh.

He came to Trinity College, Cambridge in 1986, presided over the Cambridge Union in Easter term 1988 and within 7 years had earned a doctorate. His doctoral thesis was titled "Corruption and bureaucracy in the later Roman Empire", and was submitted in 1993.

Kelly is Professor of Classics and Ancient History in the Faculty of Classics, University of Cambridge. He is a previous chairman of the faculty. From 2006 to 2008, he held a Leverhulme Trust Major Research Fellowship.

Kelly is married to Shawn Donnelley, an American philanthropist and great-great-granddaughter of R.R. Donnelley & Sons founder Richard Robert Donnelley. They met in Corpus Christi College in 2000 and married in Chicago in 2008. Donnelley founded and is President of Strategic Giving, a firm providing consultation on philanthropy; she has numerous ties to Cambridge including being elected as Guild [of Benefactors] Fellow, reserved for Corpus Christi College's most generous supporters. The couple continues to donate generously to the College.

On 12 July 2017, he was elected Master of Corpus Christi College, Cambridge. His term as Master began in Michaelmas 2018. His appointment follows his tenure as senior tutor in the early 2000s, when he was strongly criticised by some members of the student body for his policies, and the college JCR threatened to refuse to acknowledge his plans to assign rooms based on exam results.

== Academic work ==
Kelly was editor of the Proceedings of the Cambridge Philological Society and Cambridge Classical Journal from 2000 to 2006. He was editor of the Journal of Roman Studies from 2018 to 2019, and was President of the Cambridge Philological Society.

Kelly's first major work was Ruling the Later Roman Empire (2006). In The End of Empire (2009), characterised as a "semi-popular work", he took a revisionist view of Attila the Hun as a "thoughtful and effective political and military leader."

Kelly contributed to The Cambridge Ancient History and to Late Antiquity: A Guide to the Postclassical World, edited by G. W. Bowersock, Peter Brown, and Oleg Grabar. He is an occasional reviewer for publications such as London Review of Books, Literary Review, and History Today.

== Selected works ==
- Ruling the Later Roman Empire. Harvard University Press. 2006. ISBN 9780674022447.
- The Roman Empire: A Very Short Introduction. Very Short Introductions. Oxford University Press. 2006. ISBN 97 80192803917.
- The End of Empire: Attila the Hun and the Fall of Rome. New York: Norton. 2009. ISBN 978-0393338492.
- As editor: Unclassical Traditions. Vol. I (Alternatives to the Classical Past in Late Antiquity). Cambridge University Press. 2010.
- As editor: Unclassical Traditions. Vol. II (Perspectives from East and West in Late Antiquity). Cambridge University Press. 2011.
- As editor: Theodosius II: Rethinking the Roman Empire in Late Antiquity. Cambridge University Press. 2013.
- As editor: Keith Hopkins: Sociological Studies in Roman History. Cambridge University Press. 2018.

Academic offices
Preceded by Stuart Laing	Master of Corpus Christi College, Cambridge; 2018–present	Incumbent
