= Roger Westbrook =

British diplomat

Roger Westbrook CMG

British Ambassador to Portugal
- In office 1995–1999
- Monarch: Elizabeth II

9th British High Commissioner to Tanzania
- In office 1992–1995
- Preceded by: Thorold Masefield
- Succeeded by: Alan Montgomery

13th British Ambassador to Zaire
- In office 1991–1992
- Preceded by: Robert Cormack
- Succeeded by: Marcus Hope

10th British High Commissioner to Brunei
- In office 1986–1991
- Preceded by: Francis Cornish
- Succeeded by: Adrian Sindall

Personal details
- Born: 26 May 1941
- Parent(s): Edward George Westbrook (father); Beatrice Minnie Marshall (mother)
- Education: (MA)
- Occupation: Diplomat

Roger Westbrook CMG (born 26 May 1941), is a British former diplomat and formerly the British High Commissioner to Brunei, Tanzania and Ambassador to Zaire and Portugal.

== Early life ==
Westbrook was born on 26 May 1941 and educated at Dulwich College and Hertford College.

== Diplomatic career ==
Westbrook's diplomatic career began after he began work with the Foreign Office as a Grade 5 Officer on 7 August 1964, later be promoted to Grade 9 Officer. In 1965, he became the Assistant Private Secretary to the Chancellory of the Duchy of Lancaster. From 1967 to 1970, he was posted to Yaoundé, Cameroon, and later Rio de Janeiro, Brazil in 1971. Transferred to the Foreign and Commonwealth Office (FCO) as their Private Secretary to the Minister of State in 1975, and Head of Chancery in Lisbon in 1977.

In 1980, he became the Deputy Head of News of State, and Deputy Head of the Falkland Islands Department in 1982. By 1984, he was an Overseas Inspector. On 27 October 1986, he gave his credential to Sultan Hassanal Bolkiah at the Istana Nurul Iman, therefore replacing Francis Cornish as the new high commissioner. He would hold that position until 1991, where he was reappointed as the Ambassador to Zaire. From 1992 to 1995, he was appointed as the high commissioner to Tanzania.

== Honours ==
- Order of St Michael and St George Companion (CMG; 1990)

Diplomatic posts
Preceded by Thorold Masefield	British High Commissioner to Tanzania; 1992–1995	Succeeded by Alan Montgomery
Preceded by Robert Cormack	British Ambassador to Zaire; 1991–1992	Succeeded by Marcus Hope
Preceded by Francis Cornish	British High Commissioner to Brunei; 1986–1991	Succeeded by Adrian Sindall
