= Harold Smedley =

British diplomat

Sir Harold Smedley KCMG, MBE (19 June 1920 – 16 February 2004) was a British diplomat who was envoy to several countries.

== Career ==
Harold Smedley was educated at Aldenham School and Pembroke College, Cambridge. During the Second World War, he was in the Royal Marines and an officer in 48 Commando at the Normandy landings in 1944. In 1946, he entered the Dominions Office (which became the Commonwealth Relations Office in the following year). He was private secretary to the permanent under-secretary (1947–48), in the British high commissioner's office in Wellington, New Zealand (1948–50) and Salisbury, Southern Rhodesia (1951–53), principal private secretary to the secretary of state for Commonwealth relations (1954–57) and counsellor in the high commissioner's offices at Calcutta (1957) and New Delhi (1958–60).

Smedley was high commissioner in Ghana 1964–67 (with a break from December 1965 to March 1966 when the Ghanaian president, Kwame Nkrumah, broke off diplomatic relations over Rhodesia). He was ambassador to Laos (1968–70) assistant under-secretary]] at the Foreign and Commonwealth Office (1970–72), secretary-general to Lord Pearce's Commission on Rhodesian Opinion (of a proposed settlement) 1971–72, high commissioner in Sri Lanka and non-resident ambassador to the Maldives (1973–75), high commissioner in New Zealand and concurrently governor of the Pitcairn Islands (1976–80), and also non-resident high commissioner in Western Samoa (1977–80).

After retiring from the Diplomatic Service, Smedley was chairman of the London board of Bank of New Zealand (1983–89) and a member of West Sussex County Council (1989–93). He was president of the Hakluyt Society (1987–92).

Smedley was appointed a Member of the Order of the British Empire in the New Year Honours of 1946 for his wartime service, Companion of the Order of St Michael and St George in the New Year Honours of 1965 and knighted as a Knight Commander of the Order of St Michael and St George in the New Year Honours of 1978. He was made a serving brother of the Order of St John in 1963.

== Family ==
During his first posting to Wellington, New Zealand, Smedley met and married Beryl Harley Brown. As Beryl Smedley she wrote Partners in Diplomacy: The Changing Face of the Diplomat's Wife (Harley Press, 1990, ISBN 0951646206). She died in 2011.

Diplomatic posts
Preceded by Sir Geoffrey de Freitas	High Commissioner to Ghana; 1964–1967	Succeeded by Keith Matthews
Preceded by Sir Frederick Warner	Ambassador Extraordinary and Plenipotentiary at Vientiane; 1968–1970	Succeeded by John Lloyd
Preceded by Sir Angus MacKintosh	High Commissioner to Sri Lanka; 1973–1975	Succeeded by David Aiers
Preceded by Sir Angus MacKintosh	(Non-resident) Ambassador Extraordinary and Plenipotentiary to the Republic of Maldives; 1973–1975	Succeeded by David Aiers
Preceded by Sir David Scott	High Commissioner to New Zealand; 1976–1980	Succeeded by Sir Richard Stratton
Preceded by Sir David Scott	(Non-resident) Governor of the Pitcairn Islands; 1976–1980	Succeeded by Sir Richard Stratton
Preceded by Sir David Scott	(Non-resident) High Commissioner to Western Samoa; 1977–1980	Succeeded by Sir Richard Stratton
