= Victoria Treadell =

British diplomat (born 1959)

Her Excellency Victoria Treadell CMG MVO
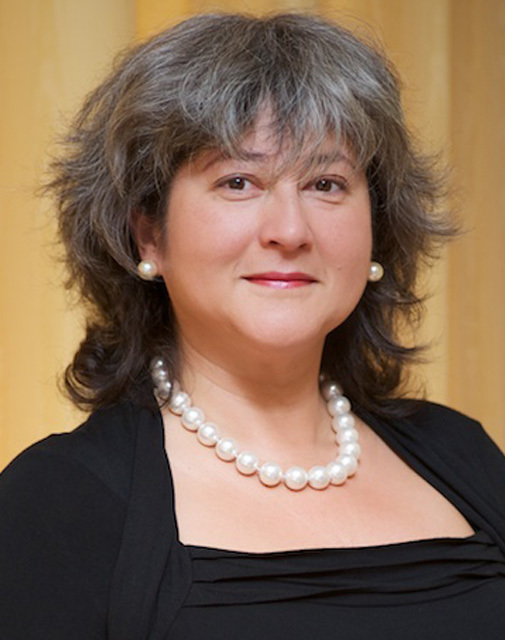

British High Commissioner to Australia
- In office March 2019 – April 2025
- Monarchs: Elizabeth II; Charles III
- Prime Minister: Theresa May; Boris Johnson; Liz Truss; Rishi Sunak; Keir Starmer
- Preceded by: Menna Rawlings
- Succeeded by: Sarah MacIntosh

British High Commissioner to Malaysia
- In office October 2014 – March 2019
- Monarch: Elizabeth II
- Prime Minister: David Cameron; Theresa May
- Preceded by: Simon Featherstone
- Succeeded by: Charles Hay

Governor of Pitcairn
- In office 3 June 2010 – July 2014
- Monarch: Elizabeth II
- Prime Minister: David Cameron
- Preceded by: George Fergusson
- Succeeded by: Jonathan Sinclair

British High Commissioner to New Zealand and Samoa
- In office May 2010 – March 2014
- Monarch: Elizabeth II
- Prime Minister: David Cameron
- Preceded by: George Fergusson
- Succeeded by: Jonathan Sinclair

Personal details
- Born: Victoria Marguerite Jansz; 4 November 1959 (age 66) Ipoh, Perak, Federation of Malaya
- Spouse: Alan Treadell
- Occupation: Diplomat

Victoria Marguerite Treadell, CMG, MVO (née Jansz; born 4 November 1959) is the former High Commissioner of the United Kingdom to Australia having also previously served as High Commissioner of the United Kingdom to Malaysia, High Commissioner of the United Kingdom to New Zealand and Samoa, and Governor of the Pitcairn Islands.

== Early life and education ==
She was born on 4 November 1959 in Ipoh, Perak, Malaya (now Malaysia) to a Cantonese mother and a father of French-Dutch ancestry.

== Diplomatic career ==
Treadell joined the Foreign and Commonwealth Office in 1978. Before her posting to New Zealand, she had held postings in Pakistan, India and Malaysia.

From 2010 to 2014, she served as High Commissioner to New Zealand and Governor of Pitcairn. She is the first woman who served as British High Commissioner to New Zealand. From October 2014 to 2019, she served as High Commissioner to Malaysia.

On 12 February 2019, Treadell was announced as the next British High Commissioner to Australia, in succession to Menna Rawlings, taking up the post in March 2019.

In early February 2020, Treadell took the "unprecedented" step of giving two elected officials from the Parliament of Australia a "dressing down". The letter, showed "stern" disapproval for how Australia had revealed its security concerns over the UK's invitation to Huawei into its 5G network, which had been expressed both to her, and her Foreign Secretary Dominic Raab, in a private briefing.

In 2021, she was branded as a "sanctimonious bore" by senior members of the Australian government over "publicly lecturing" Australia on its allegedly inadequate efforts to combat climate change.

== Personal life ==
In 1985, the then Victoria Jansz married Alan Treadell.

In addition, due to her interest in culture and arts, she has been one of the patrons of the Singapore-based British Theatre Playhouse since 2014, with regard to the plays that are produced in Malaysia.

== Honours ==
She was appointed a Member of the Royal Victorian Order (MVO) in 1989 following a visit by Elizabeth II to Malaysia. In the 2010 Queen's Birthday Honours, she was made a Companion of the Order of St Michael and St George (CMG).

Diplomatic posts
Preceded by George Fergusson	British High Commissioner to New Zealand; 2010–2014	Succeeded by Jonathan Sinclair
Preceded by George Fergusson	Governor of the Pitcairn, Henderson, Ducie and Oeno Islands; 2010–2014	Succeeded by Jonathan Sinclair
Preceded by Simon Featherstone	British High Commissioner to Malaysia; 2014–2019	Succeeded by Charles Hay
Preceded by Menna Rawlings	British High Commissioner to Australia; 2019–present	Incumbent
