= Robin Byatt =

British diplomat (1930–2019)

Robin Byatt CMG

British High Commissioner to Zimbabwe
- In office 1980–1983
- Monarch: Elizabeth II
- Prime Minister: Margaret Thatcher
- Succeeded by: Martin Ewans

British Ambassador to Morocco
- In office 1985–1987
- Monarch: Elizabeth II
- Prime Minister: Margaret Thatcher
- Preceded by: Sydney Cambridge
- Succeeded by: John Shakespeare

British High Commissioner to New Zealand
- In office 1987–1990
- Monarch: Elizabeth II
- Prime Minister: Margaret Thatcher
- Preceded by: Terence O'Leary
- Succeeded by: David Moss

Governor of the Pitcairn Islands
- In office December 1987 – 1990
- Monarch: Elizabeth II
- Preceded by: Terence O'Leary
- Succeeded by: David Moss

Personal details
- Born: 14 November 1930
- Died: 30 November 2019 (aged 89)
- Parents: Horace Byatt (father); Olga Margaret Campbell (mother)
- Education: University of Oxford (New College)
- Occupation: Diplomat

Ronald "Robin" Archer Campbell Byatt CMG (14 November 1930 – 30 November 2019) was a British diplomat, who served as British High Commissioner to New Zealand, and Zimbabwe and Ambassador to Morocco. He was also the Governor of Pitcairn. He was made a Companion of the Order of St Michael and St George in the 1980 Birthday Honours.
