= List of ambassadors of the United Kingdom to Oman =

His Majesty's Ambassador to Oman is the United Kingdom's foremost diplomatic representative in Oman, and is the head of Britain's diplomatic mission in Muscat.

Until 1971 the British representative in Muscat was a consul-general. Following the accession of Sultan Qaboos in 1970, the Sultan agreed that the consulate-general should be raised to an embassy, and the first British ambassador (and the first ambassador of any country) to the Sultanate, Donald Hawley, presented his credentials to the Sultan on 22 July 1971.

In June 2023, Dr. Liane Saunders OBE became the first female UK ambassador to hold that post following the retirement of William Murray.

== British ambassadors to Oman ==
- 1971–1974: Donald Hawley
- 1975–1979: James Treadwell
- 1979–1981: Ivor Lucas
- 1981–1986: Duncan Slater
- 1986–1990: Robert Alston
- 1990–1994: Sir Terence Clark
- 1994–1999: Sir Richard Muir
- 1999–2002: Sir Ivan Callan
- 2002–2005: Stuart Laing
- 2005–2011: Dr Noel Guckian
- 2011–2014: Jamie Bowden
- 2014–2017: Jonathan Wilks
- 2017–2021: Hamish Cowell
- 2021–2022: William Murray
- 2023–present: Dr Liane Saunders
