= Charles Hay (diplomat) =

British diplomat (born 1965)

His Excellency Charles Hay MVO
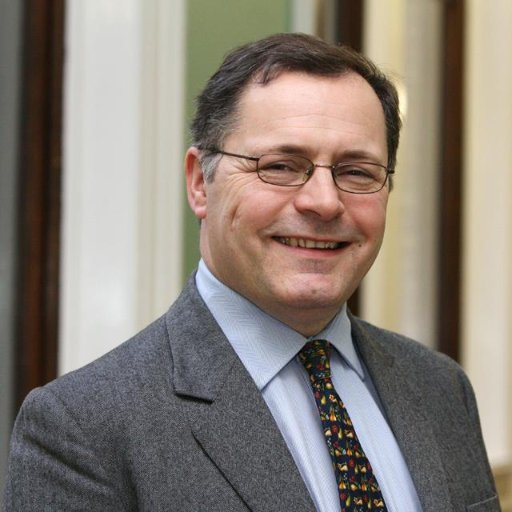

High Commissioner of the United Kingdom to Malaysia
- In office April 2019 – August 2023
- Monarchs: Elizabeth II; Charles III
- Prime Minister: Theresa May; Boris Johnson; Liz Truss; Rishi Sunak
- Preceded by: Victoria Treadell
- Succeeded by: Ailsa Terry

British Ambassador to South Korea
- In office February 2015 – March 2018
- Monarch: Elizabeth II
- Prime Minister: David Cameron; Theresa May
- Preceded by: Scott Wightman
- Succeeded by: Simon Smith

Personal details
- Born: Charles Hay
- Spouse: Pascale Sutherland
- Occupation: Diplomat

Military service
- Allegiance: United Kingdom
- Branch/service: British Army
- Years of service: 1987–1993
- Rank: Captain

Charles John Hay, MVO (born 22 September 1965) is a former High Commissioner of the United Kingdom to Malaysia, having been appointed in April 2019. He is the former British Ambassador to South Korea.

== Diplomatic career ==
Hay joined the Foreign and Commonwealth Office in 1993.

From 2015 to 2018, he served as British Ambassador to South Korea.

On 8 November 2018, Hay was announced as the next High Commissioner of the United Kingdom to Malaysia, in succession to Victoria Treadell. He took up the post in April 2019 until August 2023.

Diplomatic posts
Preceded by Scott Wightman	British Ambassador to South Korea; 2015–2018	Succeeded by Simon Smith
Preceded by Victoria Treadell	High Commissioner of the United Kingdom to Malaysia; 2019–present	Incumbent
