= List of high commissioners of the United Kingdom to Malaysia =

High Commissioner of the United Kingdom to Malaysia
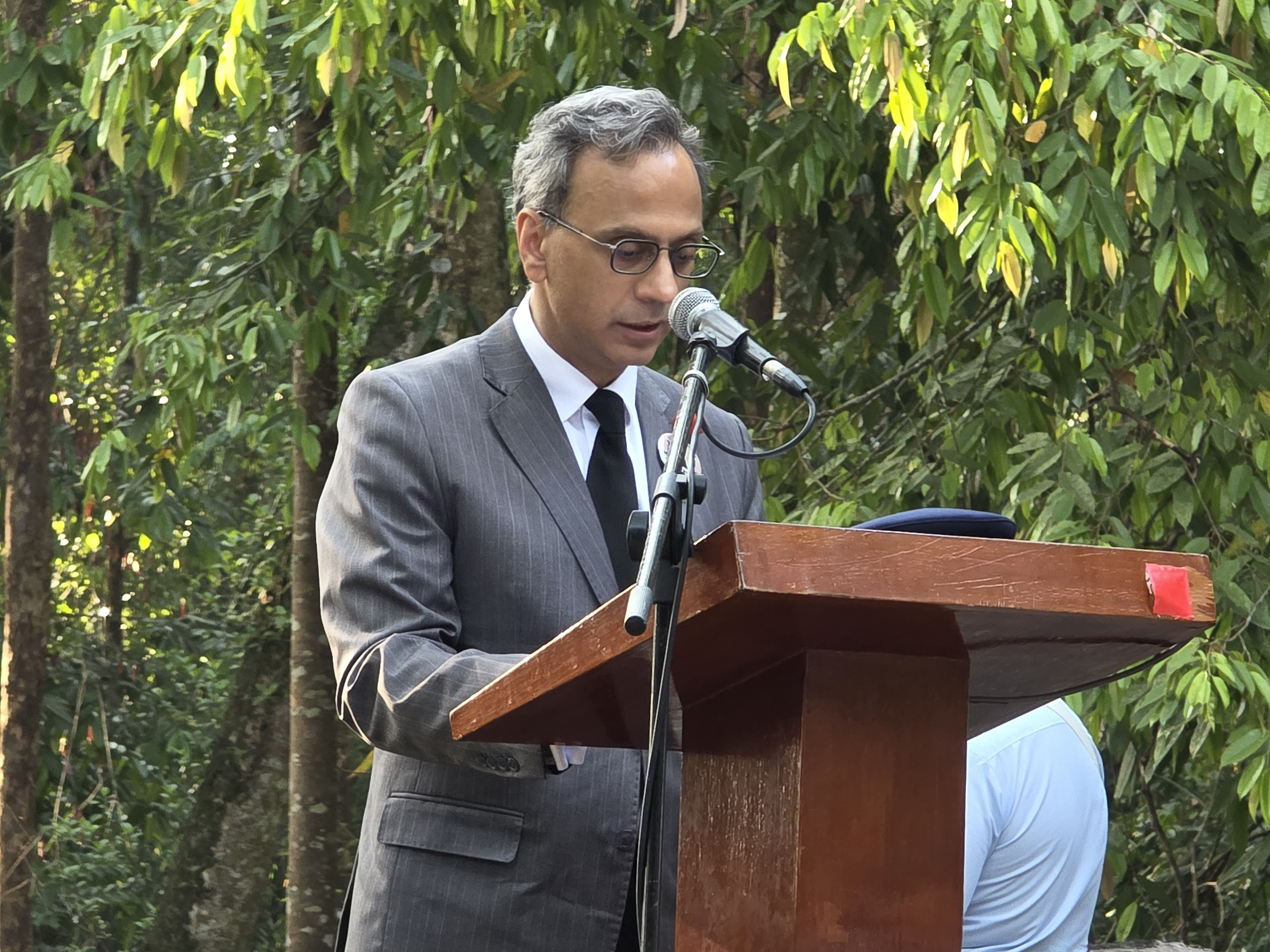
- Incumbent; Ajay Sharma since April 2025
- Style: His Excellency
- Seat: Kuala Lumpur, Malaysia
- Inaugural holder: Antony Head, 1st Viscount Head
- Formation: 1963
- Website: www.gov.uk/world/organisations/british-high-commission-kuala-lumpur

The high commissioner of the United Kingdom of Great Britain and Northern Ireland to Malaysia is the head of United Kingdom's diplomatic mission to Malaysia. The position has the rank and status of an ambassador extraordinary and plenipotentiary and is based in the high commission of the United Kingdom, Kuala Lumpur.

Prior to its separation and independence from the British Empire in 1957, Malaya was ruled by governors also termed "high commissioners".

== List of heads of mission ==
=== High commissioner to Malaya ===
- 1957–1963: Sir Geofroy Tory KCMG

=== High commissioners to Malaysia ===
- 1963–1966: Antony Head, 1st Viscount Head GCMG CBE MC
- 1966–1971: Sir Michael Walker GCMG
- 1971–1974: Sir John Johnston GCMG KCVO
- 1974–1977: Sir Eric Norris KCMG
- 1977–1981: Sir Donald Hawley KCMG MBE
- 1981–1983: Sir William Bentley KCMG
- 1983–1986: Lord Gillmore GCMG
- 1986–1992: Sir Nicholas Spreckley CMG
- 1992–1994: Duncan Slater CMG
- 1994–1998: Sir David Moss KCVO CMG
- 1998–2001: Sir Graham Fry KCMG
- 2001–2006: Bruce Cleghorn CMG
- 2006–2010: Boyd McCleary CMG CVO
- 2010–2014: Simon Featherstone CMG
- 2014-2019: Victoria Treadell CMG MVO
- 2019–2023: Charles Hay MVO
- 2023–2024:Ailsa Terry CMG
- 2024–2025: David Williams (Charge d’Affaires)
- 2025–present: Ajay Sharma

== See also ==
- Malaysia–United Kingdom relations
