= Stephen Gomersall =

British diplomat

Sir Stephen Gomersall KCMG

British Ambassador to Japan
- In office 1999–2004
- Monarch: Elizabeth II
- Prime Minister: Tony Blair
- Preceded by: Sir David Wright
- Succeeded by: Sir Graham Fry

Personal details
- Education: Forest School, Walthamstow
- Alma mater: Queens' College, Cambridge

Sir Stephen Gomersall KCMG is a British diplomat and businessman.

He was educated at Forest School, Snaresbrook and Queens' College, Cambridge. After 14 years serving as a diplomat in Japan and as British ambassador, 1999–2004, he became Chief Executive of Hitachi Europe Ltd. at the age of 56. His previous roles have included Director of International Security at the Foreign and Commonwealth Office, Ambassador and Deputy Permanent Representative of the UK Mission to the United Nations and Head of Security Policy Department, FCO. He now works as Chief Executive (Europe) for Hitachi Global.

On 29 April 2015, The Government of Japan bestowed the Grand Cordon of the Order of the Rising Sun, upon Sir Stephen John Gomersall, KCMG.

== See also ==
- Heads of the United Kingdom Mission in Japan
- Anglo-Japanese relations

Diplomatic posts
Preceded by Sir David Wright	British Ambassador to Japan; 1999–2004	Succeeded by Sir Graham Fry
