= James Turpin (diplomat) =

British diplomat (1917–2006)

James Alexander Turpin CMG

British Ambassador to the Philippines
- In office 1972–1976
- Preceded by: John Curle
- Succeeded by: William Bentley

Personal details
- Born: 7 January 1917
- Died: 3 October 2006 (aged 89)
- Children: 1
- Education: Trinity College Dublin
- Occupation: Diplomat

James Alexander Turpin (7 January 1917 – 3 October 2006) was a British diplomat who served as Ambassador to the Philippines from 1972 to 1976.

== Early life and education ==
Turpin was born on 7 January 1917 in Dublin, United Kingdom of Great Britain and Ireland. He was the son of Samuel Alexander Turpin. He was educated at The King's Hospital, Dublin and Trinity College Dublin where he was a Gold Medal winner.

== Career ==
Turpin became a lecturer at Trinity College after graduating there. During World War II, he joined the Royal Irish Fusiliers and served from 1942 to 1946. After the War, he joined the Foreign Service and his first posting was to Paris. He was then dispatched to the Embassy in Warsaw in 1950 and to the Embassy in Tokyo in 1955. From 1960 to 1963, he was seconded to the Board of Trade, and then sent to the Embassy in The Hague as commercial Counsellor remaining in the post until 1967 when he was transferred to New Delhi as Minister (Economic and Commercial). From 1971 to 1972, he was Under-Secretary for Foreign and Commonwealth Affairs (Economic and Commercial) at the Foreign and Commonwealth Office.

Turpin was appointed Ambassador to the Philippines in 1972 and served in the post until 1976. This was during Ferdinand Marcos's imposition of martial law and his establishment of an authoritarian regime. Turpin maintained a good relationship with Marcos and the members of his regime, and supported Marcos's measures to quell unrest and implement social and economic change. According to The Times, "Turpin considered that his introduction of martial law was a correct and courageous solution to the problems of insurgency and civil unrest his country faced at the time."

He retired from the Diplomatic Service in 1977 and became a consultant advising British companies on how to do business in foreign countries.

== Personal life and death ==
Turpin married Kathleen Eadie in 1942 and they had a daughter. Turpin was chairman of the British-Philippine Society from 1986 to 1988.

Turpin died on 3 October 2006, aged 89.

== Publications ==
- New Society's Challenge in the Philippines (1980)
- The Philippines: Problems of the Ageing New Society (1984)

== Honours ==
Turpin was appointed Companion of the Order of St Michael and St George (CMG) in the 1966 New Year Honours.

Diplomatic posts
Preceded by John Curle	British Ambassador to the Philippines; 1972–1976	Succeeded by William Bentley
