= David Aubrey Scott =

British diplomat

Sir David Aubrey Scott GCMG (3 August 1919 – 27 December 2010) was a British diplomat who served as High Commissioner to New Zealand and Ambassador to South Africa.

== Early life ==
Scott was the elder son of Hugh Sumner Scott who was a schoolmaster at Wellington College, and his wife, Barbara Easton Jackson, who was a J.P. and county councillor, becoming Chairman of the Berkshire County Council Education Committee. Scott was educated at Charterhouse School and at the University of Birmingham where he studied mining engineering. During World War II he served in the Royal Artillery. From 1945 to 1947, he was chief radar adviser in the British Military Mission to the Egyptian Army.

== Diplomatic career ==
Scott joined the Commonwealth Relations Office in 1948 where he was assistant private secretary to the Secretary of State in 1949. From 1951 to 1953, he was at Cape Town and Pretoria and then worked in the Cabinet Office from 1954 to 1956. In 1955 Scott was on the Malta Round Table Conference, and was Secretary-General of the Caribbean and Malaya Constitutional Conference in 1956. He served in Singapore from 1956 to 1958 and was on the Monckton Commission on Central Africa in 1960. From 1961 to 1963, he was Deputy High Commissioner to the Federation of Rhodesia and Nyasaland and in 1964 was at the Imperial Defence College. His next post was Deputy High Commissioner in India from 1965 to 1967 and he was awarded CMG in 1966.

From 1967 to 1970, Scott was British High Commissioner in Uganda and non-residential Ambassador to Rwanda. He was Assistant Under Secretary of State at the Foreign and Commonwealth Office from 1970 to 1972 and was High Commissioner to New Zealand and Governor of the Pitcairn Islands from 1973 to 1975 and was awarded KCMG in 1974. He was appointed British Ambassador to South Africa from 1976 to 1979 when he retired and was awarded GCMG.

== Later interests ==
After his retirement, Scott became director of several companies including Barclays Bank International from 1979 to 1985, Mitchell Cotts Plc from 1980 to 1986, Delta Metals Overseas from 1980 to 1983, and Bradbury Williams Plc from 1984 to 1986. He was chairman of Ellerman Lines from 1982 to 1983 and of Nuclear Resources Ltd from 1984 to 1988. He was also a consultant to Thomas de la Rue & Co from 1986 to 1988. Scott was also Vice President of the UK South Africa Trade Association from 1980 to 1985.

Scott published Ambassador in Black and White in 1981 and Window into Downing Street in 2003. He became a Freeman of the City of London in 1982 and liveryman of the Worshipful Company of Shipwrights in 1983. He became president of the Uganda Society for Disabled Children in 1984 and was Governor of the Sadlers Wells Trust from 1984 to 1989. In 1989 he was a member of the Manchester 1996 Olympic bid committee. In retirement, he was first Vice-Chairman then Chairman and finally (from 1998) President of the Royal Over-Seas League.

== Family ==
In 1941, Scott married Vera Ibbitson, daughter of Maj. G. H. Ibbitson, and had three children:

- Sir Robert David Hillyer Scott (born 1944), businessman
- Diana Susan Scott, Lady Unwin (born 1942), married Sir Brian Unwin
- Andrew Scott (born 1953) is a schoolteacher and choral conductor.

Vera died on 2 October 2010, two months before her husband of 69 years, who died on 27 December 2010.

Diplomatic posts
Preceded by Sir Arthur Galsworthy	High Commissioner to New Zealand; 1973–1975	Succeeded by Harold Smedley
Preceded by Sir James Bottomley	British Ambassador to South Africa; 1976–1979	Succeeded by Sir John Leahy
