= Stuart Laing (diplomat) =

British diplomat

16th British Ambassador to Kuwait
- In office 2005–2008
- Monarch: Elizabeth II
- Prime Minister: Tony Blair; Gordon Brown
- Preceded by: Chris Wilton
- Succeeded by: Michael Aron

9th British Ambassador to Oman
- In office 2002–2005
- Preceded by: Ivan Callan
- Succeeded by: Noel Guckian

13th British High Commissioner to Brunei
- In office 1998–2002
- Preceded by: Ivan Callan
- Succeeded by: Andrew Caie

Personal details
- Born: 22 July 1948 (age 77)
- Occupation: Diplomat

Stuart Laing (born 22 July 1948) is a British former diplomat and was Master of Corpus Christi College, Cambridge from 2008 to 2018.

== Career as diplomat ==
Laing entered the diplomatic service in 1970. During his service in the Diplomatic Service, Laing held the following offices:

- Deputy Ambassador to the Czech Republic—1989–1992
- Deputy Ambassador to Saudi Arabia—1992–1995
- High Commissioner to Brunei—1998–2002
- Ambassador to Oman—2002–2005
- Ambassador to Kuwait—2005–2008

== Academic career ==
Laing graduated from Corpus Christi College, Cambridge in 1970 having studied Classics. He was appointed Master of his old college Corpus Christi on 1 October 2008 succeeding Oliver Rackham, and retired from that position in August 2018. He researches and writes on Arab and East African history and in 2012 he published, jointly with Robert Alston, Unshook till the end of time, a book on the history of Britain's relationship with Oman. The degree of M.Phil. was conferred to him in 2013 for a thesis on the ending of the slave trade in the Indian Ocean. In 2017 he published a biography of the ivory trader Tippu Tip (Hamed bin Mohammed al-Murjabi).

== Personal life ==
Laing is a keen amateur musician; he plays keyboard instruments and the oboe. His other recreations are desert travel and hill-walking. Laing is married to Sibella (daughter of Sir Maurice Henry Dorman, herself a graduate in History of Newnham College, Cambridge) and has a son and two daughters.

Diplomatic posts
Preceded by Sir Ivan Callan	British High Commissioner to Brunei; 1998–2002	Succeeded by Andrew Caie
Preceded by Sir Ivan Callan	British Ambassador to Oman; 2002–2005	Succeeded by Noel Guckian
Preceded by Chris Wilton	British Ambassador to Kuwait; 2005–2008	Succeeded by Michael Aron
Academic offices
Preceded by Oliver Rackham	Master of Corpus Christi College, Cambridge; 2008–2018	Succeeded by Christopher Kelly
