= Robert Alston =

British diplomat

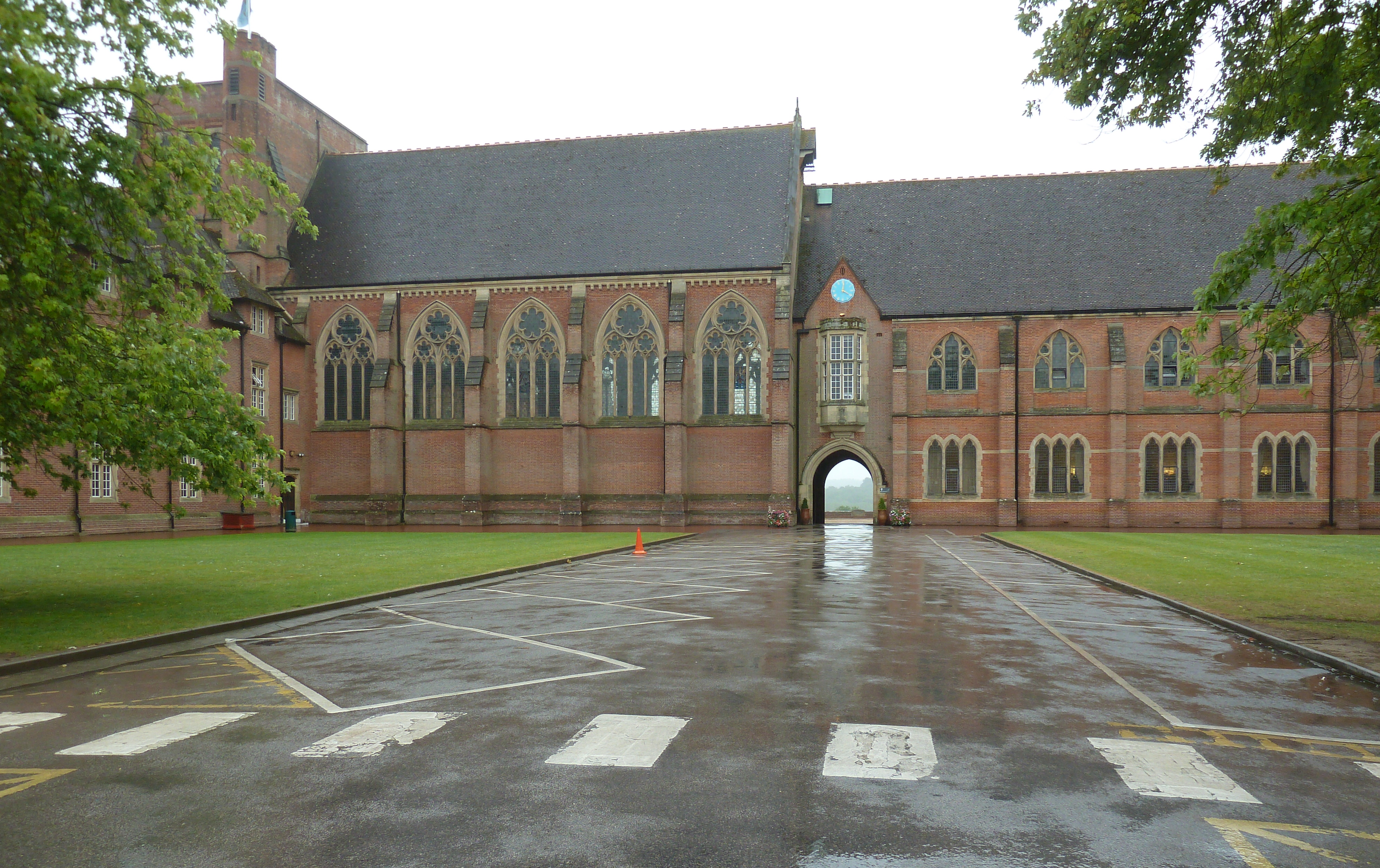
Ardingly College

Robert John Alston, CMG QSO DL (born 10 February 1938) is a retired British diplomat.

Alston was educated at Ardingly College and New College, Oxford. He served as British Ambassador to Oman between (1986–1990), and as British High Commissioner to New Zealand and the Cook Islands, non-resident High Commissioner to Samoa, and Governor of the Pitcairn Islands between (1994–1998).

In 1987, Alston became a Companion of the Order of St Michael and St George. From 2007 to 2008, he was Master of the Worshipful Company of World Traders, one of the City of London's 110 livery companies. He was Chairman of Governors at Ardingly College.

Diplomatic posts
Preceded by Duncan Slater	British Ambassador to Oman; 1986–1990	Succeeded by Sir Terence Clark
Preceded by David Moss	British High Commissioner to New Zealand; 1994–1998	Succeeded by Martin Williams
