= Bob Scott (businessman) =

English businessman

Sir Robert David Hillyer Scott (born 22 January 1944) is an English businessman in South London who is noted for his involvement with the International Olympic Committee. Scott was Chairman of the Manchester Olympic Bid Committee's unsuccessful bids in 1996 and 2000, as well as the successful November 1995 bid to play host to the 2002 Commonwealth Games. Scott was knighted in 1994 New Year Honours.

== Early life and education ==
Scott was born in Minehead, Somerset, the eldest son of diplomat David Aubrey Scott GCMG and Vera Kathleen Ibbitson. He has a younger brother, Andrew, and a sister, Diana, married to Brian Unwin. Timothy Frank Siward Scott OBE was his uncle. He attended Haileybury and Imperial Service College and Merton College, Oxford. He read Classics and Law at Oxford and sat for a Pass degree, but left without being awarded a degree. He was heavily involved in student dramatics while at Oxford, acting with the Experimental Theatre Club and serving as President of OUDS.

== Business career ==
Scott became Administrator of the 69 Theatre Company in Manchester in 1968. He later became Administrator of the Royal Exchange Theatre Trust. As Managing Director of Manchester Theatres he revived two major theatres in the city – the Palace (1981) and Opera House (1984). He spent almost forty years as the chair of the Granada Foundation, stepping down in December 2023.

== Public service ==
In 2008, Scott was appointed Chairman of the European Commission jury to select the European Capital of Culture. He was Chairman of Trinity Laban (from 2005-2012), Greenwich Theatre and South London Business. In June 2003, he led Liverpool’s successful bid to become the European Capital of Culture in 2008, and then was appointed the International Ambassador of the Liverpool Culture Company.

He founded Cornerhouse, Manchester. He has been a Governor of the Royal Northern College of Music, a Director of the Buxton Festival, the Halle Orchestra and the Whitworth Art Gallery. He was a Board Member of the Central Manchester Development Corporation from 1988 to 1996.

== Recognition ==
Scott was made a Knight Bachelor in the 1994 New Year Honours, for services to sport and to the community in Manchester.

He has received honorary degrees from Manchester University in 1988 and from Salford University in 1991. He was made an Honorary Fellow of Manchester Polytechnic (1987), UMIST (1988), the Royal Northern College of Music (1990), and received an honorary doctorate by the University of Greenwich (2003) and an Honorary Fellowship by Liverpool John Moores University (2003). He was a deputy lieutenant of the County of Greater Manchester from 1988 to 1997.

On 16 July 2010, Sir Bob received his honorary doctorate in arts from Leeds Metropolitan University's Carnegie Faculty of Sport and Education.

== Personal life ==
Scott has been married twice. In 1972, he married Su Dalgleish, and had two sons and a daughter before divorcing in 1995. He married secondly to Alicia Tomalino in 1995, and has a further two stepchildren.
