= Patrick Duff (civil servant) =

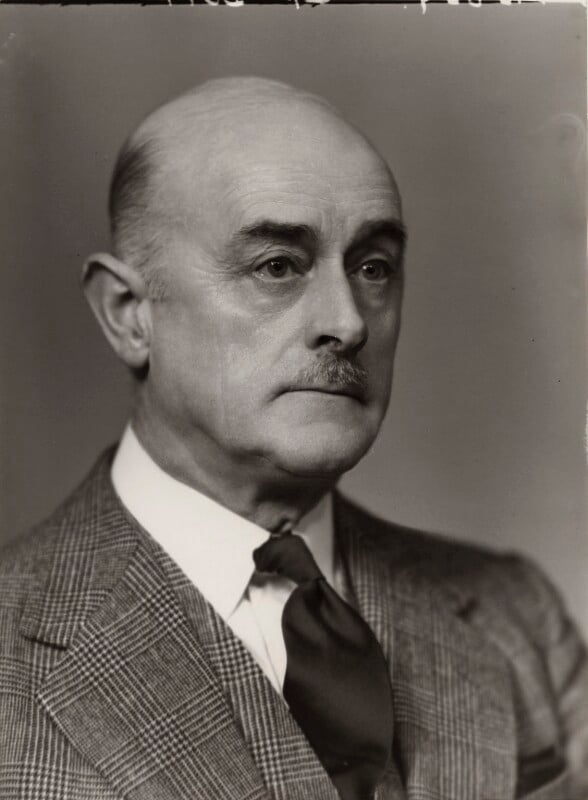
Duff in 1953

Sir Charles Patrick Duff, KCB, KCVO (1889 – 16 December 1972) was a British civil servant who served as private secretary to successive prime ministers, including three years as principal private secretary to Ramsay MacDonald.

Educated at Blundell's School and Balliol College, Oxford, Duff joined the Home Civil Service, entering their Board of Trade in 1912. He served in the British Army during the First World War, during which he saw service in the Gallipoli campaign, as well as in France and in Mesopotamia. He was wounded and twice mentioned in despatches. After serving as private secretary to successive Presidents of the Board of Trade from 1919 to 1923, he served as private secretary to prime ministers Stanley Baldwin and Ramsay MacDonald from 1923 to 1933, becoming Principal Private Secretary from 1930 to 1933.

Duff then became Permanent Under-Secretary of State at the Ministry of Works and Public Buildings from 1933 to 1941. He was Deputy High Commissioner to Canada from 1941 to 1933, and British High Commissioner to New Zealand from 1945 to 1949. From 1949 to 1954, he was a Church Commissioner for England, Chairman of the National Parks Commission, and member of the Nature Conservancy.

Duff was appointed a Compmander of the Royal Victorian Order (CVO) in 1924, a Companion of the Order of the Bath (CB) in the 1928 Birthday Honours, promoted to Knight Commander of the Bath (KCB) in the 1932 New Year Honours, and promoted to Knight Commander of the Royal Victorian Order (KCVO) in 1937.
