= Basil Eastwood =

Basil Stephen Talbot Eastwood CMG (born 4 March 1944) is a retired British diplomat.

== Early life ==
Eastwood was educated at Eton College (from 1957 until 1962) and Merton College, Oxford, where he studied history, and, later, Arabic.

== Career ==
Eastwood held posts in Saudi Arabia, Sri Lanka, Egypt, Germany, and Sudan, where he was posted as Head of Chancery in 1984. He was British Ambassador to the Syrian Arab Republic from 1996 to 2000 and to the Swiss Confederation from 2001 to 2004.

In July 1998, while serving in Syria, Eastwood announced a courtesy visit to Damascus by HMS Marlborough and the supply ship RFA Fort Victoria. In a lengthy statement carried by Reuters, he said he hoped this would be the beginning of programmes of military co-operation between Syria and the United Kingdom.

In 1998 Eastwood co-founded Cecily's Fund, a charity that helps Zambian orphans by funding their education. He is currently the chair of the charity's International Advisory Panel.

In November 1999, Eastwood arranged talks in Damascus between United States Secretary of State Madeleine Albright, US ambassador Ryan Crocker, Lord Levy, representing Tony Blair, and himself.

In 2004, Eastwood and Richard W. Murphy, a United States Assistant Secretary of State under the Reagan presidency, published a joint study which noted: "In the Arab Middle East, the awkward truth is that the most significant movements which enjoy popular support are those associated with political Islam". Their study called on the Western powers to seek to engage with moderate Islamists.

== Honours ==
- Companion of the Order of St Michael and St George, 1999

Diplomatic posts
Preceded by Adrian Sindall	British Ambassador to Syria; 1996–2000	Succeeded by Henry Hogger
Preceded by Christopher Hulse	British Ambassador to Switzerland; 2001–2004	Succeeded by Simon Featherstone
