= List of high commissioners of the United Kingdom to New Zealand =

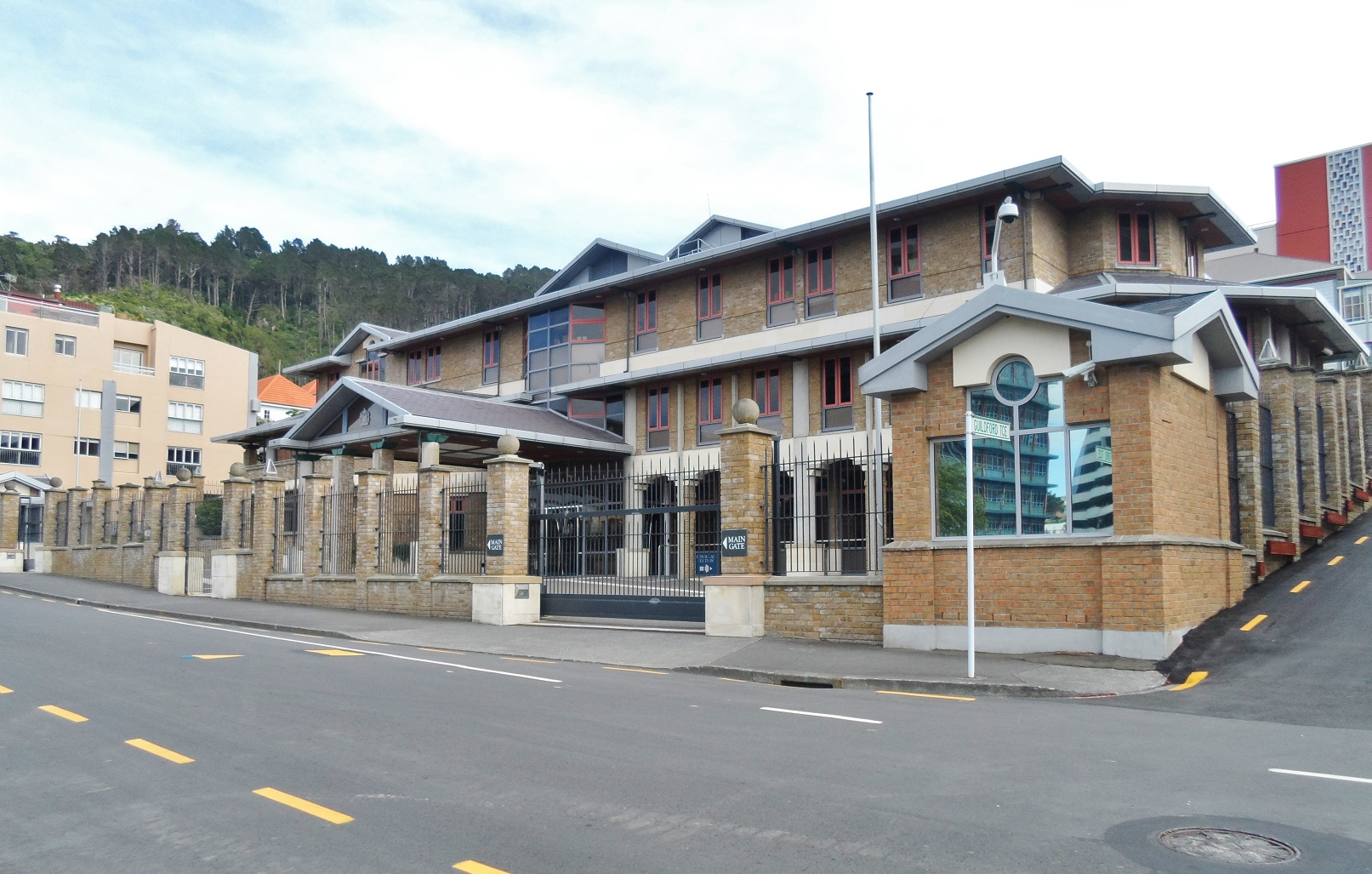
The British High Commission in Wellington

The high commissioner of the United Kingdom to New Zealand is the United Kingdom's foremost diplomatic representative in New Zealand, and head of the UK's diplomatic mission in New Zealand. As the United Kingdom and New Zealand are fellow members of the Commonwealth of Nations, their diplomatic relations are at governmental level, rather than between heads of state. Thus, the countries exchange high commissioners, rather than ambassadors. The current high commissioner as of 2026 is Louise Cantillon.

The British high commissioner to New Zealand is also the non-resident governor of the Pitcairn, Henderson, Ducie and Oeno Islands, a British Overseas Territory, and formerly non-resident high commissioner to the Independent State of Samoa. Besides the high commission in Wellington, the UK government maintains a consulate general in Auckland.

== List of high commissioners ==
The following persons have served as British high commissioner to New Zealand since 1939:

- 1939–1945: Sir Harry Batterbee
- 1945–1949: Sir Patrick Duff
- 1949–1953: Sir Roy Price
- 1953–1957: General Sir Geoffry Scoones
- 1957–1959: Sir George Mallaby
- 1959–1963: Sir Francis Cumming-Bruce
- 1964–1969: Sir Ian Maclennan
- 1969–1973: Sir Arthur Galsworthy
- 1973–1975: Sir David Aubrey Scott
- 1976–1980: Sir Harold Smedley
- 1980–1984: Sir Richard Stratton
- 1984–1987: Terence Daniel O'Leary
- 1987–1990: Robin Byatt
- 1990–1994: Sir David Moss
- 1994–1998: Robert Alston
- 1998–2001: Martin Williams
- 2001–2006: Richard Fell
- 2006–2010: George Fergusson
- 2010–2014: Victoria Treadell
- 2014–2017: Jonathan Sinclair
- 2018–2022: Laura Clarke
- 2022–2026: Iona Thomas
- 2026–present: Louise Cantillon

== See also ==
- List of high commissioners of New Zealand to the United Kingdom
