= Donald Hawley =

British colonial lawyer, diplomat and writer

Sir Donald Hawley KCMG MBE (22 May 1921 – 31 January 2008) was a British colonial lawyer, diplomat and writer.

== Career ==
Donald Frederick Hawley was educated at Radley College. At the outbreak of World War II, about to go to university, he volunteered for the Oxford and Bucks Light Infantry but was told to continue to university: he went to New College, Oxford where he took a four-term wartime degree in law.

In 1941, he joined the Royal Artillery "without Army pay and allowances whilst specially employed" because he was with Sudanese troops in North Africa. In 1944, he joined the Sudan Political Service, then the Sudan Judiciary in 1947.

In 1951, he was formally called to the bar in England. He continued as Chief Registrar of the Sudan Judiciary and Registrar-General of Marriages until 1955 when he resigned from the Sudan service and joined the British Diplomatic Service. After two years in the Foreign Office he was posted as Political Agent to the Trucial States, based in Dubai, 1958–62, then to Cairo 1962–65 and Lagos 1965–67.

He then took a sabbatical break as a fellow of Durham University, which was cut short due to the resumption of relations with Iraq after a break following the Six-Day War. Hawley was Counsellor (Commercial) at Baghdad (second to the ambassador) 1968–71, then the first British ambassador to Oman 1971–75, assistant Under-Secretary of State at the Foreign and Commonwealth Office 1975–77, and High Commissioner to Malaysia 1977–81. He then retired from the Diplomatic Service and continued as a consultant and other activities including founder membership of the Anglo-Omani Society and the British Malaysian Society, President of the Council of Reading University 1987–94 and chairman of the Royal Society for Asian Affairs 1994–2002.

== Honours ==
Hawley was appointed MBE in 1955, CMG in 1970, and knighted KCMG in 1978. He was awarded an honorary DLitt degree by Reading University and an honorary DCL by Durham University.

== Family ==
In 1964, Donald Hawley married Ruth Howes; the couple had a son and three daughters, one of whom is the journalist Caroline Hawley. In retirement Sir Donald and Lady Hawley lived at Little Cheverell, Wiltshire, and he wrote a history of the village.

Lady Hawley was appointed High Sheriff of Wiltshire for the year 1998 and was appointed a Deputy Lieutenant of Wiltshire in 1999.

== Publications ==
- Judges' robes in the Sudan, Faculty of Law, University of Khartoum, 1959
- Courtesies in the Trucial States, Khayats, Beirut, 1965
- The Trucial States, Allen & Unwin, London, 1970. ISBN 0049530054
- Oman and its renaissance, Stacey, London, 1977. ISBN 0950330485
- Manners and correct form in the Middle East, Debrett's Peerage, 1984. ISBN 0905649672
- Sandtracks in the Sudan, Michael Russell, 1995. ISBN 0859552101
- Courtesies in the Gulf area : a dictionary of colloquial phrase and usage, Stacey, London, 1998. ISBN 1900988038
- Sudan Canterbury tales, Michael Russell, 1999. ISBN 0859552454
- Desert wind and tropic storm : an autobiography, Michael Russell, 2000. ISBN 0859552586
- The Emirates : witness to a metamorphosis, Michael Russell, 2007. ISBN 9780859553056
- Little Cheverell : the history of a Wiltshire village, Michael Russell, 2007. ISBN 9780859553100

Diplomatic posts
New title	Ambassador Extraordinary and Plenipotentiary at Muscat; 1970–1974	Succeeded by Charles Treadwell
Preceded by Sir Eric Norris	High Commissioner to Malaysia; 1977–1981	Succeeded by Sir William Bentley
