= David Moss (diplomat) =

British diplomat (born 1938)

Sir David Joseph Moss, KCVO, CMG (born 6 November 1938) is a British retired diplomat.

== Career ==
Moss joined the civil service in 1956 and was appointed to HM Diplomatic Service in 1966. He served as first secretary at the British embassy in Bolivia from 1969 to 1970 and then, after three years at the Foreign and Commonwealth Office (FCO), he was appointed first secretary at the British embassy in the Netherlands in 1974. He returned to the FCO in 1978 and was promoted to the rank of counsellor the following year. He was posted as Deputy Permanent Representative to the United Kingdom's mission to the United Nations Office at Geneva in 1983. He then returned to London as Assistant Under-Secretary of State at the FCO from 1987 until 1990, when he was appointed High Commissioner to New Zealand. He then served as High Commissioner to Malaysia from 1994 until his retirement in 1998.

Moss was appointed a Companion of the Order of St Michael and St George in the 1989 New Year Honours. He was appointed a Knight Commander of the Royal Victorian Order in September 1998.
