= British Koreans =

British people of Korean descent

재영 한인 jaeyeong han-in

Total population
- Ethnic Koreans: 21,118 (England and Wales only, 2021); Other estimates: 40,770 (2019)

Regions with significant populations
- Greater London and the South East

Languages
- British English, Korean

Religion
- majority Protestant Christian, minority Buddhist

British Koreans (Korean: 재영 한인) are people of Korean ethnic descent who reside in the United Kingdom. They include Korean-born migrants to the United Kingdom and their British-born descendants tracing ancestries from North Korea and South Korea.

== History ==
The United Kingdom was the first European country to establish diplomatic relations with South Korea in 18 January 1949. This opened the possibility for the first Korean migrants to the UK. Larger-scale migration only happened after the 1980s, when South Korean policies enabled its citizens to travel, study, and work overseas.

Comparatively, Germany during the 1960s and 1970s invited South Koreans to fill their labour shortage. Germany employed some 11,000 Korean nurses and nursing assistants and 8,000 miners during this time. However, with the economic development of South Korea in the 1990s, the United Kingdom became an increasingly attractive destination. South Korean companies established branches in the United Kingdom. Many South Koreans also moved to the United Kingdom for study or to establish small private businesses. In the first decade of the 2000s, the Koreans in the United Kingdom exceeded those in Germany.

Koreans in Europe
| | United Kingdom | Germany | France | Sweden |
|---|---|---|---|---|
| 1993 | 6,049 | 28,010 | 8,965 | 876 |
| 2001 | 15,000 | 30,492 | 10,485 | 1,070 |
| 2009 | 45,295 | 31,248 | 14,738 | 1,434 |
| 2011 | 46,829 | 31,518 | 12,684 | 2,050 |
| 2017 | 39,934 | 40,170 | 16,251 | 3,174 |
| 2021 | 36,690 | 47,428 | 25,417 | 13,055 |

Since the early 2000s, the United Kingdom has hosted the largest North Korean populations outside of East Asia. Many are secondary refugee migrants, first fleeing to South Korea before resettling in the United Kingdom, often in the New Malden region of London. The number of North Koreans claiming asylum in the UK peaked at 412 in 2007, having risen from only 45 in 2006. Numbers then dropped to 185 in 2008, and ranged between 20 and 37 per annum between 2009 and 2014. According to UNHCR statistics, 622 recognised refugees and 59 asylum seekers from North Korea were present in the UK in 2014.

The UK grants asylum only to defectors who come directly from North Korea. In 2008, it was reported that 180 asylum seekers had had their applications rejected after police checks revealed that they had previously resided in South Korea (and thus had residency rights and citizenship there, in accordance with the South Korean constitution). Some of the alleged North Korean defectors may also be ethnic Koreans from China who purchased North Korean documents so that they could attempt to gain refugee status in developed countries. Efforts by UK Visas and Immigration and predecessors to identify fake defectors have not always been successful and have also been known to misclassify actual defectors as fake ones. In September 2014, an asylum tribunal dismissed the appeal of several North Koreans, ruling that the "appellants are South Korean citizens and their asylum appeal must fail".

== Demographics ==
=== Population size ===
The population of British Koreans is hard to assess. The census in the United Kingdom does not have a separate category for Korean ethnicity. Koreans are only able to record their ethnicity through selecting "Other Asian" and writing-in "Korean". This recorded a total of 21,118 ethnic Koreans across the country.

Some historic census estimates exist for those born in South Korea and North Korea, but these details are incomplete:

| Year | Country of birth | England | Wales | Scotland | Northern Ireland |
|---|---|---|---|---|---|
| 2001 | North Korea | ?? | | | |
| 2001 | South Korea | 12,310 | | | |
| 2011 | North Korea | 369 | 12 | 11 | ?? |
| 2011 | South Korea | 16,276 | 310 | 716 | 92 |
| 2021 | North Korea | 3,000 | ?? | ?? | ?? |
| 2021 | South Korea | 9,000 | ?? | 1,000 | 135 |

South Korea's Ministry of Foreign Affairs maintains its own records of Koreans overseas, regardless of whether or not they are current South Korean citizens, and regardless of birthplace. In 2011, it reported 45,295 Koreans registered as living in the UK. (Note: All South Korean citizens intending to reside overseas for more than 90 days are required by law to register with the South Korean consulate nearest their overseas residence. Failure to register can have negative consequences for taxes and real estate purchases, and overseas-born children who are not registered may have difficulty enrolling in South Korean schools. See 재외국민등록 [Registration of nationals overseas] (in Korean (South Korea)), South Korea: Ministry of Foreign Affairs and Trade, 2009) Among those recorded, 3,839 were British citizens, 9,170 had indefinite leave to remain, 19,000 were international students, and the other 14,820 had other kinds of visas. About two-thirds resided in the London area. In 2019, the Ministry of Foreign Affairs reported a drop in the number of Koreans living in the UK, to 40,770.

=== Population distribution ===
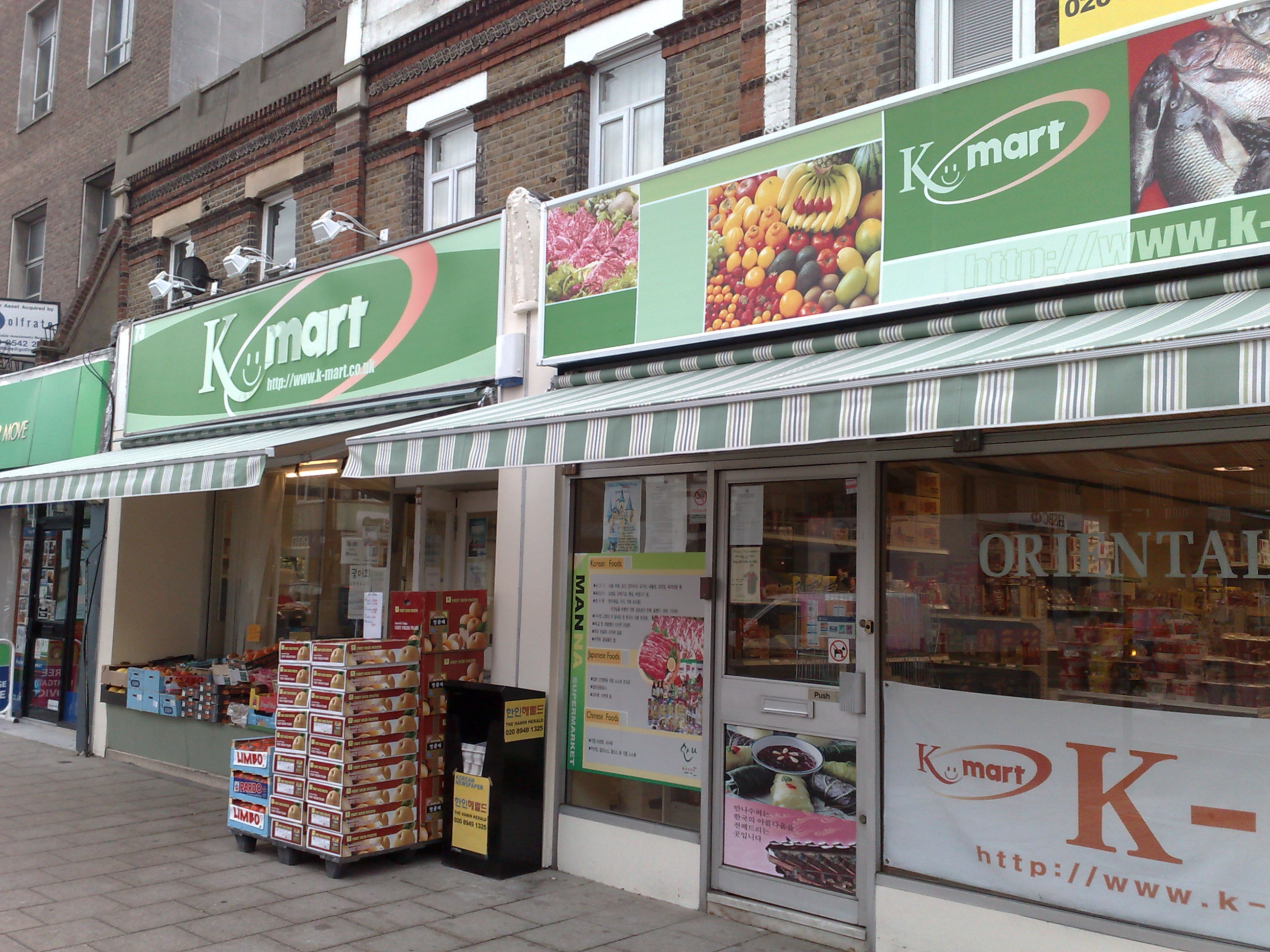
A Korean supermarket in New Malden, London

Large numbers of Koreans began to settle in the UK in the 1980s, mostly near London; the highest concentration can be found in the town of New Malden, where estimates of the British Korean population range from 8,000 to as high as 20,000 people. Factors which may have attracted them to New Malden include cheap housing, the previous presence of a Japanese community in the area, and the "bandwagon effect" of a few prominent Korean businesses in the area early on. In the 1990s, the area came to prominence as a hub for the Korean community; the high concentration of Koreans there meant that adult immigrants, especially women, tend not to speak much English, even after years of residence in the United Kingdom. During the 2002 FIFA World Cup, Koreans from all over the country flocked to the town to gather with their co-ethnics and show support for the Korea Republic national football team.

Other areas with a Korean presence include Golders Green, where Korean and Japanese immigrants have been visibly replacing the older, diminishing Jewish community.

Of the total of 392 North Korean-born residents recorded by the 2011 census, 251 lived in Greater London, 47 in North-West England and 30 in Yorkshire and the Humber.

=== Religion ===
The census in the United Kingdom does not have a separate category for Koreans and, hence, does not provide religious breakdown. However, as with Koreans in other contexts, Protestant churches have played an important social and cultural role in the Korean immigrant community in the United Kingdom. Korean immigrants have often participated in mainstream English-speaking churches in the United Kingdom. But some have also attended churches which are explicitly conducted in Korean language. Some Korean immigrant churches will also conduct youth group services and activities in English language; this has aided in preventing the attrition of Korean language abilities among locally born Korean youth. Denominations with Korean-language services in New Malden include the Church of England and the Methodist Church.

A smaller number of Koreans in the UK observe Buddhism.

== Business ==
21% of all Korean-owned businesses in the UK, are located in the New Malden area. The first Korean restaurant in New Malden was established in 1991. Other Korean businesses in the area include hairdressers, stationery shops, travel agents, and Korean-language child care services; there used to be a bookstore selling imported Korean novels, but it closed down. Two rival Korean-language newspapers are also published there. Korean grocers do good business, as Korean food products, unlike those from India or Japan, tend to be unavailable from mainstream retailers such as Tesco. While Korean food has not historically been as popular as Chinese food, and Korean restaurants in London have been described as "mostly student hang-outs, offering simple food at bargain prices", it is gaining popularity, particularly in the gourmet street food market.

A 2006 study of Korean businesses in Kingston upon Thames noted that Korean business owners' unfamiliarity with commercial practices in the UK, along with language barriers, have sometimes led them into conflict with governmental regulators; the Health and Safety Executive noted that Korean barbecue restaurants are especially problematic in this regard, as they often imported small, uncertified table-top gas cookers directly from South Korea for self-installation, rather than hiring a registered gas engineer to install and inspect them, and took no corrective action when issued with warnings. The language barrier is compounded by the lack of translators; one Korean translator estimated that she had only four or five competitors in the entire country. Today, most South Koreans speak English and many high-quality restaurants can be found in London's West End.

== Notable people ==
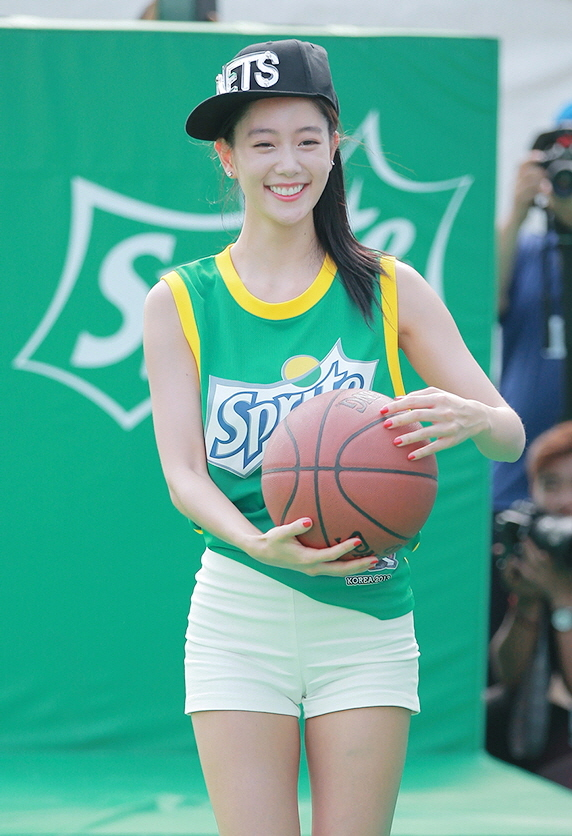
Clara Lee

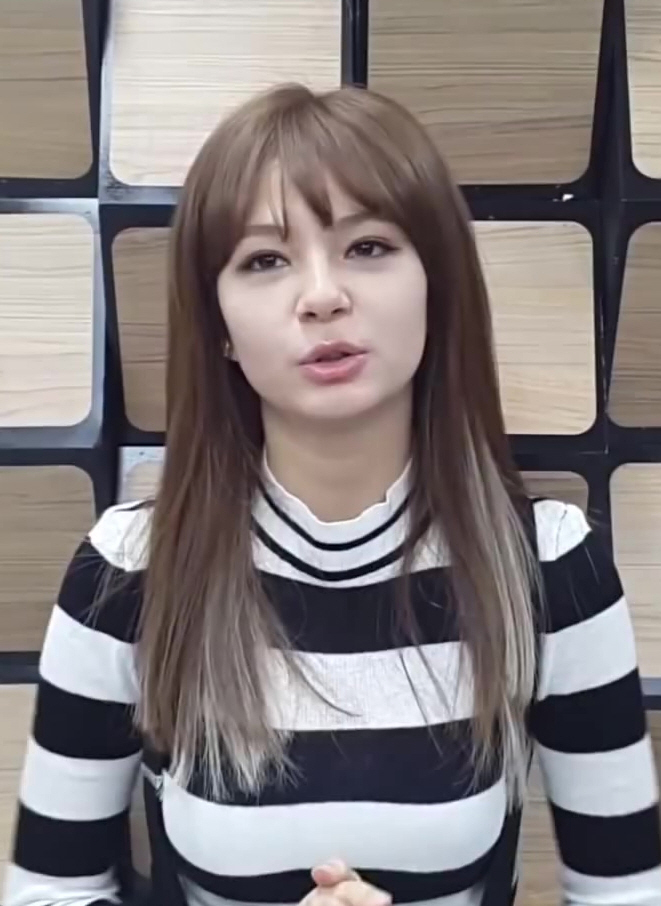
Shannon

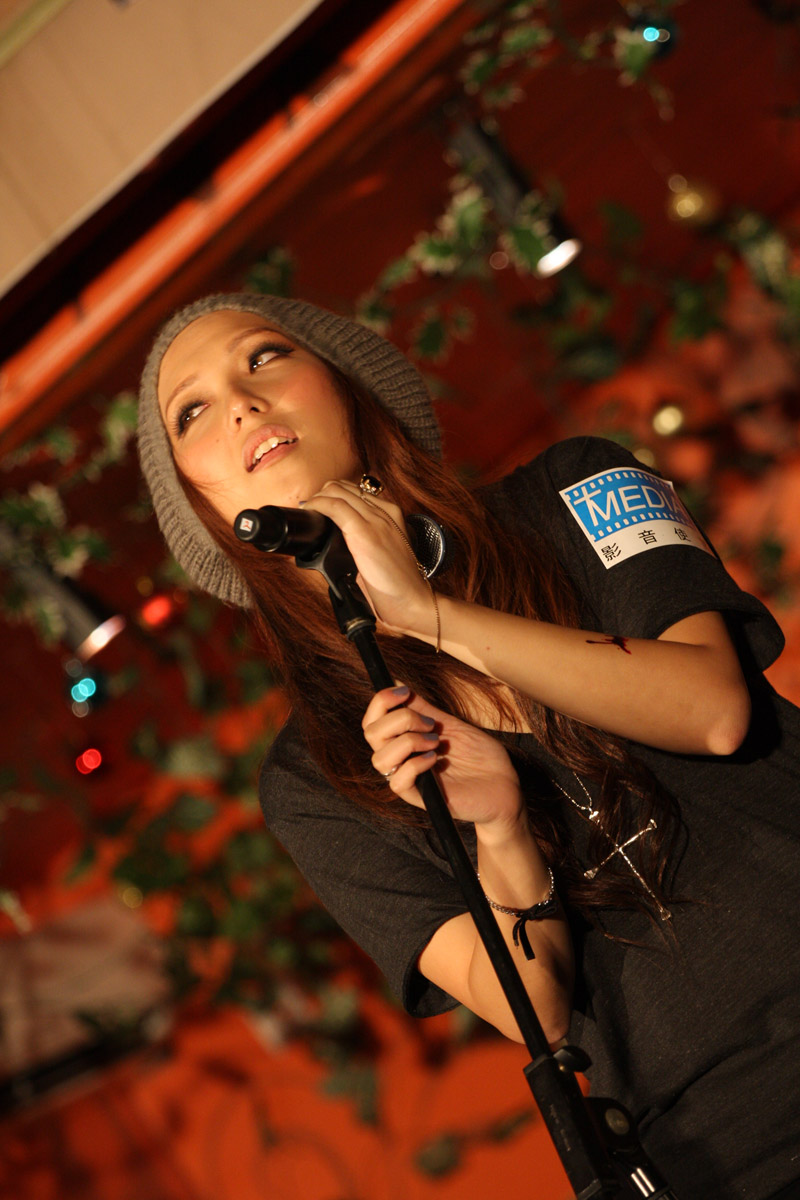
Jill Vidal

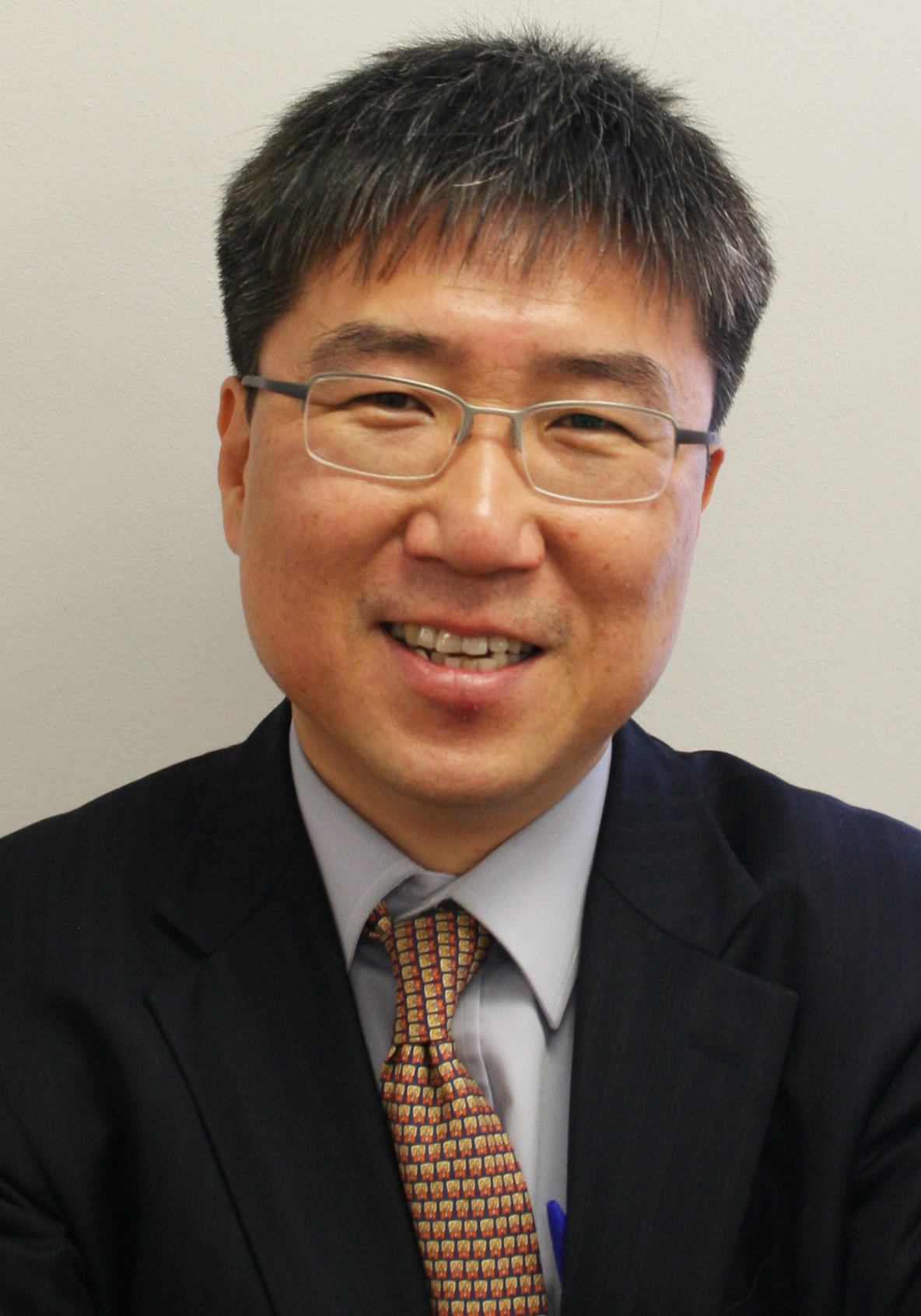
Ha-Joon Chang

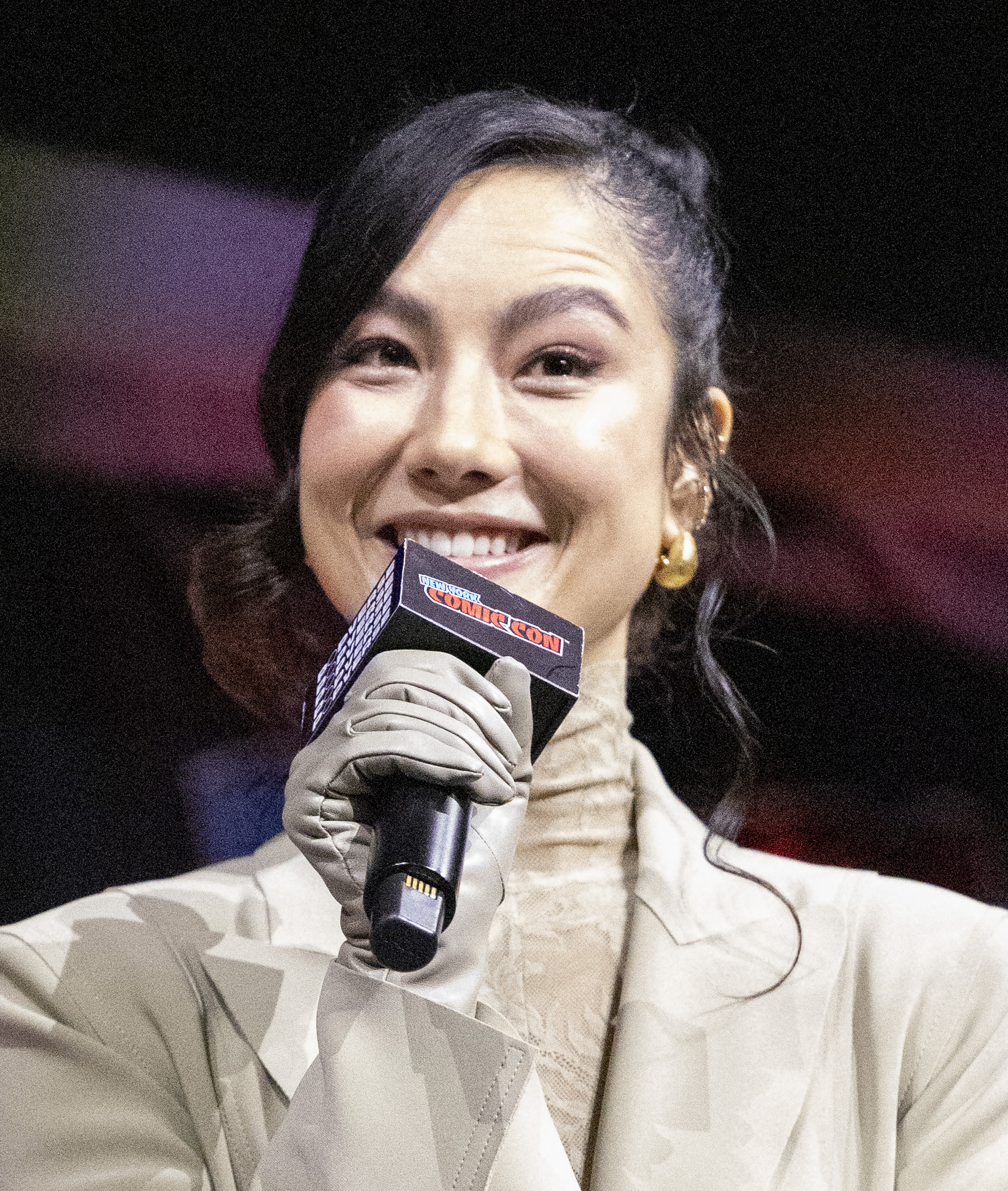
Adeline Rudolph

- Jean-Baptiste Kim, former unofficial North Korean spokesman in France, now living in Surrey
- Park Ji-sung, former football player with Manchester United F.C. and Queens Park Rangers
- Lee Chung-yong, football player with Crystal Palace F.C.
- Ki Sung-yueng, football player with Newcastle United
- Son Heung-min, football player with Tottenham Hotspur F.C.
- Yongcheol Shin, econometrician and professor
- Adeline Rudolph, actress
- Ha-Joon Chang, economist, University of Cambridge
- Insook Chappell, playwright
- Suji Kwock Kim, poet and playwright
- Clara Lee, South Korean actress of Korean and British descent born in Switzerland
- Edeline Lee, fashion designer
- Ela Lee, author
- Jessica Lee, musical theatre actress
- Shannon, South Korean singer of Korean and Welsh descent
- Jill Vidal, Hong Kong singer of Korean and Filipino descent
- Sue Son, South Korean classical violinist.
- Jack Aitken, racing driver
- Hwang Hee-chan, football player with Wolverhampton Wanderers F.C.
- Kris Kim, golfer
- Ioanna Kimbook, Cyprus-born actress
- Su Scott, food writer
- Victoria Wyant, actress
- Rina Yang, Japan-born cinematographer
- Yiruma, South Korean pianist.
- Su-a Lee, South Korean-born Scottish cellist
- Hyung-ki Joo, pianist
- Peggy Gou, DJ and record producer based in Berlin
- Joshua Kim, politician first person of Korean descent elected to a parliament of the UK (Welsh Senedd)
- Minnie Mills, actress

== See also ==
- South Korea–United Kingdom relations
- North Korea–United Kingdom relations
- British East and Southeast Asian
- East Asians in the United Kingdom
