= Walter Godfrey (diplomat) =

British diplomat (1907–1976)

Sir Walter Godfrey KBE

British Ambassador to South Korea
- In office 1961–1966
- Preceded by: Hubert Evans
- Succeeded by: Ian Clayton Mackenzie

Personal details
- Born: 14 December 1907
- Died: 18 October 1976 (aged 68)
- Children: 3
- Education: Jesus College, Cambridge
- Occupation: Diplomat

Sir Walter Godfrey (14 December 1907 – 18 October 1976) was a British diplomat who served as ambassador to South Korea from 1961 to 1966.

== Early life and education ==
Godfrey was born on 14 December 1907, the son of Frank Godfrey. He was educated at Battersea Grammar School and Jesus College, Cambridge where he graduated in 1929.

== Career ==
Godfrey joined the Department of Overseas Trade as an intelligence officer cadet in 1929. In the following year, he was appointed assistant to the British senior trade commissioner of India, Burma and Ceylon stationed in Bombay and Calcutta until 1938.

In 1938, he was appointed third secretary (commercial) at Paris where he remained until the German invasion of the country, and then sent to South America and served on the secretariat of the Willingdon Mission. After spending a year at the British Embassy in Washington as commercial secretary, he served as private secretary to the Secretary for Overseas Trade until 1943. The following year, he was promoted to second secretary (commercial) and sent to the French Committee of National Liberation Office in Algiers. From 1944 to 1946, he served as first secretary (commercial) at Paris.

From 1946 to 1950, he served as a senior UK trade commissioner in Calcutta in 1946; in Delhi in 1947; and in Karachi from 1947 to 1950. In 1952, following promotion to minister (commercial), he was posted to Rio de Janeiro, and then two years later, to Cairo in a similar position. From 1954 to 1956, he served as a senior inspector of foreign service establishments. In 1961, he was appointed ambassador to South Korea, a post he held until 1966 when he retired. In retirement he became honorary chairman of the Anglo-Korean Society.

== Personal life and death ==
Godfrey married Elizabeth Houston in 1943, and they had three sons.

Godfrey died on 18 October 1976, aged 68.

== Honours ==
Godfrey was appointed Commander of the Order of the British Empire (CBE) in the 1952 New Year Honours, and promoted to Knight Commander (KBE) in the 1964 New Year Honours.

== See also ==
- South Korea–United Kingdom relations

Diplomatic posts
Preceded by Hubert Evans	British Ambassador to South Korea; 1961–1966	Succeeded by Ian Clayton Mackenzie
