= Thomas Harris (diplomat) =

British banker and diplomat (1945–2021)

Sir Thomas George Harris KBE CMG (born 6 February 1945, died 12 October 2021) was a British banker and former diplomat who served as the British ambassador to South Korea.

== Career ==
From 2004 Harris served as the Vice Chairman of the financial services and banking company Standard Chartered and a non-executive director of Standard Chartered Korea. Harris was also a non-executive director of the chemicals and technology company Johnson Matthey and the medical technology company Biocompatibles. He was also Chairman of the Trade Policy Panel of the British Bankers Association.

As a member of the British Diplomatic Service Harris was the British Ambassador to South Korea from 1993 to 1997 and held diplomatic posts at the British embassies in Lagos, Tokyo, and Washington, D.C. In the United States Harris was the British Consul General in New York City from 1999 to 2004 and the United Kingdom's Director General for Trade and Investment. In his interview with Emily Maitlis, Prince Andrew, Duke of York, claimed that he stayed with Harris when he was in New York in April 2001. Harris has said that he did not recall this visit, but did remember meeting the Duke in October of that year. He was appointed CMG in the 1995 Birthday Honours. Harris was the Director General for Export Promotion for the United Kingdom between 1997 and 1999.

Harris was a Director of the UK India Business Council and Asia House. Harris was the Chairman of the Pakistan Britain Trade and Investment Forum and the Taiwan British Business Council. In the British Civil Service Harris held several appointments in the Foreign and Commonwealth Office, the Cabinet Office and the Department of Trade and Industry.

Harris was knighted in the 2002 New Year Honours.

Diplomatic posts
Preceded by David Wright	Ambassador Extraordinary and Plenipotentiary to the Republic of South Korea; 1994–1997	Succeeded by Sir Stephen Brown
