= List of ambassadors of the United Kingdom to South Korea =

His Majesty's Ambassador to South Korea
- Coat of Arms of the United Kingdom

- British diplomatic flag

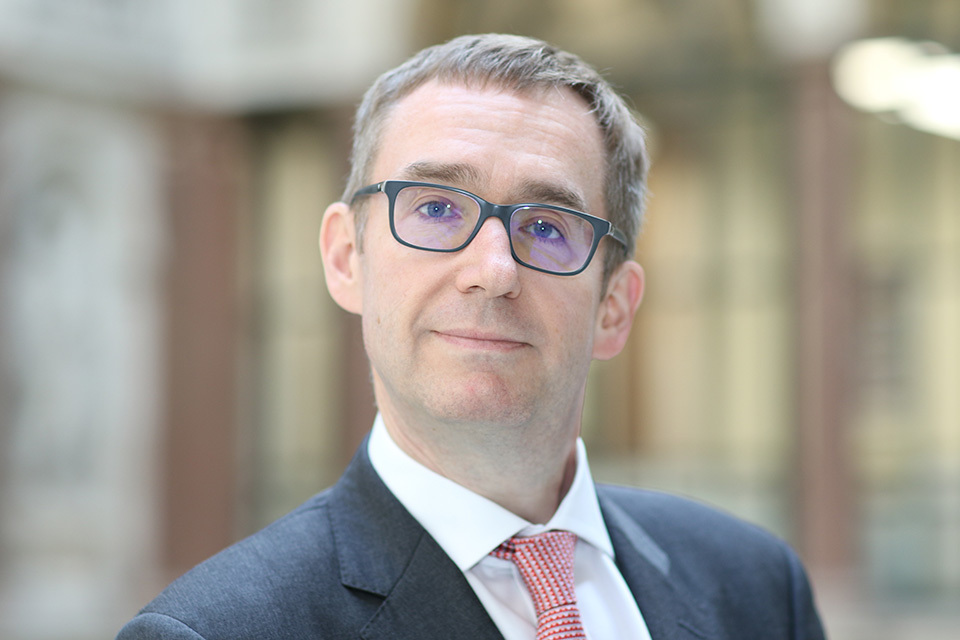
- Incumbent; Colin Crooks since March 2022
- Foreign, Commonwealth and Development Office; British Embassy in Seoul
- Style: His Excellency
- Reports to: Secretary of State for Foreign, Commonwealth and Development Affairs
- Residence: Sejong-daero 19-gil 24, Jung-gu, Seoul
- Appointer: The Crown on advice of the prime minister of the United Kingdom
- Term length: At His Majesty's pleasure
- Inaugural holder: Vyvyan Holt; Envoy Extraordinary and Minister Plenipotentiary
- Formation: 1949
- Deputy: Sue Kinoshita, Minister Counsellor, Deputy Head of Mission and Director of UK Trade and Investment
- Salary: £95,000-£100,000
- Website: British Embassy Seoul

The British ambassador to South Korea is in charge of the United Kingdom's diplomatic mission to South Korea. The official title is His Britannic Majesty's Ambassador to the Republic of Korea (ROK).

== History ==
Under the Imperial Chinese tributary system, Korea was a tributary state to China. After the United Kingdom–Korea Treaty of 1883 British Ministers to China were appointed as "Her Majesty's Envoy Extraordinary and Minister Plenipotentiary to His Majesty the Emperor of China, and also Her Majesty's Envoy Extraordinary and Minister Plenipotentiary to His Majesty the King of Corea." Britain also appointed consuls-general to be resident in Seoul, but they were not heads of mission, as the head of mission was the minister in Peking (now Beijing). In 1898, following the First Sino-Japanese War (1894–95), the Korean Empire became independent of China, and Britain appointed a chargé d'affaires who became Minister Resident when the United Kingdom and Korea exchanged envoys in 1901.

== Consul-General in Seoul ==
British representative to Joseon (until 1897) and later Korean Empire (after 1897).

- 1884–1885: William George Aston
- 1889–1896: Walter Hillier
- 1896–1898: John Jordan

== Head of mission to Korea ==
=== Minister to China, non-resident minister to Korea ===
Holders were station in Beijing.

- 1884–1885: Sir Harry Smith Parkes
- 1885–1892: Sir John Walsham, 2nd Baronet
- 1892–1895: Sir Nicholas O'Conor
- 1896–1898: Sir Claude MacDonald

=== Chargé d'affaires ===
- 1898–1901: John Jordan

=== Minister Resident ===
- 1901–1905: Sir John Jordan

Under the Japan–Korea Treaty of 1905 Korea became a protectorate of Japan, and Britain and other countries withdrew diplomatic missions from Seoul. After World War II Japan's rule ended and Korea was occupied by the Soviet Union and United States, resulting in division of Korea between the Democratic People's Republic of Korea (North Korea) and the Republic of Korea (South Korea).

== Korea under Japanese rule ==
From 1910 to 1945 Korea was under Dependent territory of the Empire of Japan, thus no longer required a diplomatic mission.

== Head of mission to South Korea ==
The current mission represents South Korea, while the ambassador for North Korea did not exist until 2000.

=== Envoys extraordinary and ministers plenipotentiary ===
- 1949–1954: Captain Vyvyan Holt (consul-general from 1948).
- 1954–1956: Charles Stewart
- 1957: Hubert Evans

=== Ambassadors extraordinary and plenipotentiary ===
- 1957–1961: Hubert Evans
- 1961–1966: Sir Walter Godfrey
- 1967–1969: Ian Clayton Mackenzie
- 1969–1971: Nigel Trench
- 1971–1974: Jeffrey Charles Petersen
- 1975–1980: William Bates
- 1980–1983: John Morgan
- 1983–1986: Nicholas Spreckley
- 1986–1990: Lawrence Middleton
- 1990–1993: David Wright
- 1994–1997: Thomas Harris
- 1997–2000: Sir Stephen Brown
- 2000–2003: Charles Humfrey
- 2003–2008: Warwick Morris
- 2008–2011: Martin Uden
- 2011–2015: Scott Wightman
- 2015–2018: Charles Hay
- 2018–2022: Simon Smith
- 2022–present: Colin Crooks

== See also ==
- British Embassy, Seoul
- Embassy of Korea in the United Kingdom
- South Korea–United Kingdom relations
  - United Nations Command
  - United Kingdom in the Korean War
  - United Nations Memorial Cemetery
  - 1st Commonwealth Division
  - KATCOM
  - British Commonwealth Forces Korea
- Foreign, Commonwealth and Development Office
- Foreign relations of the United Kingdom
- List of diplomatic missions of the United Kingdom
- List of diplomatic missions in South Korea
