= David Wright (British diplomat) =

British diplomat

Sir David Wright GCMG LVO
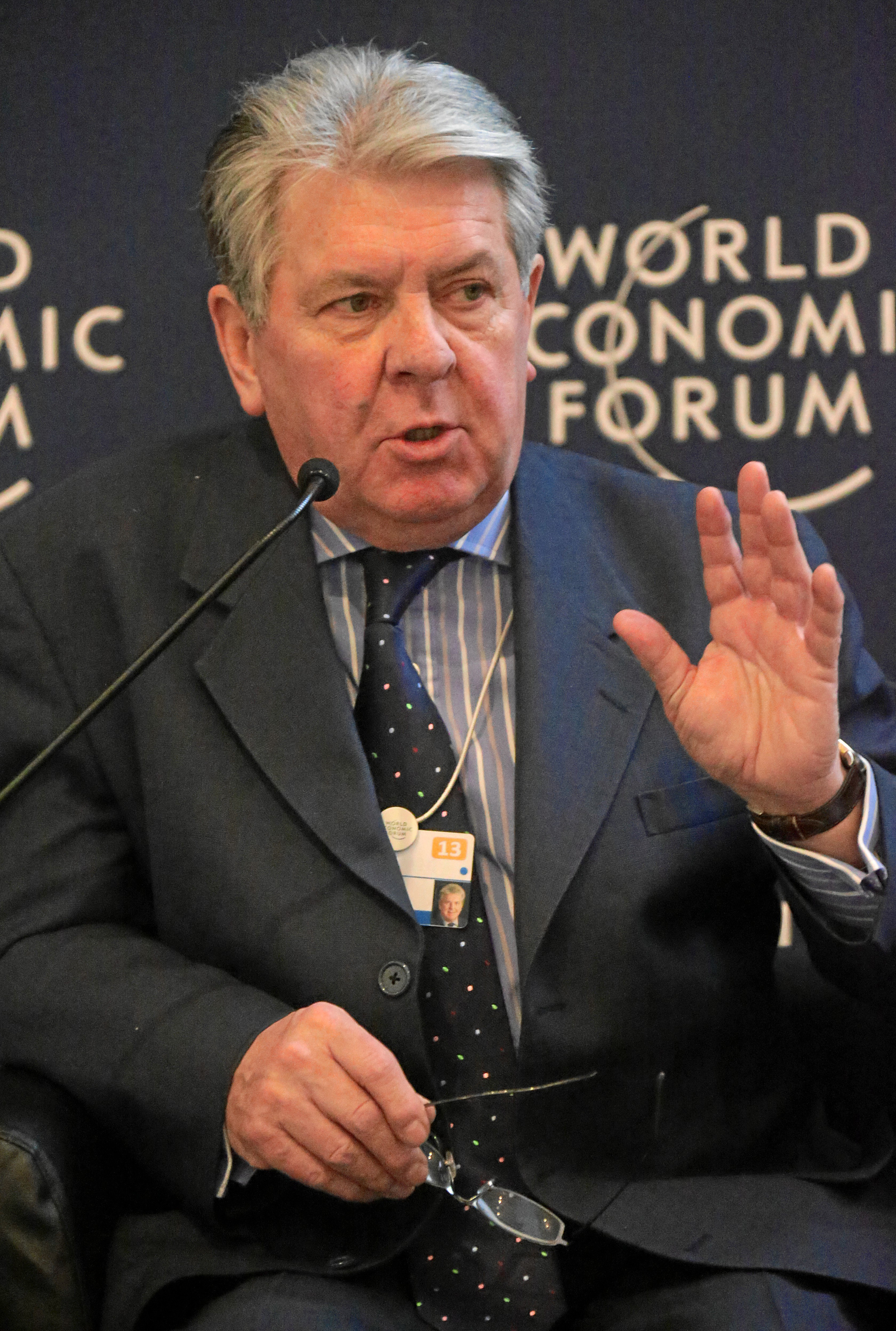
- Wright at the World Economic Forum Annual Meeting in 2013

British Ambassador to Japan
- In office 1996–1999
- Monarch: Elizabeth II
- Prime Minister: John Major; Tony Blair
- Preceded by: Sir John Boyd
- Succeeded by: Sir Stephen Gomersall

British Ambassador to Korea
- In office 1990–1993
- Monarch: Elizabeth II
- Prime Minister: John Major
- Preceded by: Lawrence Middleton
- Succeeded by: Thomas Harris (diplomat)

Personal details
- Born: 16 June 1944 (age 82)
- Education: Peterhouse, Cambridge

Sir David John Wright GCMG LVO (born 16 June 1944) is a former British diplomat who served as British Ambassador to Korea during 1990 to 1993 and British Ambassador to Japan during 1996–1999.

== Early life ==
Wright was educated at Wolverhampton Grammar School, and at Peterhouse, Cambridge.

== Diplomatic career ==
He joined the Foreign Office in 1966 and was posted as Third Secretary, later Second Secretary, to Tokyo. He returned to the FCO in 1972 and was promoted in London to First Secretary before attending the École nationale d'administration in Paris in 1975. From 1976 to 1980 he was posted as First Secretary to the Paris Embassy. He was seconded to be Private Secretary to the Secretary of the Cabinet (1980–1982), as a Grade 7 civil servant. From 1982 to 1985 he was Counsellor (Economic) in Tokyo.

Returning again to the FCO, he was Head of the Personnel Services Department from 1985 to 1988. From there he was seconded to be Deputy Private Secretary to the Prince of Wales (1988–1990).

Wright was appointed Ambassador to South Korea in 1990 and four years later returned to London as Deputy Under Secretary of State in the Foreign and Commonwealth Office. From 1996 to 1999 he was appointed Ambassador to Japan, a post which he left to become Chief Executive of British Trade International, which promotes British exports and inward investment. He retired in 2002.

As of 2014, he is the Chairman of the Governing Body of the Perse School, Cambridge.

== Post-retirement ==
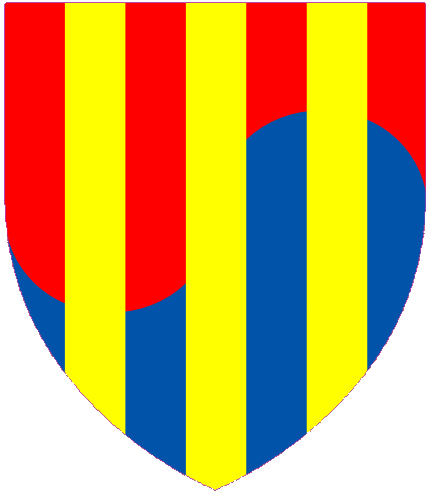
Shield of arms granted in 2010: Per fess wavy of one trough and one crest Gules and Azure three pallets Or.

After retiring from HM Diplomatic Service, Wright joined Barclays Capital, the investment banking arm of the Barclays group, as Vice Chairman where he is responsible for banking client relations in Asia-Pacific and Barclays links with UK government and other public entities. He is also vice-president of the China-Britain Business Council, a member of the International Advisory Board of All Nippon Airways, and a Governor of the Royal Shakespeare Company. He is the current chair at the Korean British Business Council.

He was made a LVO in 1990, CMG in 1992, promoted to KCMG in 1996 and further promoted to GCMG in 2002.

As of December 2017, Wright is chairman of the board at Skarbek Associates.

== See also ==
- Anglo-Japanese relations
- Heads of the United Kingdom Mission in Japan
- South Korea-United Kingdom relations
- List of ambassadors of the United Kingdom to South Korea

Diplomatic posts
Preceded by Sir John Boyd	British Ambassador to Japan; 1996–1999	Succeeded by Sir Stephen Gomersall
