= BTG Limited =

British healthcare company

- Type: Subsidiary
- Traded as: LSE: BTG
- Industry: Healthcare
- Founded: 1991; 35 years ago (as British Technology Group Ltd.)
- Headquarters: London, United Kingdom
- Key people: Garry Watts (chairman of the board); Louise Makin (CEO); Duncan Kennedy (CFO)
- Products: Development, manufacturing and commercialisation of specialty pharmaceuticals and interventional medicine in the areas of critical care, cancer and varicose veins. BTG also has a revenue stream from royalty payments on partnered products.
- Revenue: £620.5 million (2018)
- Parent: Boston Scientific
- Website: btgplc.com

BTG Limited is an international specialist healthcare company that is developing and commercialising products targeting critical care, cancer and other disorders. The current name was adopted when the British Technology Group changed its name on 27 May 1998. BTG was a constituent of the FTSE 250 Index until it was acquired by Boston Scientific in August 2019.

== History ==
In 1948, the National Research Development Corporation was formed with the purpose of commercialising innovations that arose from public funded research. This was complemented, in November 1975, by the establishment of the National Enterprise Board to implement the then-Government's policy of moving public sector industry into commercial private enterprise.

During 1983, the British Technology Group acquired the commercialisation rights to magnetic resonance imaging (MRI) (under a revenue share scheme). Thereafter, it proceeded to license a large part of the world market in MRI, including licensees such as General Electric and Philips.

These two organisations were merged by the Government in 1981 to form a new, non-statutory body called the British Technology Group.

During the early 1990s, the British Technology Group was reorganised under a statutory footing as per the British Technology Group Act 1991. initially, HM Treasury was the organisation's sole shareholder. In March 1992, the private equity firm Cinven arranged a management buy-out of the British Technology Group from the British Government. Three years later, the company was floated on the London Stock Exchange.

On 27 May 1998, it was rebranded as BTG Limited, after which it primarily focused on the development and commercialising of medical innovations.

BTG plc completed the acquisition of Protherics PLC in December 2008 and of Biocompatibles International plc in January 2011. In May 2016, BTG plc acquired the Israeli company Galil Medical for US$110 million. In September 2018, BTG plc acquired Novate Medical for up to $150 million.

In August 2019, the American company Boston Scientific acquired BTG in exchange for US$4.2 billion.

== Operations ==
BTG earns revenues from specialty pharmaceutical and interventional medicine product sales and on royalties from partnered products. It trades as BTG International Inc. in the United States and as BTG International Ltd. in the United Kingdom.

== See also ==
- Medical research
- National Enterprise Board
- National Research Development Corporation
