= South Korea–United Kingdom relations =

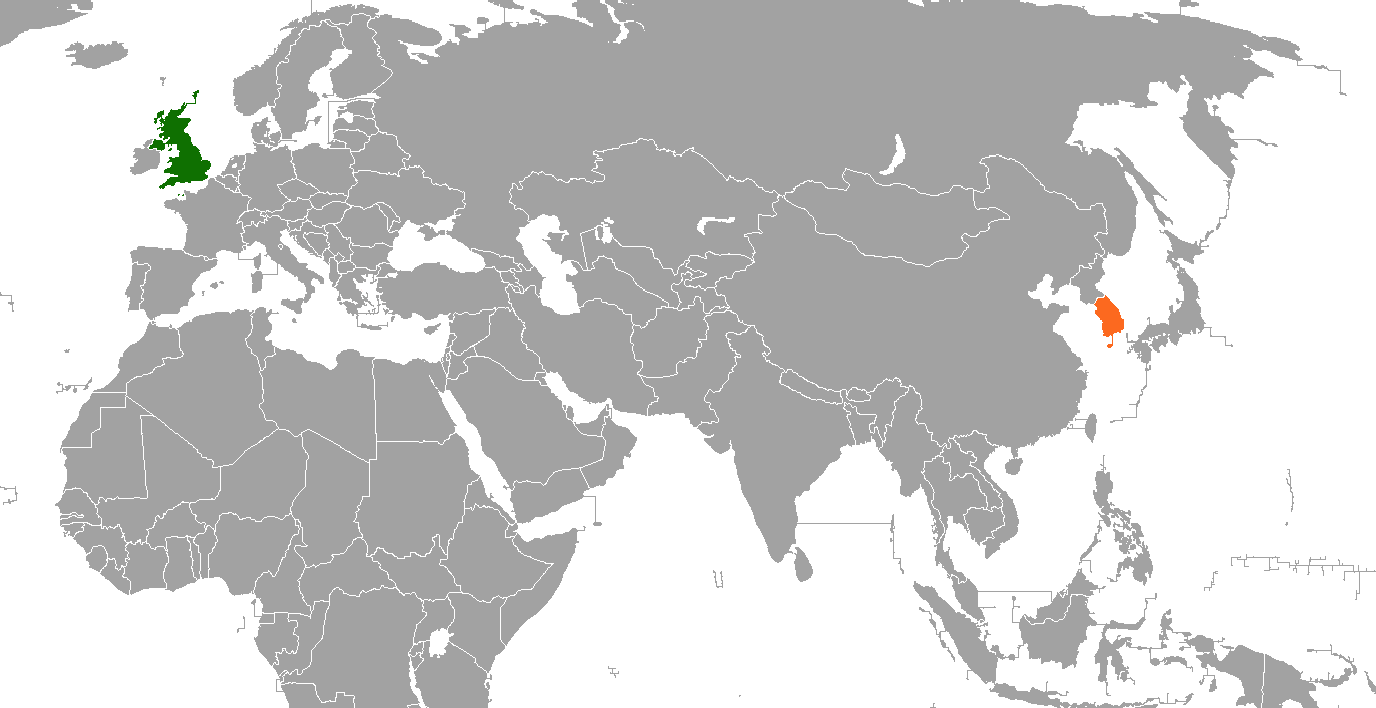

- United Kingdom: South Korea

Diplomatic mission
- British Embassy Seoul: Embassy of South Korea, London

Envoy
- Ambassador Colin Crooks: Ambassador Vacant

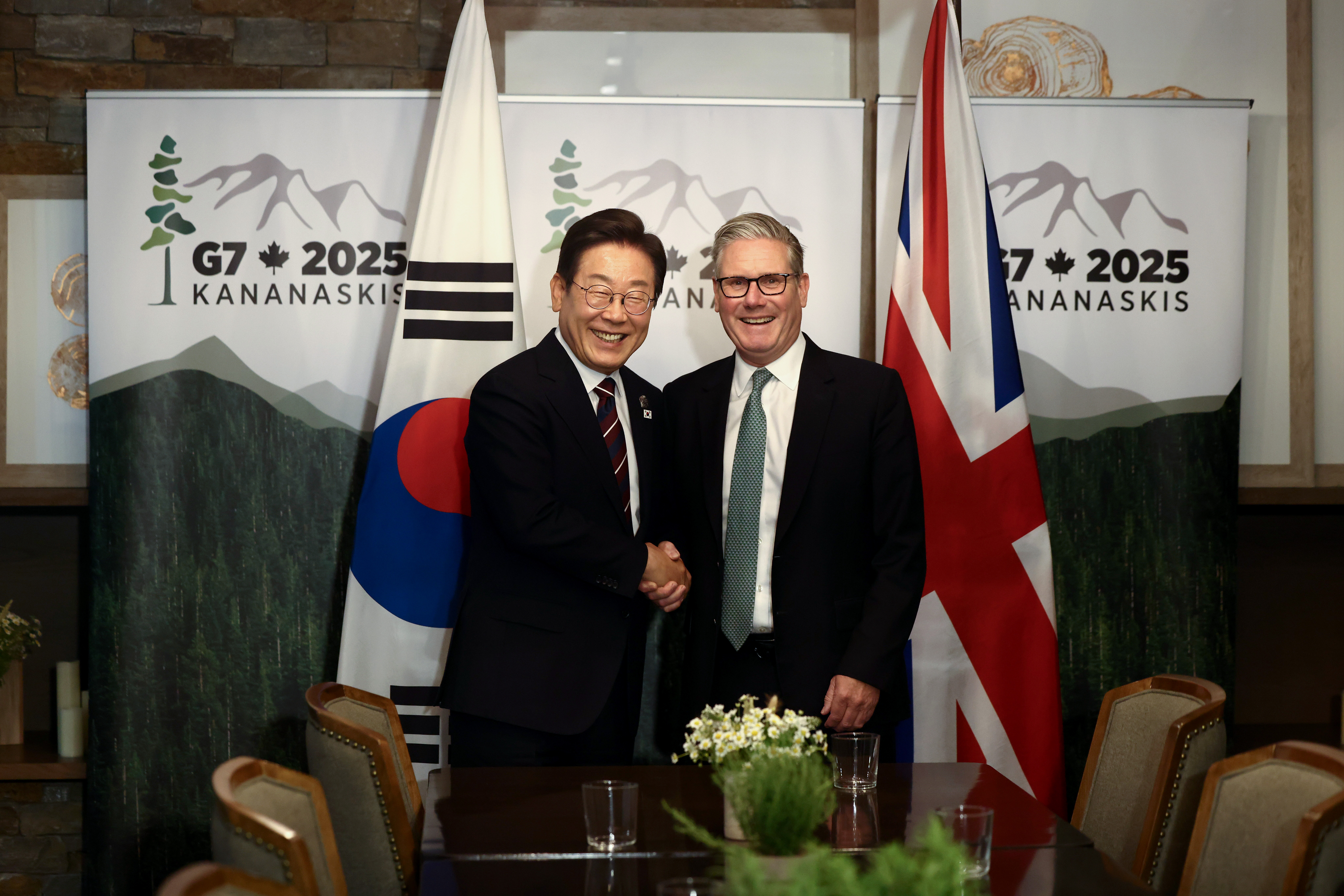
South Korean President Lee Jae-myung with British Prime Minister Keir Starmer at a G7 summit in Kananaskis, June 2025.

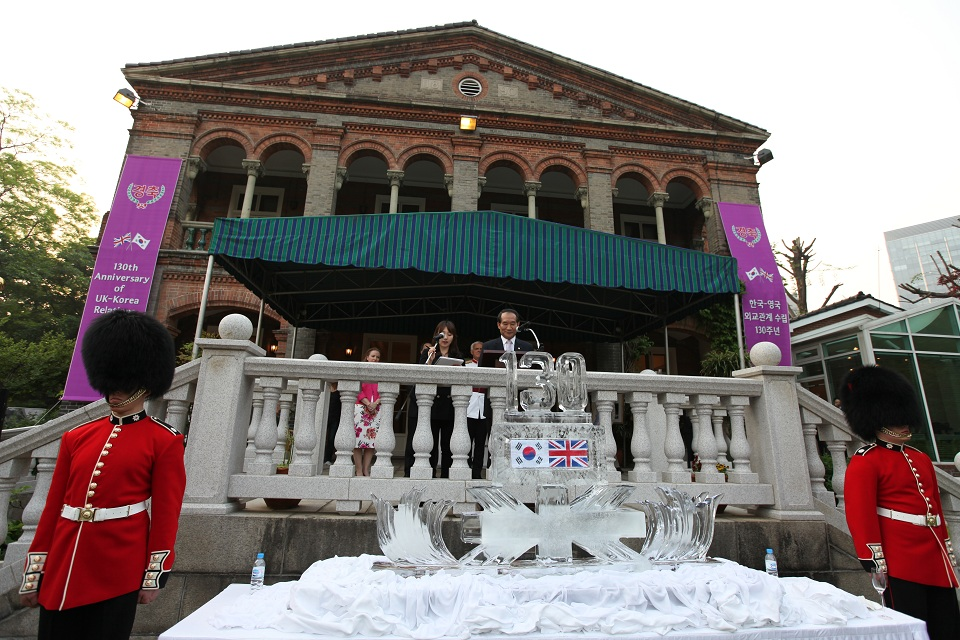
Celebration for the 130th Anniversary of UK-ROK relations on 23 May 2013, at the British Embassy Seoul.

South Korea–United Kingdom relations (Korean: 한영 관계, romanized: hanyeong gwangye) spans from the 19th century to the present day. Although the Republic of Korea gives 18 January 1949 as the date of the establishment of formal relations with the United Kingdom, diplomatic ties through predecessor states go back to the United Kingdom–Korea Treaty of 1883.

Both countries share common membership of the G20, the International Criminal Court, the OECD, the United Nations, and the World Trade Organization. Bilaterally the two countries have a Double Taxation Convention, the Downing Street Accord, and a Trade Agreement. The two countries are negotiating a new Free Trade Agreement.

== History ==
=== Before the 1945 ===
Three Royal Navy ships briefly occupied Geomun Island in 1885. The relationship between the two nations broke off during the period of Japanese colonial rule in Korea between 1910 and 1945.

=== World War II and Korean War ===
After the Second World War, South Korea established diplomatic ties with the United Kingdom on 18 January 1949. The United Kingdom and other British Commonwealth Forces fought alongside South Korea during the Korean War. Almost 100,000 British servicemen fought in the Korean war. Their most famous involvement was the Battle of the Imjin River, a confrontation with Chinese soldiers. 600 soldiers of the British Army took on a force of 30,000 Chinese troops crossing the Imjin River in Korea. At the end of the battle 10,000 Chinese troops had fallen. British losses stood at just 59 and this battle is considered a turning point in the war as it halted the Chinese advance. The Gloucester Valley Battle Monument is a memorial for British soldiers killed at Solma-Ri, South Korea. 1,078 British soldiers died fighting in the Korean war.

=== Post War ===
There is a British embassy in Seoul and a South Korean embassy in London. The UK and South Korea cooperate in world events with other nations such as the United States. They have recent military relations and the UK often supports South Korea's view during periods of turbulent North Korea–South Korea relations. There were about 17,000 South Koreans living in the United Kingdom in 2011. Commercial and trade relationships grew rapidly during the 1970s when Korea started their economical modernisation. Barclays invested on HD Hyundai Heavy Industries and some researchers studied abroad in the UK. During the Asian Financial Crisis in the late 1990s, Queen Elizabeth II made a state visit to South Korea, which was well received at a time of crisis in the country. Today, there are strong economic and diplomatic links between the two countries.

According to a 2014 BBC World Service Poll, 74% of South Koreans view the United Kingdom's influence positively, with 14% viewing the UK negatively. On the other hand, opinion of South Korean influence is divided in the United Kingdom, with 45% of Britons viewing South Korea's influence positively, and 45% viewing them negatively.

In November 2016, the Republic of Korea Air Force conducted a domestic air combat manoeuvering exercise with the British Royal Air Force and the United States Air Force. This was the first such exercise with a foreign nation other than the United States.

== Military relations ==
On 20 November 2023, South Korea and the UK signed the Downing Street accord which exponentially increases military cooperation between the two countries. It has been proposed that the two countries should to forge an institutionalised agreement, modelled upon Japan-U.K. Reciprocal Access Agreement and Mutual Defense Treaty of United States and Republic of Korea, to build upon the Downing Street accord further.

Before the Agreement of Downing Street of The Republic of Korea and the United Kingdom of Great Britain and Northern Ireland is signed and applied, British Armed Forces are second largest participants of United Nations Command since United Kingdom sent their troops during Korean War as UN Forces and KATCOM. Andrew Harrison of British Army was the Deputy Commander of UN Commands.

== Economic relations ==
From 1 July 2011 until 30 December 2020, trade between South Korea and the United Kingdom was governed by the European Union–South Korea Free Trade Agreement, while the United Kingdom was a member of the European Union. Following the withdrawal of the United Kingdom from the European Union, the UK and South Korea signed a continuity trade agreement on 22 August 2019, based on the EU free trade agreement; the agreement entered into force on 1 January 2021. Trade value between South Korea and the United Kingdom was worth £18,349 million in 2022.

Both countries opened negotiations for an updated South Korea–United Kingdom Free Trade Agreement.

== Diplomatic missions ==
- South Korea maintains an embassy in London.
- The United Kingdom is accredited to South Korea through its embassy in Seoul.

== High-level exchanges ==
=== From South Korea to the UK ===
- 1986 April President Chun Doo-hwan
- 1989 November President Roh Tae-woo
- 1995 March President Kim Young-sam
- 1998 April President Kim Dae-jung
- 2001 December President Kim Dae-jung
- 2004 December President Roh Moo-hyun
- 2006 February Minister of Foreign Affairs and Trade Ban Ki-moon
- 2006 June Minister of Foreign Affairs and Trade Ban Ki-moon
- 2006 May Deputy Prime Minister for Economic Affairs Han Duck-soo
- 2007 May Deputy Prime Minister for Economy Affairs Kwon Oh-kyu
- 2007 June Chairman of Financial Supervisory Service Yoon Jeung-hyun
- 2008 May Chairman of Financial Supervisory Service Jeon Kwang-woo
- 2008 May Minister of Strategy and Finance Kang Man-soo
- 2008 October Presidential Special Envoy Sa-Kong-il
- 2009 February Presidential Special Envoy Sa Kong-il
- 2009 April President Lee Myung-bak (G20)
- 2010 January Minister of Foreign Affairs and Trade Yu Myung-hwan
- 2010 May Minister of Health and Welfare Jeon Jae-hee
- 2013 April Special envoy of the president former prime minister Han Seung-soo (to attend the funeral of former British prime minister Margaret Thatcher)
- 2013 November President Park Geun-hye
- 2014 December Minister of Foreign Affairs and Trade Yun Byung-se
- 2023 November President Yoon Suk Yeol

=== From the UK to South Korea ===
- 1986 May Prime Minister Margaret Thatcher
- 1992 November Prince Charles and Diana, Princess of Wales
- 1996 March Prime Minister John Major
- 1997 April Duke of Gloucester
- 1997 October Duke of Kent
- 1999 April Queen Elizabeth II
- 2000 October Prime Minister Tony Blair
- 2003 July Prime Minister Tony Blair
- 2001 April Duke of York
- 2005 November Duke of York
- 2006 October Deputy Prime Minister John Prescott
- 2008 September Duke of York
- 2008 December G20 Special Envoy Timms
- 2009 October Minister of Business, Innovation and Skills Peter Benjamin Mandelson
- 2010 November Prime Minister David Cameron
- 2012 March Deputy Prime Minister Clegg (to attend Seoul Nuclear Security Summit)
- 2013 October Secretary of State for Foreign and Commonwealth Affairs William Hague (to attend Seoul Conference on Cyberspace 2013)
- 2023 May Minister of State for Indo-Pacific Anne-Marie Trevelyan
- 2026 July The Princess Royal

== See also ==
- British Koreans
- British Commonwealth Forces Korea
- Foreign relations of South Korea
- Foreign relations of the United Kingdom
- KATCOM
- South Korea–United Kingdom Free Trade Agreement
