= South Korea–United Kingdom Free Trade Agreement =

Free trade agreement concluded in 2025

English: Free Trade Agreement between the Republic of Korea and the United Kingdom of Great Britain and Northern Ireland Korean: 대한민국과 영국 간의 자유무역협정
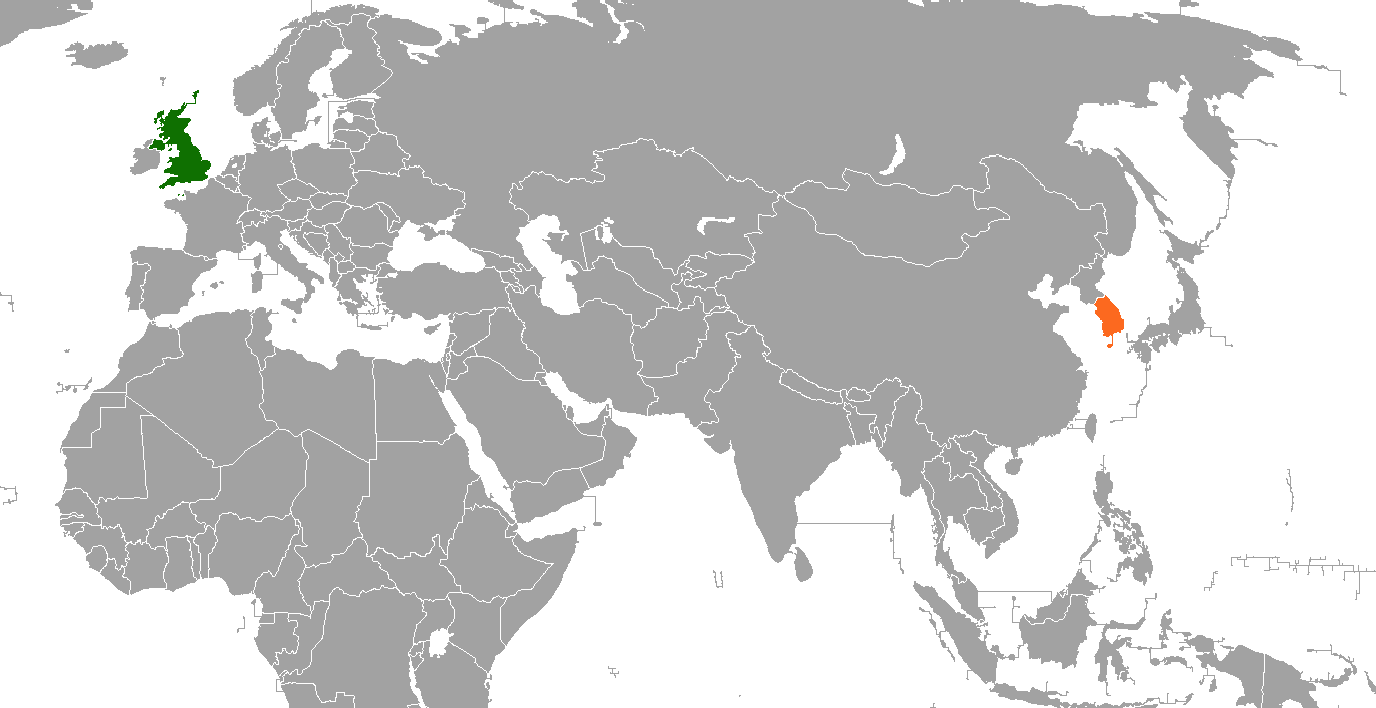
- South Korea United Kingdom
- Type: Free trade agreement
- Context: Trade agreement between South Korea and the United Kingdom
- Drafted: 15 December 2025
- Negotiators: (South Korea) Korean Trade Ministers: Ahn Duk-geun (until 18 July 2025); Kim Jung-kwan (until 16 December 2025, concluded); (United Kingdom) British Trade Ministers: Kemi Badenoch (until 5 July 2024); Jonathan Reynolds (until 5 September 2025); Peter Kyle (until 16 December 2025, concluded)
- Parties: South Korea; United Kingdom
- Language: English; Korean

The South Korea–United Kingdom Free Trade Agreement (Korean: 한영자유무역협정) is a drafted free trade agreement which began negotiations on 22 November 2023. The trade agreement would be the third FTA to cover South Korea–UK trade, superseding the South Korea–UK Trade Agreement; extending the deal to cover digital trade. In 2021, 80% of the UK's services exports, in areas from legal advice to management consultancy, were delivered digitally.

On 15 December 2025, both countries concluded negotiations with an agreement in principle for the free trade agreement.

== History ==
From 1 July 2011 until 30 December 2020, trade between South Korea and the United Kingdom was governed by the European Union–South Korea Free Trade Agreement, while the United Kingdom was a member of the European Union. Following the withdrawal of the United Kingdom from the European Union, the UK and South Korea signed a continuity trade agreement on 22 August 2019, based on the EU free trade agreement; the agreement entered into force on 1 January 2021.

== Negotiations ==
On 9 December 2022, South Korea and the United Kingdom announced their intentions start talks on a modernised free trade agreement; the agreement would supersede the South Korea–UK Trade Continuity agreement. Trade negotiations formally opened on 22 November 2023.

KUKFTA Round of Negotiations
Round	Dates	Location	Ref.
1	23–25 January 2024	Seoul	
2	19–22 March 2024	London	
3	5–14 November 2024	Seoul	
4	10–21 March 2025	London	
5	7–11 July 2025	Seoul	

The first round of negotiations concluded on the 25 January 2024.

The second round of negotiations concluded on the 22 March 2024. After the 2024 United Kingdom general election negotiations resumed on 5 November 2024.

The fourth round of negotiations focused on areas including rules of origin, a comprehensive digital trade chapter, as well as making progress on agreeing new cooperation commitments covering areas such as the environment, trade and gender equality and supply chains.

The fifth round of negotiations covered rules of origin, digital trade, and trade in services.

== See also ==
- South Korea–United Kingdom relations
- Free trade agreements of South Korea
- Free trade agreements of the United Kingdom
- Foreign relations of South Korea
- Foreign relations of the United Kingdom
- List of bilateral free trade agreements
- European Union–South Korea Free Trade Agreement
