= David Gillmore, Baron Gillmore of Thamesfield =

British diplomat

David Howe Gillmore, Baron Gillmore of Thamesfield, GCMG (16 August 1934 – 20 March 1999) was a British diplomat. He retired in 1994 after a distinguished diplomatic career in which he was a leading light in John Major's extrication of the UK from its policy of confronting apartheid South Africa. He was educated at Trent College, Derbyshire, and King's College, Cambridge.

== Career ==
After service in HM Forces from 1953 to 1955, he spent a short time living in Paris, before returning to the UK to work as a French and English teacher at Wilson's Grammar School in Camberwell, London, from 1967 to 1970, where he will be remembered. He joined the Foreign and Commonwealth Office in 1970. Two years later, he was posted as First Secretary (Commercial) to Moscow. He was appointed Counsellor and Head of Chancery UKDEL, MBFR Vienna in 1975. He was appointed Head of Defence Department FCO in 1979, becoming Assistant Under-Secretary of State in 1981. David Gillmore was appointed High Commissioner in Malaysia in 1983. Gillmore was appointed Permanent Under-Secretary at the Foreign Office in 1991,

== Family ==
David Gillmore married Lucile Sophie Morin in 1964. They had two sons, born 1967 and 1970.

== Honours ==
Gillmore was appointed a Companion of the Order of St Michael and St George (CMG) in the 1982 Birthday Honours, promoted to Knight Commander of the Order (KCMG) in the 1990 Birthday Honours, and to Knight Grand Cross of the Order (GCMG) in the 1994 New Year Honours.

In the 1996 New Year Honours, he was created a life peer as Baron Gillmore of Thamesfield, of Putney in the London Borough of Wandsworth.

== Offices held ==
Diplomatic posts
Preceded by Sir William Bentley	British High Commissioner to Malaysia; 1984–1986	Succeeded by Sir Nicholas Spreckley
Government offices
Preceded by Sir Patrick Wright	Permanent Secretary of the Foreign and Commonwealth Office; 1990–1994	Succeeded by Sir John Coles
