= Nicholas Spreckley =

British diplomat (1934–1994)

Sir John Nicholas Teague Spreckley CMG KCVO

British High Commissioner to Malaysia
- In office 1986–1991
- Preceded by: Lord Gillmore
- Succeeded by: Duncan Slater

British Ambassador to South Korea
- In office 1983–1986
- Preceded by: John Morgan
- Succeeded by: Lawrence Middleton

Personal details
- Born: 6 December 1934
- Died: 3 December 1994 (aged 59)
- Children: 2
- Education: Magdalene College, Cambridge
- Occupation: Diplomat

Sir John Nicholas Teague Spreckley (6 December 1934 – 3 December 1994) was a British diplomat who served as Ambassador to South Korea from 1983 to 1986 and High Commissioner to Malaysia from 1986 to 1991.

== Early life and education ==
Spreckley was born on 6 December 1934, the son of Air Marshal Sir Herbert Spreckley KBE and Winifred Teague. He was educated at Winchester College and Magdalene College, Cambridge.

== Career ==
Spreckley joined the Foreign Service in 1957 and was posted to Tokyo where he served until 1962. After four years serving in the Foreign and Commonwealth Office (FCO), he was dispatched to Dakar (1966–1970) and then to Paris (1970–1975). After serving for a few months as head of the referendum unit at the FCO coordinating work on the referendum on continuing membership of the European Community, he returned to Tokyo where, from 1976 to 1978, he was Counsellor and Head of Chancery. After spending a year on sabbatical as a Fellow at the Harvard Center for International Affairs, he returned to the FCO to handle European Community issues as Head of European Communities Department, Internal section.

Spreckley then served as Ambassador to the Republic of Korea between 1983 and 1986. At a time when the country was in the process of rapid transformation to a modern economy causing domestic pressures, and with tensions with its neighbours, including North Korea, Spreckley, according to The Times, "Drawing on his knowledge acquired in neighbouring Japan, and on his own insight and capacity for hard work, established a strong position in a complex country which was changing with bewildering rapidity."

Spreckley was then appointed High Commissioner to Malaysia where he served from 1986 to 1991. As in his previous posting, it was a country undergoing rapid change but, unlike Korea, had strong historical links with Britain. As Britain's fifth largest trading partner there were plenty of opportunities to develop trade and investment which increased substantially during his tenure. However, the consequences arising from an arms deal, which later became known as the Pergau Dam affair, became a worry for Spreckley after his retirement. While some post-colonial friction still lingered and dealings with Prime Minister Mahathir Mohamad could be challenging, according to The Times, "Spreckley conducted a successful mission to a country of great and growing importance to Britain." A highlight of his term in office was Queen Elizabeth II's state visit to Malaysia in 1989. Spreckley was appointed KCVO on the occasion.

== Personal life and death ==
Spreckley married Margaret Stewart in 1958 and they had a son and a daughter. Spreckley maintained links with Korea in retirement as a member of the Anglo-Korean Society and the UK-Korea Forum for the Future.

Spreckley died on 3 December 1994, aged 59.

== Honours ==
Spreckley was appointed Companion of the Order of St Michael and St George (CMG) in the 1983 Birthday Honours. He was appointed Knight Commander of the Royal Victorian Order (KCVO) in 1989.

== See also ==
- Malaysia–United Kingdom relations

Diplomatic posts
Preceded by John Morgan	British Ambassador to South Korea; 1983–1986	Succeeded by Lawrence Middleton
Preceded by Lord Gillmore	High Commissioner of the United Kingdom to Malaysia; 1986–1991	Succeeded by Duncan Slater
