= Embassy of the United Kingdom, Seoul =

Diplomatic mission in South Korea

British Embassy, Seoul 주한영국대사관
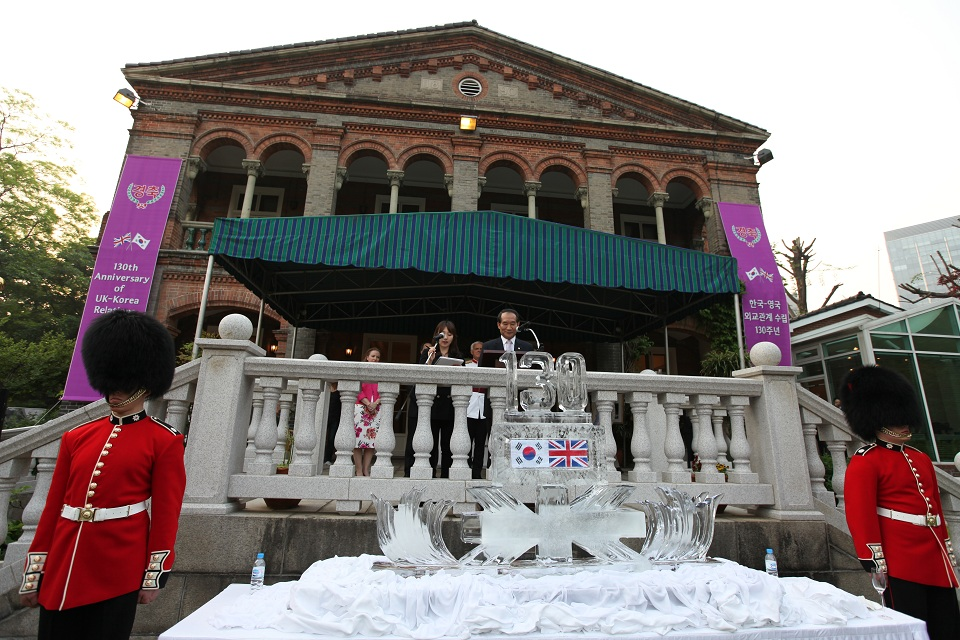
- Embassy building in May 2013.
- Location: (South Korea) Seoul
- Address: Sejong-daero 19-gil 24; Seoul Jung-gu; 04519; South Korea
- Coordinates: 37°34′1.327″N 126°58′30.083″E
- Ambassador: Colin Crooks
- Website: Office website

The British Embassy, Seoul (Note: Also rendered as the British Embassy in Seoul, British Embassy in South Korea, or Embassy of the United Kingdom in Seoul.) (Korean: 주한 영국 대사관) is the chief diplomatic mission of the United Kingdom in South Korea, with the Ambassador of the United Kingdom to South Korea being the chief of mission.

== Role ==
The British embassy in Seoul performs a sustaining role in the diplomatic relations between South Korea and the United Kingdom, dealing with political, economic, and cultural interaction between the two nations, and also offers visa services to Koreans and other nationals in the Republic of Korea.

== History ==
Starting on 11 October 2007, the embassy stopped processing visa requests. Requests after this date are handled by the visa application centre.

The embassy began offering free English-language education and job training to North Korean defectors in May 2011.

In August 2017, the embassy returned part of the land it owned on the street along the Deoksu Palace to create a pedestrian path.

== See also ==
- South Korea–United Kingdom relations
- Embassy of South Korea, London

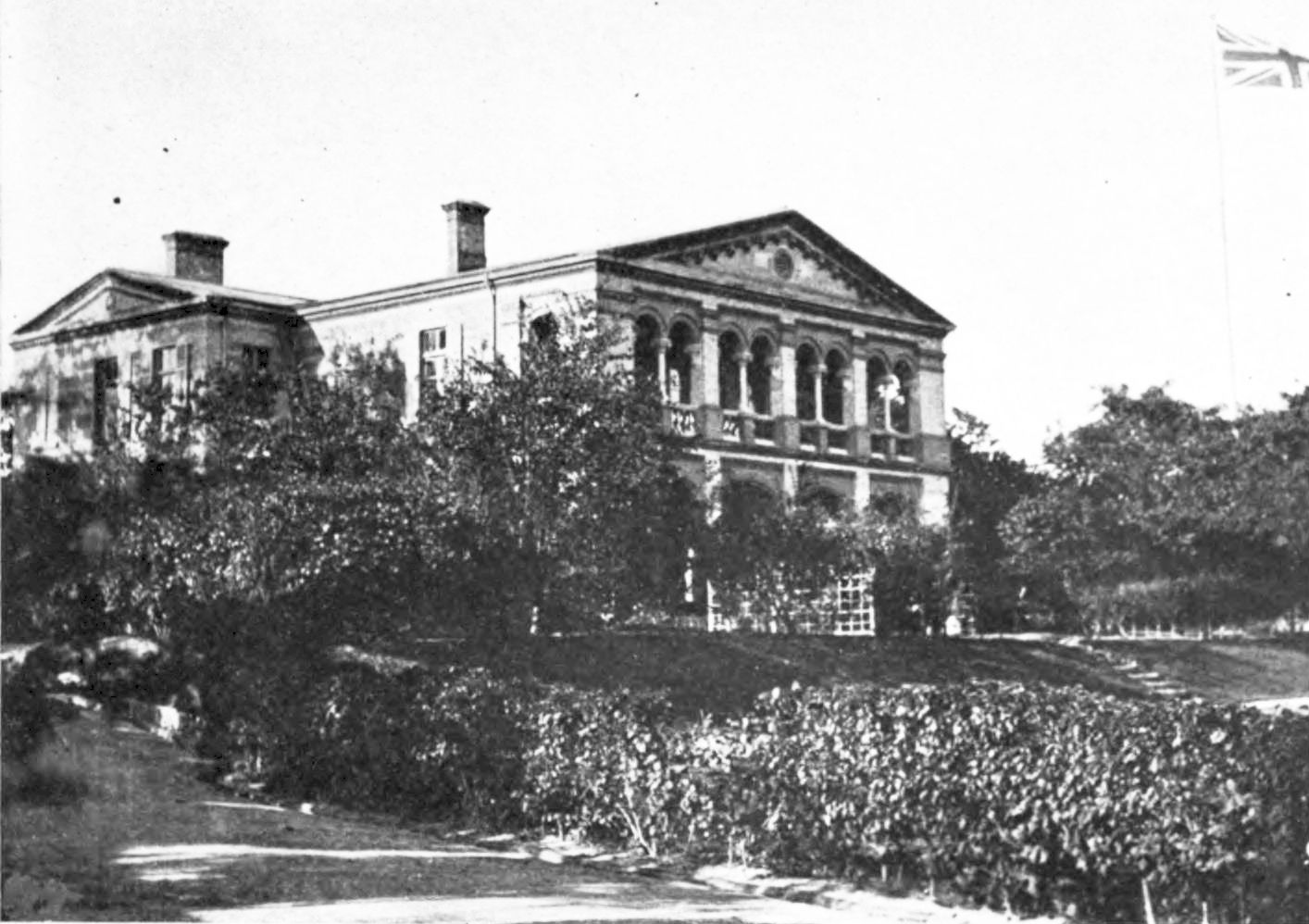
British Legation to Korea, c. 1900.

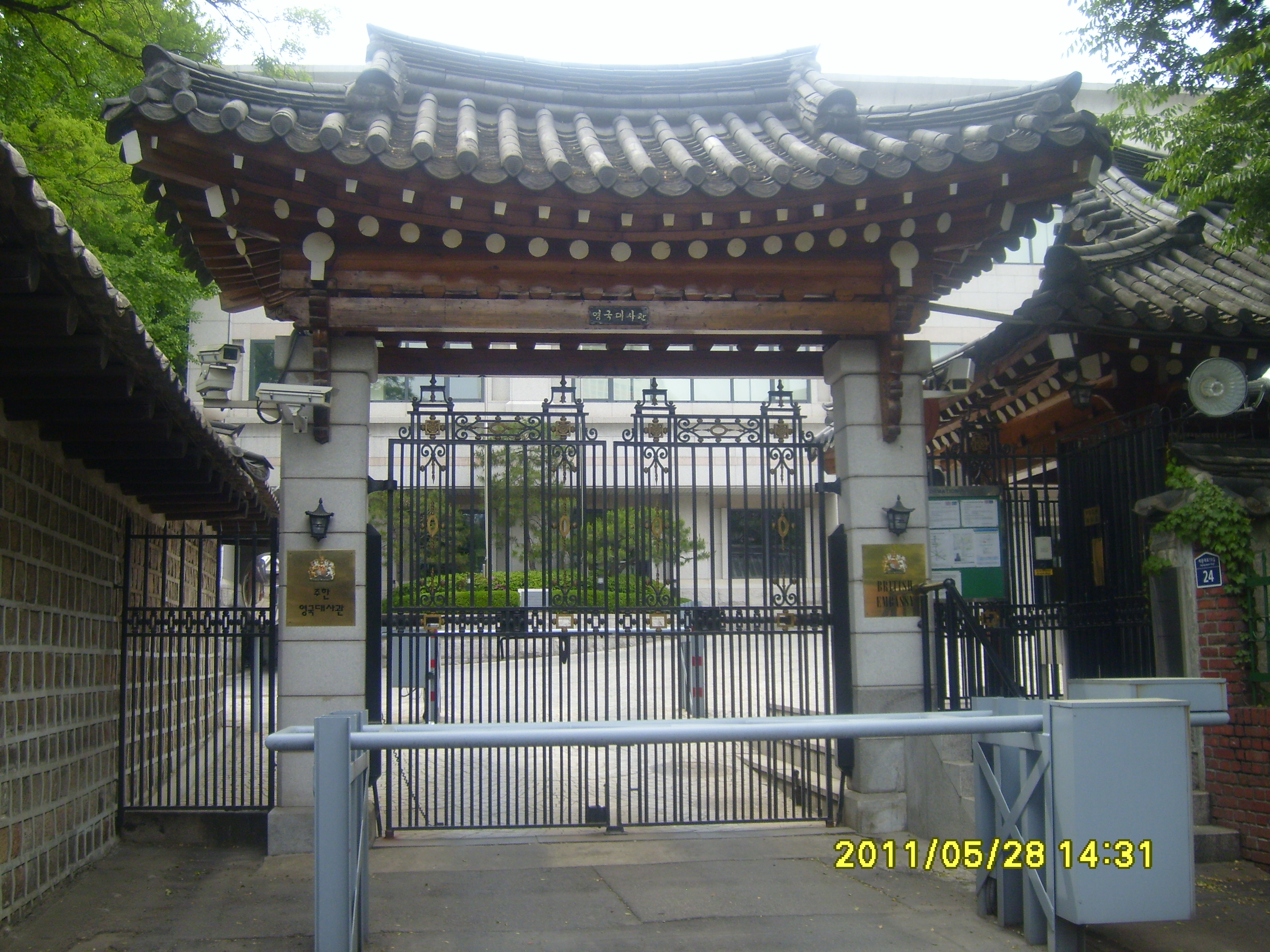
Entrance to the embassy, 2011.
