= Lawrence Middleton =

British diplomat (1930–2019)

Lawrence John Middleton CMG (27 March 1930 – 10 December 2019) was a British diplomat.

He was educated at King's College London (BSc, 1951; PhD, 1954) and served as British Ambassador to South Korea from 1986 to 1990.

== Honours ==
- Companion of the Order of St Michael and St George (CMG) – 1985

Diplomatic posts
Preceded by Nicholas Spreckley	British Ambassador to South Korea; 1986–1990	Succeeded by Sir David Wright
