= John Morgan (diplomat) =

British diplomat (1929–2012)

Sir John Morgan KCMG
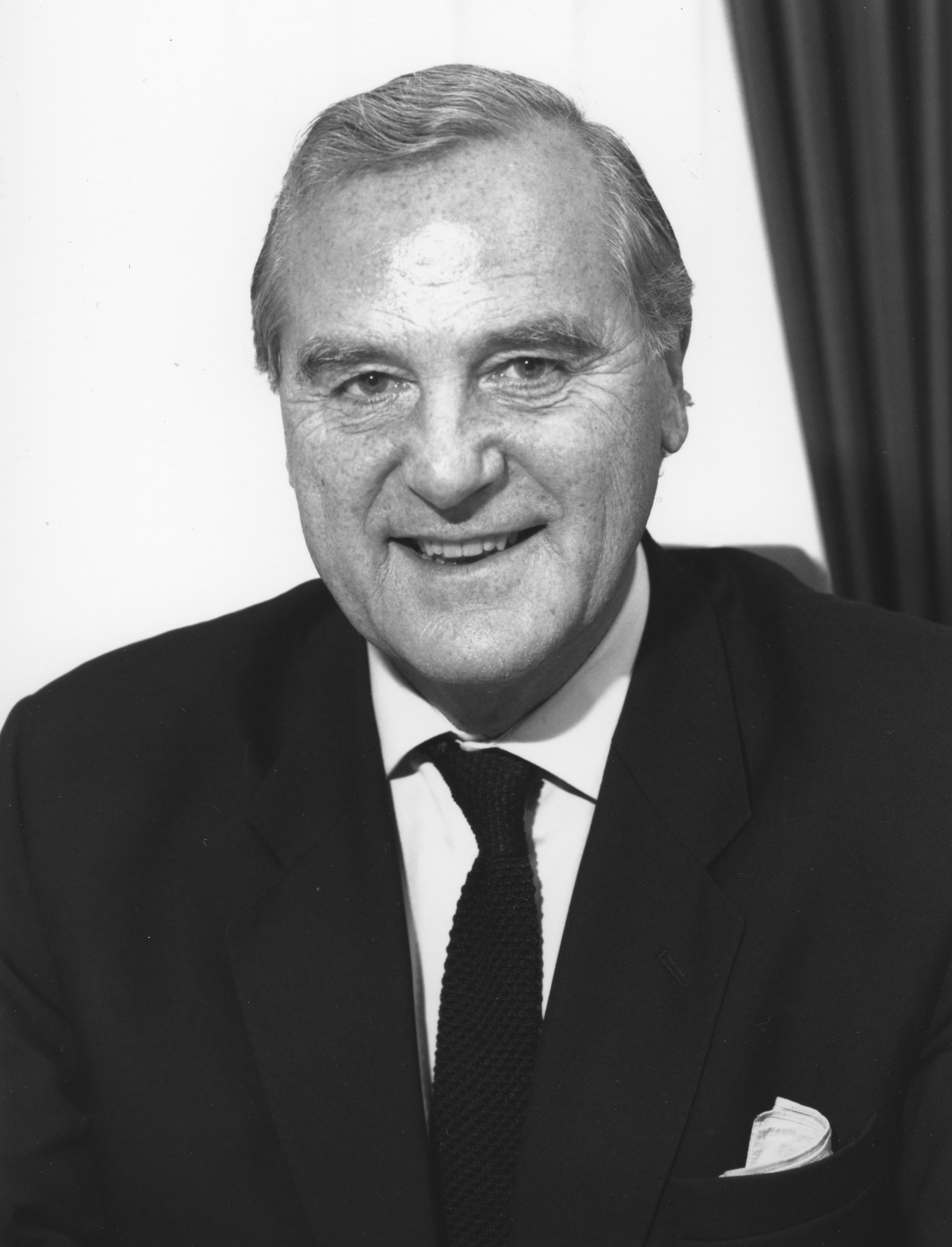
- Sir John Morgan, c. 1980

British Ambassador to Mexico
- In office 1986–1989
- Preceded by: Sir Kenneth James
- Succeeded by: Sir Michael Simpson-Orlebar

British Ambassador to Poland
- In office 1983–1986
- Preceded by: Sir Kenneth James
- Succeeded by: Sir Brian Barder

British Ambassador to South Korea
- In office 1980–1983
- Preceded by: William Bates
- Succeeded by: Nicholas Spreckley

Personal details
- Born: John Albert Leigh Morgan; 21 June 1929
- Died: 24 June 2012 (aged 83)
- Spouse(s): Hon. Fionn O'Neill (m. 1961; div. 1975) Angela Rathbone (m. 1976; died 2012)
- Relations: Fred Again (grandson)
- Children: 5
- Parent: John Edward Roland Morgan

Sir John Albert Leigh Morgan KCMG (21 June 1929 – 24 June 2012) was a British diplomat who served as ambassador to South Korea, Poland and Mexico.

== Early life ==
Morgan was born on 21 June 1929, the son of John Edward Roland Morgan, of Wylde Green, Warwickshire.

He was educated at Chingford County High School and the London School of Economics.

== Career ==
He served as First secretary of the Foreign Office. He was head of the Far Eastern Department, Foreign and Commonwealth Office from 1970 to 1972; and head of Cultural Relations Department, Foreign and Commonwealth Office from 1972 to 1980.

His foreign postings included: third secretary to Moscow from 1953 to 1956; at the unstable time of Stalin's death; second secretary to Peking, serving from 1956 to 1958. From 1963 to 1964, he was first secretary to Rio de Janeiro. His senior positions included first secretary and cultural attaché to Moscow from 1965 to 1967; Ambassador to South Korea from 1980 to 1983, and Ambassador to Poland from 1983 to 1986, and Ambassador to Mexico from 1986 to 1989.

Morgan was appointed Companion of the Order of St Michael and St George in 1982 and Knight Commander of the Order of St Michael and St George in 1989.

== Personal life ==
On 26 July 1961, Morgan married The Hon. Fionn Frances Bride O'Neill (b. 1936), the only daughter of Ann Fleming née Charteris and, her first husband, Shane O'Neill, 3rd Baron O'Neill. At the time of their wedding, Ann was married to her third husband, James Bond author Ian Fleming. Before they divorced in 1975, John and Fiona were the parents of three children:

- Mary Ann Frances Morgan (b. 1962), who married barrister Charles Anthony Warneford Gibson, son of G/Capt. Phillip G. Gibson (members of the Huntingdonshire gentry), in 1989.
- John Edward Rustand Morgan (b. 1964), who married Natasha Clare MacDonnell, daughter of Robert Myles Randal MacDonnell and Elizabeth Clare Newman, in 1996.
- Catherine Martha Annabel Morgan (b. 1966)

After their divorce, he married Angela Mary Eleanor Rathbone in 1976, with whom he had another son and daughter. Lady Morgan has served as President of Greenbank since 2002, inheriting the position from her uncle, Dr. B. L. Rathbone. She is also the grandniece of Eleanor Rathbone, the campaigner for family allowance and for women's rights and MP for Combined English Universities.

Sir John died on 24 June 2012.

=== Descendants ===
Through his daughter Mary Ann, he was a grandfather of Frederick John Philip Gibson (b. 1993), the English record producer, singer, songwriter.
