= Ian Clayton Mackenzie =

British diplomat

- Born: 13 January 1909
- Died: 17 October 2009 (aged 100)
- Occupation: British diplomat

Ian Clayton Mackenzie, CBE (13 January 1909 – 17 October 2009) was a British diplomat.

== Biography ==
Born on 13 January 1909, Ian Mackenzie was educated at Bedford School and at King's College, Cambridge. After joining the British Diplomatic Service he served in diplomatic postings in China, Belgian Congo, Chile, Norway, Venezuela and Sweden, before serving as British Ambassador to South Korea between 1967 and 1969. Ian Mackenzie died on 17 October 2009.

Diplomatic posts
Preceded by Sir Walter Godfrey	British Ambassador to South Korea; 1967–1969	Succeeded by Sir Nigel Trench, 7th Baron Ashtown
