= Derek A. Macaulay =

Canadian Forces officer

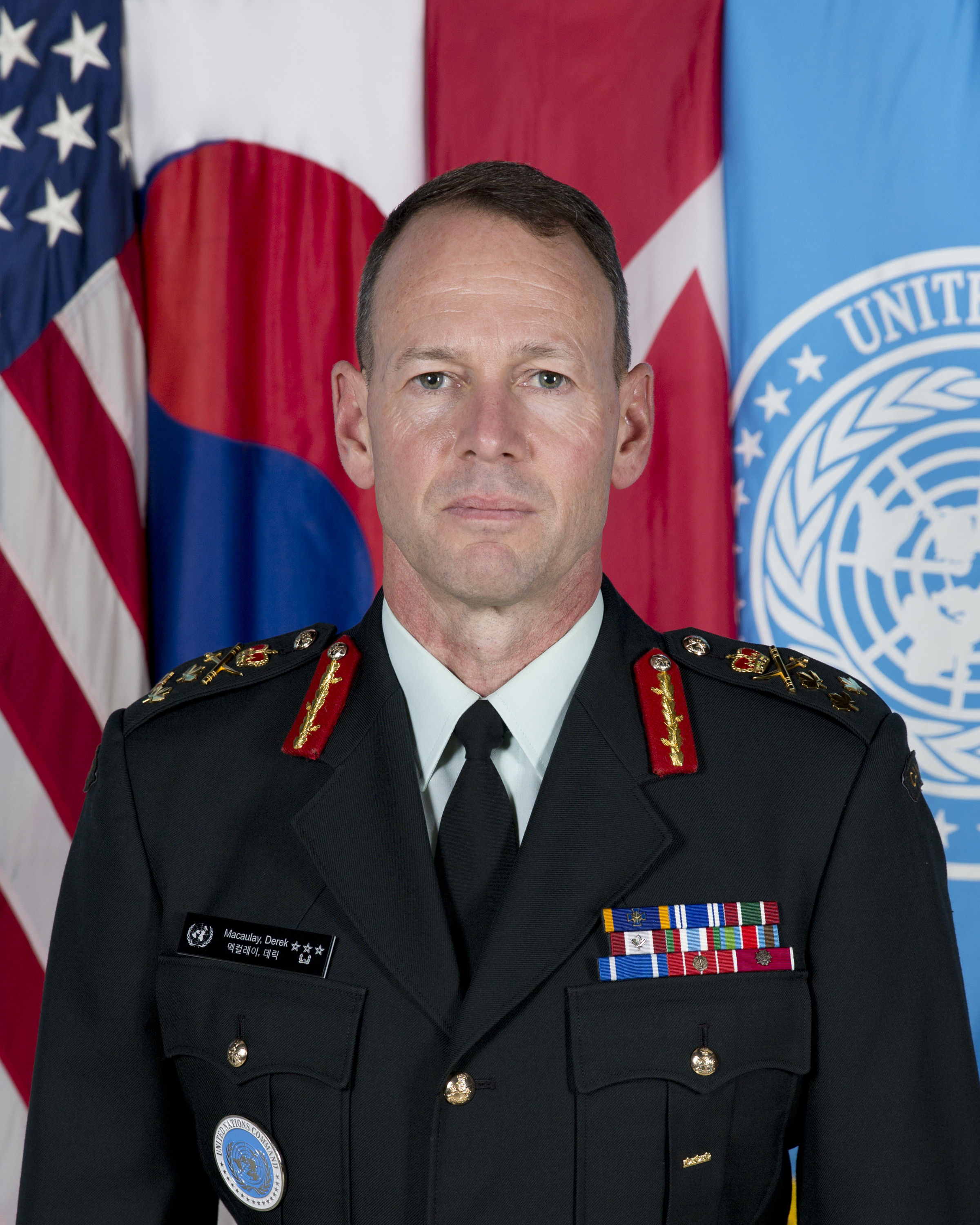
- Military career
- Allegiance: Canada
- Branch: Canadian Army
- Service years: 1989–present
- Rank: Lieutenant-general
- Commands: Deputy Commander United Nations Command; 5th Canadian Division; Lord Strathcona's Horse (Royal Canadians)
- Conflicts: United Nations Protection Force; Stabilisation Force in Bosnia and Herzegovina; War against the Islamic State
- Awards: Commander of the Order of Military Merit; Meritorious Service Cross; Canadian Forces' Decoration; Officer of the Legion of Merit (United States)

Derek Allen Macaulay, CMM, MSM, CD is a Canadian Forces officer serving as a lieutenant-general in the Canadian Army.

== Military career ==
Macaulay joined the Canadian Forces as part of the Officer Candidate Training Program in 1989 and was commissioned as an armoured officer in the Lord Strathcona's Horse (Royal Canadians). He served as chief of staff of the Combined Joint Forces Land Component Command Iraq from April 2015 to March 2016, and then became commander of 5th Canadian Division in May 2017. Macaulay was awarded a Meritorious Service Decoration following his tenure in Iraq in 2015/16. He was appointed the deputy commander of the Canadian Army on July 5, 2019, and was acting commander of the Canadian Army and chief of the Army Staff after Wayne Eyre was designated as acting chief of the Defense Staff from 24 February 2021 to 19 April 2021. Major General Michel-Henri St-Louis succeeded him in the role.

Macaulay served as deputy commander of United Nations Command from December 2023 until January 2026. He is the second Canadian general to serve deputy commander of the United Nations Command.

Military offices
| Preceded by Lieutenant General Andrew Harrison | Deputy Commander, United Nations Command; 2023–present | Incumbent |
