= Ela Lee =

British author and former litigation lawyer

- Born: 1995
- Education: University of Oxford
- Occupations: Author and former litigation lawyer
- Years active: 2022–present
- Website: www.elalee.co.uk

Ela Lee (born 1995) is a British author and former litigation lawyer. She is known for her debut novel Jaded (2024). In 2025, Lee was named a Forbes 30 Under 30.

== Early life ==
Ela Lee was born to a Turkish father and a Korean mother who had moved to England in their 20s and 30s respectively and grew up in South London. At the age of nine, Lee became a British citizen. She graduated from the University of Oxford.

== Career ==
Before becoming a writer, Lee began her career working as a litigator.

In 2022, Lee secured a two-book deal with Harvill Secker. Her debut novel Jaded was published in 2024 to a positive critical reception. Written during the COVID-19 lockdowns, the novel is loosely based on her own experiences, with the lead character Jade (Ceyda) Kaya (Kayaoğlu) being a City lawyer of Korean and Turkish descent, as well as the experiences of her friends and colleagues in the workplace. Jaded was shortlisted for Amazon Books UK's Fiction Book of the Year.

In 2024, Lee was working on her second novel. She reunited with Harvill Secker for the publication of her second novel Minbak in 2026. The novel charts dual timelines between 1985 Incheon and post-2008 financial crash London.

== Personal life ==
Lee has a husband.

== Bibliography ==
- Jaded. London: Harvill Secker. 2024.
- Minbak (2026)
