= Edeline Lee =

Canadian British fashion designer

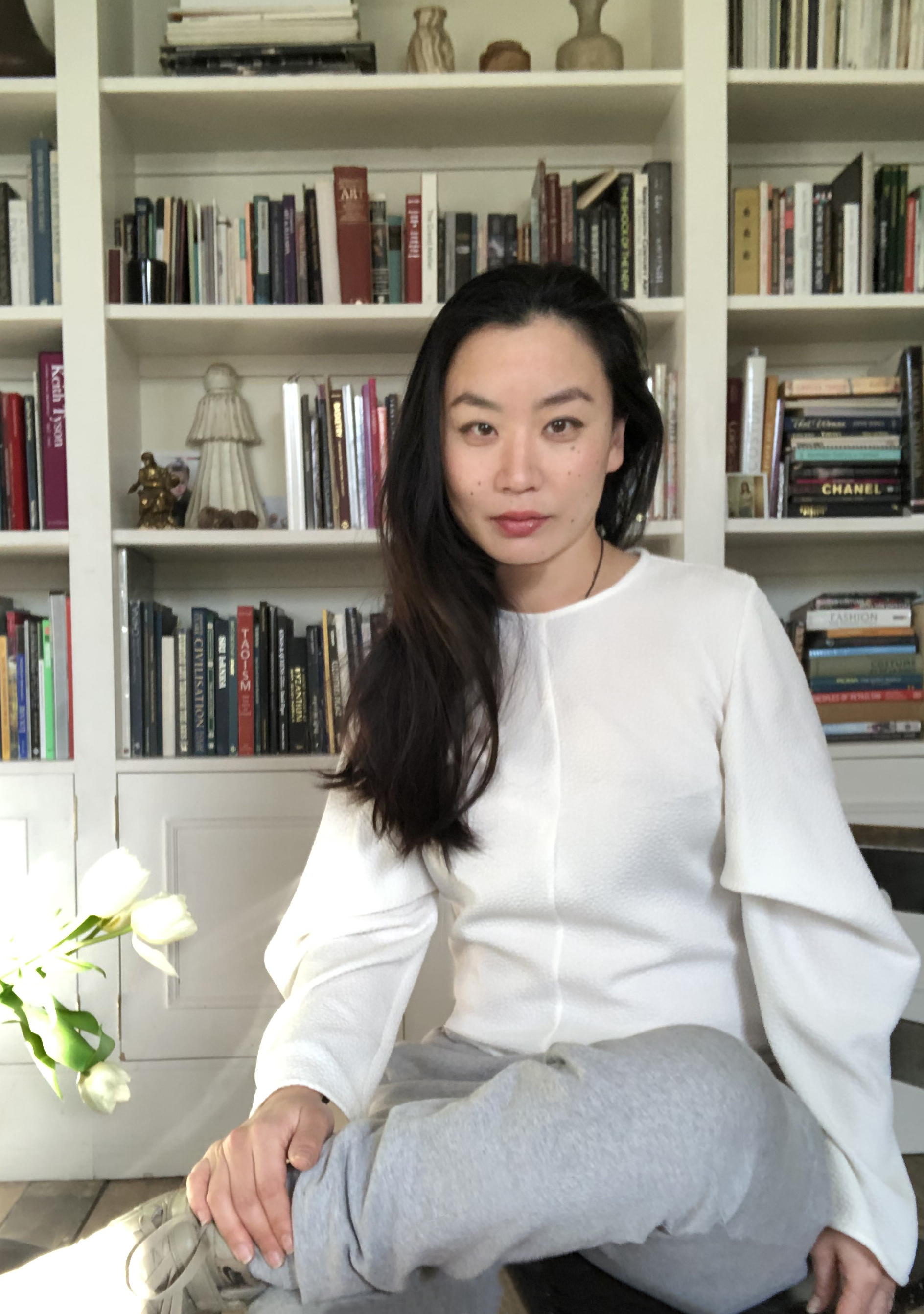
- Born: Vancouver, British Columbia, Canada
- Education: McGill University, Central Saint Martins
- Occupation: Fashion designer
- Known for: Edeline Lee womenswear label
- Website: https://edelinelee.com

Edeline Lee is a London-based, Canadian-British fashion designer of Korean descent. She established her eponymous womenswear label, which made its official London Fashion Week debut with its spring 2016 collection. In 2017, she received a grant from the British Fashion Council's Fashion Trust.

== Early life and education ==
Edeline Lee was born and raised in Vancouver, British Columbia, Canada. She completed a Bachelor of Arts degree with Joint Honours in sociology and East Asian studies at McGill University. She later graduated from Central Saint Martins with a first-class BA in Womenswear Fashion Design.

During a break from her studies, Lee apprenticed with Alexander McQueen in London and John Galliano in Paris. She also worked at Connock & Lockie, a London bespoke tailoring firm. In 2004, Lee left Central Saint Martins to work as associate creative director for Zac Posen in New York. She returned to Central Saint Martins to finish her degree and then worked as Head Designer for Rodnik in London.

== Career ==
In 2011, Lee was commissioned by jeweller Cora Sheibani to design a collection of dresses to display Sheibani's jewellery. The commission led to private orders and the establishment of Lee's eponymous fashion label. In September 2012, Hamish Bowles covered Lee's Spring 2013 collection for Vogue. In September 2015, Lee presented her spring 2016 collection, marking her debut on the official London Fashion Week schedule.

By 2018, Lee had begun incorporating theatrical performances into her London Fashion Week presentations, including contemporary dance. In February 2019, she staged a presentation featuring speeches by women from the arts, science and public life, including historian Mary Beard. Later that year, she collaborated with actress and writer Sharon Horgan on theatrical scenes for her spring 2020 collection. In February 2020, she worked with theatre director Josie Rourke on a presentation at the Apollo Theatre in London's West End.

During the COVID-19 pandemic, Lee developed digital presentations for her collections. Her spring 2022 collection incorporated 53 colours using leftover fabrics from her studio. The label also opened its first physical retail space at Harrods in London. In February 2023, Lee presented her autumn 2023 collection through an immersive event in Burlington Arcade and the surrounding Cork Street area, in collaboration with filmmaker Zeina Durra.

By 2024, Lee had established her own production unit in Limehouse, east London, after the closure of a factory she had previously used. She also staged her first catwalk show at London Fashion Week in September 2024, presenting her spring 2025 collection. In September 2025, Lee presented her spring 2026 collection in a traditional runway show that included a new knitwear range. The following February, she marked the label's 15th anniversary with a book documenting its collections and collaborators, launched during London Fashion Week. Her spring 2027 collection, presented in September 2026, drew inspiration from ballet and explored the work involved in staging a fashion show.

== Recognition ==
Year	Award or programme	Result	Ref.
2014	Centre for Fashion Enterprise; New Fashion Pioneer programme	Selected	
By 2015	Samsung Fashion & Design Fund.	Two-time Finalist	
2016	WGSN Fashion Futures Award; Breakthrough Womenswear Designer of the Year	Nominated	
2017	British Fashion Council Fashion Trust	Grant recipient	
2017	Les Étoiles Mercedes Benz	Finalist	
2025	BFC/Vogue Designer Fashion Fund	Shortlisted	
2025	British Fashion Council Fashion Trust	Grant recipient	
