= European Union–South Korea Free Trade Agreement =

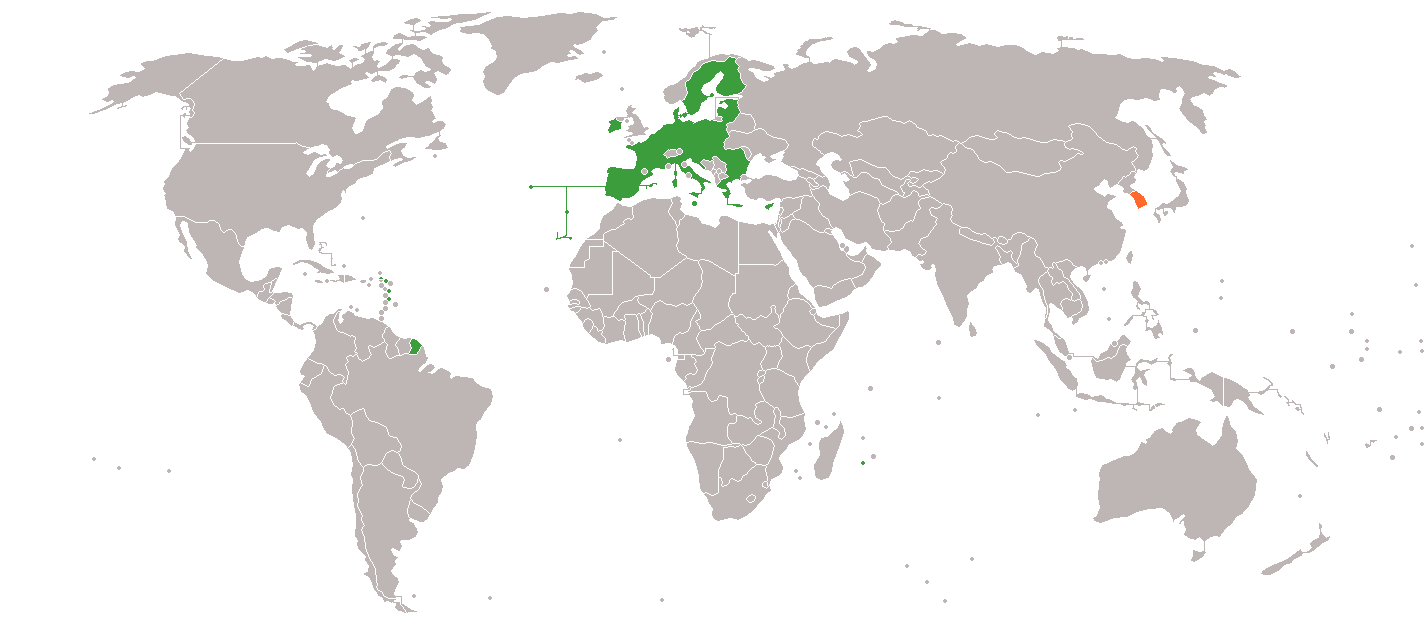
- South Korea (orange) and the European Union (green)
- Type: Trade agreement
- Signed: 6 October 2010
- Location: Brussels, Belgium
- Effective: 13 December 2015
- Condition: Ratification by all signatories
- Provisional application: 1 July 2011
- Signatories: South Korea; European Union; All 27 EU member states
- Ratifiers: 30 (South Korea, the EU and its 27 member states
- Languages: Korean All 24 official EU languages: Bulgarian; Croatian; Czech; Danish; Dutch; English; Estonian; Finnish; French; German; Greek; Hungarian; Irish; Italian; Latvian; Lithuanian; Maltese; Polish; Portuguese; Romanian; Slovak; Slovene; Spanish; Swedish

The European Union–South Korea Free Trade Agreement is a free trade agreement between the European Union (EU) and South Korea. The agreement was signed on 15 October 2009. The agreement was provisionally applied from 1 July 2011, and entered into force from 13 December 2015, after having been ratified by all signatories.

The agreement was the most comprehensive the EU had ever negotiated up until that point: import duties are near eliminated on all produce and there is deep liberalisation in trade in services. It includes provisions for intellectual property (including geographical indications), public procurement, competition, transparency of regulation and sustainable development. There are also specific commitments against non-tariff obstacles on sectors such as automobiles, pharmaceuticals and electronics.

== Background ==
This is the third trade related agreement that South Korea and the European Union have signed between themselves. The first, the Agreement on Co-operation and Mutual Administrative Assistance in Customs Matters was signed on 13 May 1997. This agreement allows the sharing of competition policy between the two parties. The second agreement, the Framework Agreement on Trade and Co-operation, was enacted on 1 April 2001. The framework attempts to increase co-operation on several industries, including transport, energy, science and technology, industry, environment and culture.

Trade between the two parties was €64 billion in 2007. The EU is the second largest importer of South Korean goods. South Korea is the eighth largest importer of EU goods. The agreement is commonly referred to as the first of the next generation FTAs signed by the EU that addresses trade concerns beyond tariffs. Chief among these concerns are non-tariff barriers (NTBs); they are significant barriers to trade both in Korea and the EU. In fact, NTBs have been estimated to have the same protection level as a tariff at 76 percent in Korea and 46 percent in the EU. According to some studies, an agreement can increase trade as much as 40% over the long term.

== Negotiations and opposition ==
Negotiations started in May 2007 and were expected to be completed in March 2009; however, several issues had to be resolved before the agreement could be finished. Seven rounds of negotiations over various aspects of the agreements were completed which addressed problems over several issues including rules of origin, auto trade issues, and allowing certain tariff reductions.

Italian and some French automakers believe this agreement would significantly harm them by allowing South Korean automakers to compete against them in the EU. Adolfo Urso, a junior Italian minister for external trade, said that the Italian government may veto the agreement based on the European automakers concerns, which it initially did in September 2010. Trade analysts like Hosuk Lee-Makiyama of ECIPE have rejected the lobbying of the car industry as "myths": while EU exports to Korea are estimated to increase by 400%, most Asian car brands manufacture their cars in the EU and Korean cars account for insignificant share of imports to the EU to threaten even the most inefficient car producers in Europe. Italy dropped its objections in return for the provisional application of the agreement being postponed from 1 January 2011 to 1 July 2011.

The agreement eliminates tariffs on 98% of import duties and trade barriers in manufactured goods, agricultural products and services over a period of five years. It includes a guarantee that South Korean regulation on car emissions will not be disadvantageous to European car manufacturers, and includes a clause to guard European car manufacturers.

South Korea has had significant opposition to previous free trade agreements most especially with the United States. This EU agreement is larger than the United States agreement. However, Hur Kyung-wook, Vice Finance Minister for South Korea, has said that he believes the agreement will go into effect in July 2010. On 22 March 2011, the citizen group called Lawyers for Democratic Society (민주사회를 위한 변호사모임) announced that there were 160 cases of mistranslation errors in the Korean version of the document.

The text of the agreement was initialled between South Korea and the EU on 15 October 2009. It was signed on 6 October 2010, at the EU-Korea Summit in Brussels. The European Parliament ratified the agreement on 17 February 2011. South Korea's legislature ratified the agreement on 4 May 2011.

== Effects ==
In 2016, five years after the European Union–South Korea Free Trade Agreement has been provisionally put in place, the European Commission announced that EU exports to South Korea increased by 55%; European companies saved €2.8 billion in scrapped or discounted customs duties; and bilateral trade in goods between the EU and South Korea grew annually, reaching a record level of over €90 billion in 2015.

In the United Kingdom, Lord Price CVO, Minister of State for Trade Policy, Department for International Trade (DIT), said that the EU-Korea FTA had boosted UK exports to Korea by 111% from 2010/11 to 2014/15.

== Dispute about capital punishment ==
The topic causing most conflict involving the EU-ROK FTA is the abolition of capital punishment. Although South Korea currently has a moratorium on/de facto abolition of the death penalty, it is not a de jure abolition - even the Constitutional Court of Korea ruled that capital punishment is not unconstitutional in 2010. While the EU criticizes South Korean government for not fully abolishing capital punishment, according to various public surveys, many respondents in South Korea opposed the EU's request to abolish the death penalty due to its desired need to give admonition to heinous criminals. For example, in one public survey conducted by Gallup Korea on September 13–14, 2021, 77.3% of the participants answered that capital punishment should be used. Therefore, some people in Korea consider the EU's act as interference to internal affairs. Also, the European Union's other acts contradict their criticism toward the South Korean government, since the EU signed a free trade agreement with Vietnam and Singapore, where they retain capital punishment. Currently, the European Union has not given any explanations regarding this contradiction.

== Dispute about labour rights ==
In 2021, a Panel of Experts determined that South Korea did not respect all its labour rights obligations under the European-Union-South Korea Free Trade Agreement. In particular, the Panel made recommendations regarding the freedom of association and the effective recognition of collective bargaining.

== See also ==
- Free trade agreements of South Korea
- Free trade agreements of the European Union
- Free trade agreements of the United Kingdom
- Foreign relations of South Korea
- Foreign relations of the European Union
- Foreign relations of the United Kingdom
- List of bilateral free trade agreements
- South Korea–United Kingdom Free Trade Agreement
