= Jean-Baptiste Kim =

Korean activist and writer

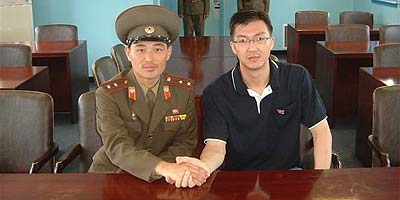
Jean-Baptiste Kim (right)

Jean-Baptiste Kim (born 26 January 1966) is a political defector-refugee from South Korea in Europe.

He was born in South Korea which he fled as a teenager following incarceration and torture against him and his family members by the South Korean authorities leading to the death of his father. (His father was a political activist of the then-military dictatorship in South Korea.)

After becoming a French citizen he was opened to North Korean connections in Europe by meeting a North Korean agent Oon Yung. This led to his political defection from South Korea to North Korea, becoming an associate of Kim Jong Il whom he met and says was like a father figure for him. He actively worked for the North Korean authorities for 11 years, visiting Pyongyang several times. He served time as a foreign correspondent of Rodong Sinmun.

In 2007, he announced his dissociation with Pyongyang and that he is no longer working for the North Korean state. This led to the cancellation of the Rock for Peace Festival that he was in the middle of organising in which a Norwegian rock band among others was to perform in Pyongyang. Following his resignation, he became a mobile phone salesman in New Malden, Surrey.
