= Vyvyan Holt =

British soldier, diplomat and Oriental scholar

Sir Vyvyan Holt
- Born: 1896; London, England
- Died: 2 July 1960 (aged 63–64); Norwich, Norfolk
- Occupations: Soldier and diplomat
- Awards: Royal Victorian Order 4th Class (1933); Order of St Michael and St George (1939); Order of the British Empire (1955)
- Military career
- Allegiance: United Kingdom
- Branch: British Army
- Service years: 1914–1918
- Rank: Captain
- Unit: The Duke of Cambridge's Own (Middlesex Regiment)
- Conflicts: World War I

Captain Sir Vyvyan Holt KBE CMG MVO (1896 – 2 July 1960) was a British soldier, diplomat, and Oriental scholar, who was held captive by North Korea for nearly three years during the Korean War.

== Biography ==
Born in London in 1896, the son of Teresa and Arthur Ernest Holt, he joined the diplomatic service after studying at university. Holt was commissioned as a second lieutenant in the 9th Battalion, The Duke of Cambridge's Own (Middlesex Regiment) on 22 April 1914, gaining promotion to Lieutenant on 29 October 1914. After serving in India during World War I, he joined the Iraq Civil Administration in 1919 as an Assistant Political Officer in Sulaimani. During his time in the Kurdish areas of Iraq he learned Kurdish and founded the first Kurdish-language newspaper. He was appointed Oriental Secretary in 1926, a position which he held until 1944. Partway through his time in Iraq he transferred to the Levant Consular Service. Holt also served as British representative to the Mandates Commission of the League of Nations.

In 1930, while serving with the British Embassy in Baghdad, the tall and soldierly Holt was noticed by Freya Stark, who pinned her romantic hopes on him until he rejected her declaration of love. (Note: With respect to Holt's sexuality, Geniesse writes: There were some old colonial hands who wondered if Holt might be homosexual−he never married and could easily have been attracted to Arab bisexuality. Yet there is no available confirmation of this, and it is possible his extreme discipline extended to sex. In any event, Captain Holt came to consider Freya a close friend... Geniesse, Jane Fletcher (2000). Freya Stark - Passionate Nomad. Pimlico. p. 99. ISBN 9780712667548.) However, the two continued to correspond until just before his death.

In June 1933, following the visit of King Faisal I of Iraq to London, Holt was made a member of the Royal Victorian Order (4th Class). In 1939 he was made a Companion of the Order of St Michael and St George (CMG) for his service as Oriental Secretary at the British Embassy in Baghdad.

The Embassy's official press release issued on his departure from Iraq in 1944 described him as, "A man of great versatility for all his retiring temperament – Captain Holt is, among other things a keen horseman and polo-player and an authority on Bernard Shaw, and Ibsen."

After leaving Iraq Holt spent a brief period at the Foreign Office and he was then appointed Oriental Counsellor to Tehran in December 1945.

=== Korean War ===
At the time of the Korean War Holt was the British Minister in Seoul. He had been appointed Consul-General to Republic of Korea on 19 May 1948, replacing Derwent Kermode, and was also appointed Envoy Extraordinary and Minister Plenipotentiary on 17 March 1949.

At the outbreak of the Korean War, Holt did not leave the country. He thought it was his duty to remain and mistakenly believed that his diplomatic immunity would protect him. Instead, in July 1950, Holt with members of his staff including his subordinates George Blake and Norman Owen and other foreigners were detained by the North Koreans and taken on a death march to the far north of the peninsula. Questions were asked in Parliament about his disappearance. In early 1953 it was confirmed that Holt had survived and he was released in April 1953 with six other civilian captives.

Holt's fellow captive, Monsignor Thomas Quinlan, Prefect Apostolic of Chunchon in Korea, said on his release;

"I wish formally to place on record the courage, heroism and kindness of Capt. Vyvyan Holt, the British Minister in Seoul. Time and again during captivity he fought my case with the Koreans, declaring that not only was I a priest of God, but an Irish citizen, and 'Ireland wasn't in this shindy,' but the Koreans would not listen."

Pathé News filmed their return to the United Kingdom.

During his captivity Holt, in one historian's account, had "endured harsh treatment during which nothing was heard of him until the Foreign Office eventually used Russian good offices to secure his repatriation." According to another historian:

"George Blake... found his boss, Captain Vyvyan Holt ... a man of great charm, but also something of an eccentric and an ascetic, preferring boiled vegetables, fruit and curds to what he disdainfully dismissed as 'hot meals.' ... Equally eccentric, perhaps, was the King's Birthday Party in June 1950, which, despite the pouring rain, Holt insisted on holding on the lawns, where he greeted his guests in gumboots and umbrella, rather than risk having people being sick over his furniture."

=== After release ===
On 23 December 1953, Holt was appointed Envoy Extraordinary and Minister Plenipotentiary at San Salvador, and Consul-General for the Republic of El Salvador on 16 January 1954. In May 1956 he was made a Knight Commander of the Order of the British Empire.

He was a Member of the Royal Central Asian Society from 1922 until his death.

=== Death ===
His health deteriorated heavily due to his treatment during his Korean captivity. Holt died in 1960 in Norwich in Norfolk.
