= Biocompatibles =

British medical technology company

Biocompatibles plc
- Type: Public company
- Traded as: LSE: BII
- Industry: Pharmaceutical industry
- Founded: 1984
- Headquarters: Farnham, UK
- Key people: Gerry Brown (Chairman of the board)
- Products: Drug Eluting Beads
- Revenue: £9.1 million (2007)
- Operating income: ▲£6.9 million (2007)
- Net income: ▼£6.2 million (2007)
- Number of employees: 89 (2007)
- Website: www.biocompatibles.com

Biocompatibles International plc was a medical technology company in the field of drug-device combination products. It was acquired by BTG plc in 2010, which was, in turn, acquired by Boston Scientific in 2019.

Approved oncology products were supplied and marketed from facilities in Farnham, Surrey, UK and Oxford, Connecticut.

Products included drug-eluting bead products that are used in more than 35 countries for the treatment of primary liver cancer (HCC), liver metastases from colorectal cancer and other cancers. The company supplied and marketed brachytherapy products (radiation-delivering seeds) that are used to treat prostate cancer.

Its UK research and development facilities were engaged in licensing and in new product development based on the company's core drug delivery technologies in the treatment of cancers.

Its Cellmed unit in Alzenau, Germany, was developing a drug-eluting bead product for the treatment of stroke based on proprietary stem cell technology. Cellmed was also developing a GLP-1 analogue for the treatment of diabetes and obesity partnered with AstraZeneca.

Biocompatibles had collaborative agreements with Bayer HealthCare Pharmaceuticals Inc., Medtronic Inc. and Merz Pharma.

== History ==
In the 1970s Dennis Chapman (1927–1999) at London's Royal Free Hospital. Chapman and his colleagues were responsible for groundbreaking research in the area of biocompatibility – the ability of a material to interface within the body without provoking an adverse biological response. They identified phosphoryl-choline (PC), a substance present in the human cell membrane, as one of the primary natural materials responsible for biocompatibility.

In 1984 Chapman founded Biocompatibles, which patented PC technology to develop it for commercial healthcare applications. In 2002, the company expanded to a new field based upon embolisation therapy, a minimally invasive treatment for tumors or vascular malformations based upon compressible PVA embolic microspheres.

Biocompatibles has been publicly traded on the London Stock Exchange since 1995 (LSE:BII).

In 2010, the company was acquired by BTG plc for about 156 million pounds.

In 2019, its new parent company BTG was acquired by Boston Scientific for around US$4.2 billion.

== The Technology ==
Biocompatibles has a patent portfolio defending three biomedical polymer systems.

- The NFil Technology licensed from the Biocure affiliate of Novartis' Ciba Vision subsidiary, which is used in the Drug-Eluting Beads programme;
- The CellMed alginate technology, CellBeads, which is required for the encapsulation of biological agents; and the PC technology that was the group's original platform;
- A variety of more product-specific drug delivery inventions for the delivery of both chemical and biological agents.

== Pharmaceutical products ==
Research and products are centered on the controlled and accurate delivery of drugs to patients with certain forms of cancer or vascular problems. Research is focused on the use of drug-eluting beads, which can be accurately delivered to the point of need. Once metabolized, these beads release the prescribed drug at a pre-determined rate.
