= Andrew Harrison (British Army officer) =

Retired British Army officer

Lieutenant General Andrew Harrison DSO MBE
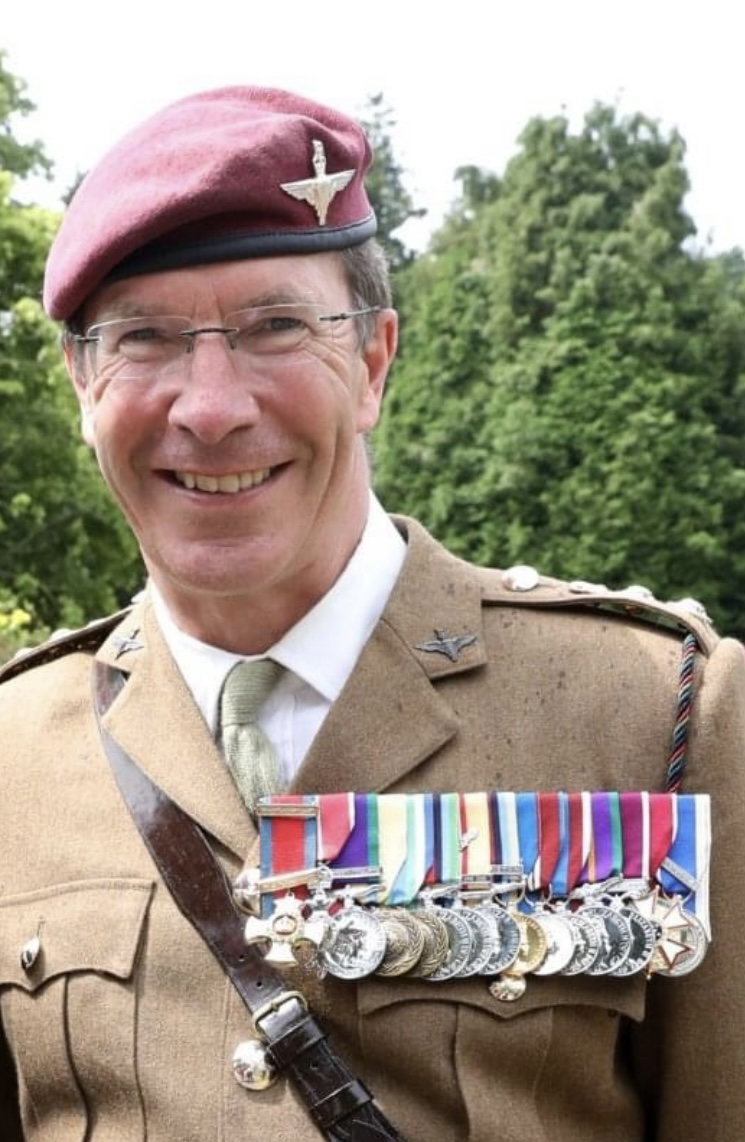
- Harrison at Aldershot Military Cemetery in 2022
- Born: January 1967 (age 59)
- Military career
- Allegiance: United Kingdom
- Branch: British Army
- Service years: 1987–2024
- Rank: Lieutenant general
- Service number: 527291
- Commands: Deputy Commander, United Nations Command; 2nd Battalion, Parachute Regiment
- Conflicts: The Troubles; United Nations Mission in Sierra Leone; Iraq War; War in Afghanistan
- Awards: Distinguished Service Order; Member of the Order of the British Empire; Queen's Commendation for Valuable Service; Officer of the Legion of Merit (United States); NATO Meritorious Service Medal

Lieutenant General Andrew Sean David Harrison, DSO, MBE (born January 1967) is a retired senior officer in the British Army who served as the deputy commander of United Nations Command in South Korea from 2021 to 2023.

== Early life ==
Harrison received his education in London, where he took a degree in economics. An officer cadet in the Territorial Army, he was commissioned a second lieutenant on 29 March 1987.

== Military career ==
Harrison joined the Parachute Regiment, from the Territorial Army, on 1 September 1989 as a university candidate on a short service commission. During the 1990s, Harrison served multiple tours in Northern Ireland and spent a year with the United Nations (UN) in Iraq, and took part in exchanges with 2/1 Royal New Zealand Infantry Regiment in Christchurch and 3rd Battalion, Royal Australian Regiment in Sydney. Harrison was an instructor at the Royal Military Academy Sandhurst and worked with the Directorate of Military Operations.

In 2000, Major Harrison was in Sierra Leone as an unarmed UN military observer. When civil war broke out, he was taken captive with 10 other observers by rebels from the Revolutionary United Front (RUF). He was held for twelve days before he managed to escape to a UN base at Kailahun, where 222 Indian troops of the United Nations Mission in Sierra Leone (UNAMSIL) peacekeeping operation were under siege to rebel forces. Harrison was rescued after about ten weeks in an UKSF/UN assault in which he and more than 200 other UN observers and soldiers were liberated by forces acting on directions from SAS teams and backed by Chinook helicopters. In 2002 he was appointed a Member of the Order of the British Empire "in recognition of his gallant and distinguished services" while held captive in Sierra Leone.

On completing a master's degree in defence administration at the Joint Staff College, Harrison gained command of a rifle company which in 2003 he led during the invasion of Iraq. As chief of staff of 20 Armoured Brigade, he returned to Basra in 2006. He received a Queen's Commendation for Valuable Service for service in Iraq.

In 2007, Harrison was responsible for organising the repatriation of the bodies of British service personnel from Iraq and Afghanistan in 68 ceremonies. He was appointed to the United Kingdom's Permanent Joint Headquarters, finishing this tour seconded to 3 Commando Brigade in Helmand in Afghanistan. Harrison was appointed to command the 2nd Battalion of the Parachute Regiment in 2009, returning to Helmand with his regiment in 2010, where he was wounded. In 2012 Lieutenant Colonel Harrison was awarded the Distinguished Service Order for his leadership in Afghanistan.

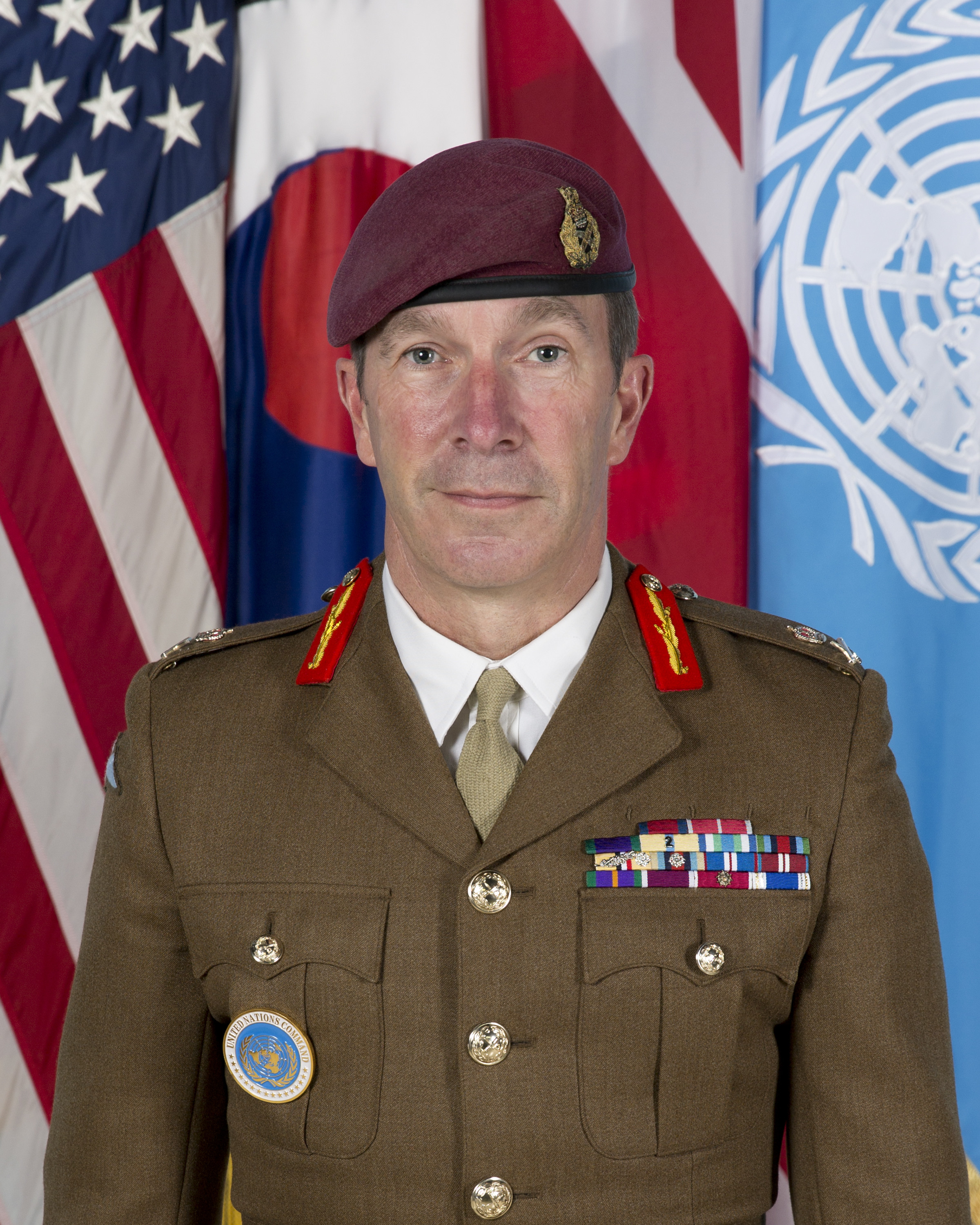
Official portrait of Lieutenant General Andrew Harrison, deputy commander, United Nations Command, Korea

On promotion to colonel, Harrison became the military lead in the team responsible for Afghanistan planning at the Ministry of Defence. In 2012 he attended the United Kingdom's Higher Command and Staff Course, following which he was promoted to brigadier and placed in charge of the Joint Fires and Influence in the Allied Rapid Reaction Corps, a NATO High Readiness Force (Land) Headquarters ready for deployment worldwide. In 2016 he completed a master's degree in politics and policy and completed the Defence and Strategic Studies Course at the Australian Defence College. He was appointed the United Kingdom's defence adviser in Canberra from 2017 to 2019. In October 2021, Major General Harrison was awarded the NATO Meritorious Service Medal by the secretary general of NATO. Harrison was promoted to lieutenant general on 15 December 2021 and appointed deputy commander of the United Nations Command in South Korea. He stepped down from the UN Command in December 2023, and retired from the army on 1 August 2024.

He was colonel commandant of the Parachute Regiment until September 2024.

== Personal life ==
In 1993, Harrison married Carolyn Annette Burns, a teacher and former army officer. The couple have three daughters. Harrison was vice president of the Army Winter Sports Association until 2015. His hobbies include cricket, skiing, cycling, running and military history.

Military offices
Preceded by Vice Admiral Stuart Mayer	Deputy Commander, United Nations Command; 2021–2023	Succeeded by Lieutenant-General Derek A. Macaulay
