= Su Scott =

South Korean food writer (born c. 1980)

- Born: c. 1980; Seoul, South Korea
- Spouse: Toby Scott
- Children: 1
- Culinary career
- Cooking style: Korean

Su Scott (born c. 1980) is a South Korean-born food writer based in London. Her recipe won an Observer Food Monthly (OFM) Award. She went on to publish the cookbooks Rice Table (2023) and Pocha (2024), which were shortlisted for Guild of Food Writers and Fortnum & Mason Food and Drink Awards respectively.

== Early life ==
Scott was born in Seoul and moved to London in 2000 shortly before turning 20. She initially lived with family friends.

== Career ==
Scott began her career writing a food blog and subsequently had a column for a Korean magazine. In 2019, Scott entered the Observer Food Monthly (OFM) Awards. Her kimchi jjigae recipe won the Best Reader's Recipe category.

In December 2022, Quadrille (a Penguin Random House UK imprint) acquired the rights to publish Scott's debut cookbook Rice Table: Korean Recipes and Stories to Feed the Soul in 2023. Scott described the book as "kind of me talking to my daughter" motivated by wanting to pass cultural and family recipes down to her. She also sought to highlight "everyday" Korean dishes and expand readers' general knowledge of Korean recipes and food traditions such as banchan, saying "When you talk about Korean food with other people, they talk about bulgogi and bibimbap. Of course, these are wonderful dishes that champion Korean cuisine, but they are only a fraction of what we offer". Rice Table was shortlisted for the First Book Award at the 2024 Guild of Food Writers (GFW) Awards and appeared on 2023 and 2024 cookbook lists by Harper's Bazaar and Delicious magazine.

This was followed by Scott's second cookbook Pocha: Simple Korean Food from the Streets of Seoul in 2024. The book is titled after and explores Pojangmacha street food culture. Pocha was shortlisted for at the 2025 Fortnum & Mason Food and Drink Awards.

== Personal life ==
Scott is married with a daughter (born 2015). Her husband is a food photographer.

== Bibliography ==
- Rice Table: Korean Recipes and Stories to Feed the Soul (2023)
- Pocha: Simple Korean Food from the Streets of Seoul (2024)
