= Pengiran Mokhtar Puteh =

Bruneian civil servant (1929–2016)

Yang Amat Mulia Pengiran Jaya Indera Pengiran Mokhtar Puteh DK DSNB DPMB PNB CVO PHBS PBLI PJK PKL
- ڤڠيرن مختار ڤوتيه
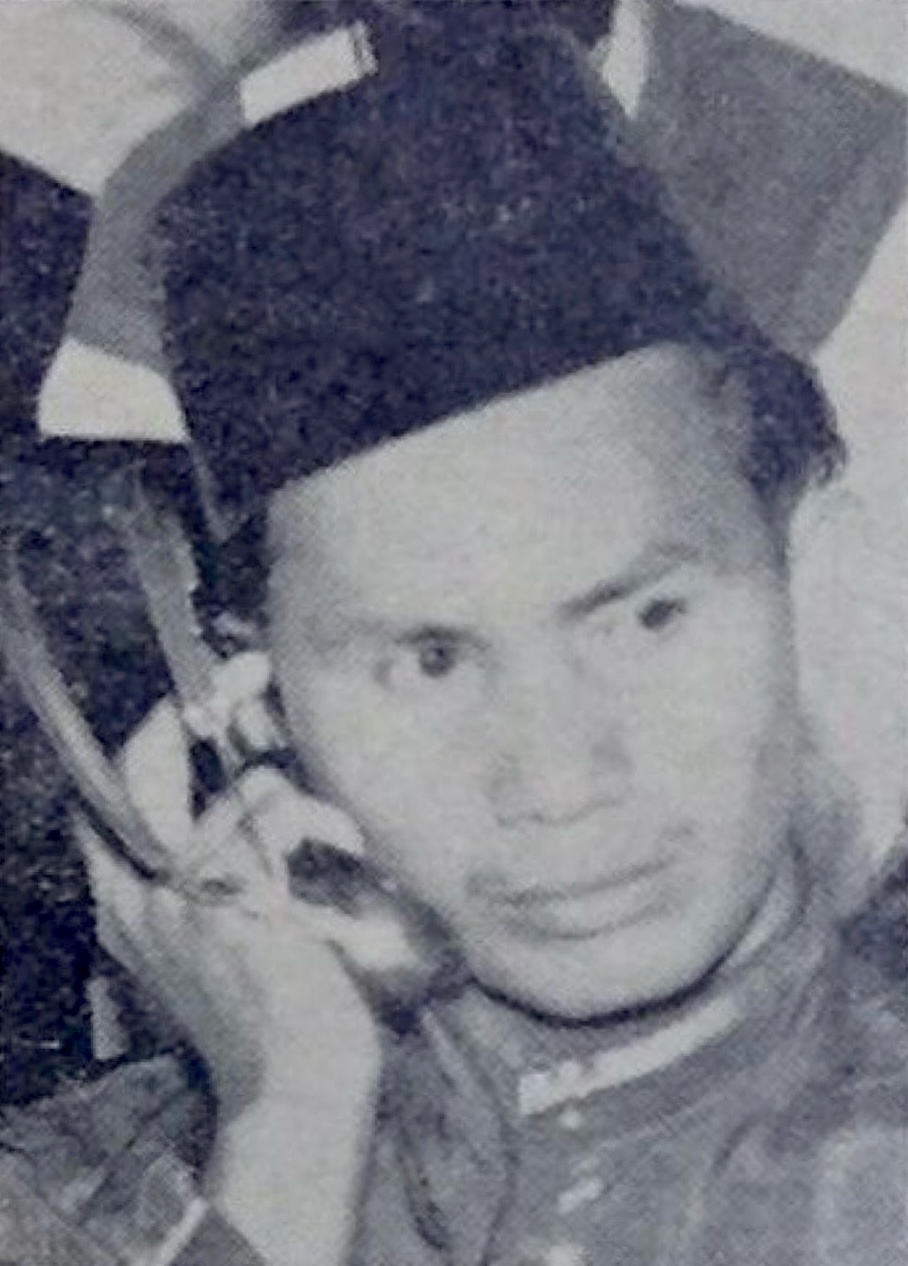
- Pengiran Mokhtar Puteh, c. 1961
- Born: 19 September 1929; Kampong Kianggeh, Brunei Town, Brunei
- Died: 30 April 2016 (aged 86); Raja Isteri Pengiran Anak Saleha Hospital, Bandar Seri Begawan, Brunei
- Burial place: Kampong Telanai Muslim Cemetery, Bandar Seri Begawan, Brunei
- Education: Roman Catholic Mission School
- Occupation: Civil servant
- Known for: Grand chamberlain for the royal household
- Relatives: Pengiran Jaya (brother); Pengiran Mohammed (uncle)

Pengiran Mokhtar Puteh bin Pengiran Rajid (Note: The alternate spelling of his given name is "Pengiran Puteh" or "Pengiran Mokhtar Putih" rather than "Pengiran Mokhtar Puteh.") (19 September 1929 – 30 April 2016) was a noble civil servant, renowned for his distinguished career spanning several decades. He held key positions, including serving as the grand chamberlain to the royal household from the 1960s to the 1990s, and was a member of the Privy Council. Additionally, he served as president of the Brunei Darussalam Pencak Silat Federation. Throughout his life, Pengiran Mokhtar Puteh was widely recognised for his involvement in athletics and charitable causes.

== Early life and education ==
Pengiran Mokhtar Puteh bin Pengiran Rajid was born on 19 September 1930 in Kampong Kianggeh, a village within Brunei Town, now known as Bandar Seri Begawan. His early education at the Kajang Malay School in Brunei Town from 1939 to 1942. He then continued his studies at the Roman Catholic Mission School, which later became St George's School. During the Japanese occupation of Brunei in 1941, he pursued further education at a designated naval academy in Sarawak.

== Career ==
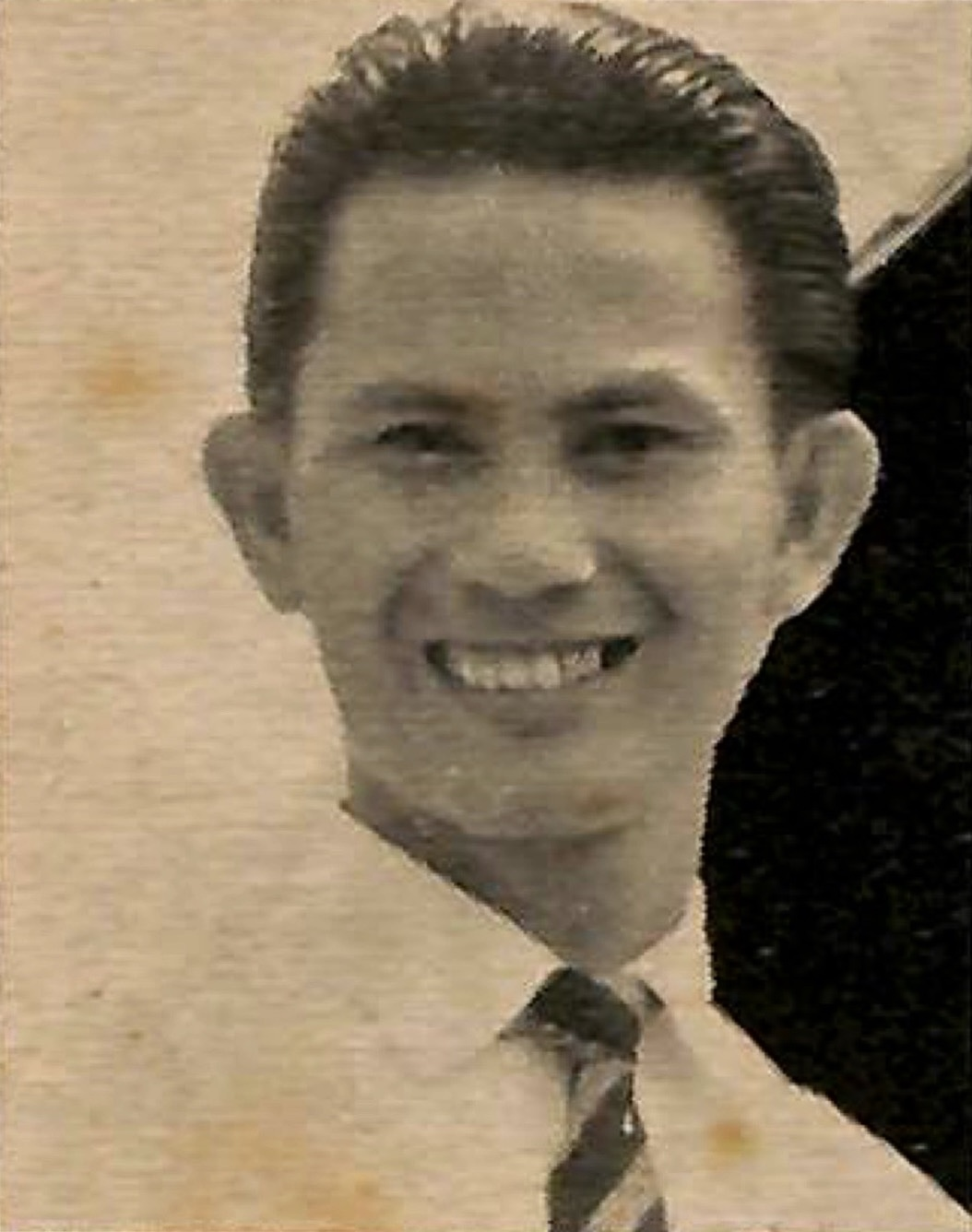
Pengiran Mokhtar Puteh, c. 1960

Pengiran Mokhtar Puteh started working for the Brunei–Muara District as a broadcast and information officer. As an assistant information officer in Brunei Town, he was transferred to Kuala Belait at the beginning of April 1957. On 30 September 1960, Pengiran Mokhtar Puteh was appointed president of the Brunei State Amateur Football Association. Later that year in March, he, the acting state information officer of Brunei, was appointed as the president of the Brunei Government Permanent Officers Association during its first annual general meeting.

On 1 January 1962, the Department of Information and Radio Brunei was merged into the newly formed Radio and Information Broadcasting Department, with Pengiran Mokhtar Puteh, the former assistant information officer, appointed as the acting officer-in-charge. Later that year, from 11 to 24 July, he and Salleh Masri attended the Youth Conference in Aarhus, Denmark, where an extended session for delegation leaders took place until 27 July to discuss upcoming youth programmes and seminars.

On 8 May 1968, Pengiran Mokhtar Puteh was named head of Adat Istiadat Negara in the royal household. A year later, during a Legislative Council meeting in May 1969, a proposal was put forward for the Brunei government to consult the British government regarding the future of the country's constitution. Pengiran Mokhtar Puteh, alongside Jamil Al-Sufri, deemed the proposal as too inappropriate to accept.

The desire for political participation by the BAKER party in the 1969 British–Bruneian discussions was swiftly rejected by Pengiran Mokhtar Puteh and Jamil Al-Sufri, who described it as "too absurd for consideration." They emphasised that political figures from the Legislative Council and District Councils should not be included in the discussions, which were solely between Sultan Hassanal Bolkiah and the British administration. On 15 July, to mark Sultan Hassanal Bolkiah's birthday, he officiated a ceremony at the palace, where 16 government employees were awarded the Pingat Indah Kerja Baik for their outstanding service. Later that year, in October, as a representative from the palace, Pengiran Mokhtar Puteh also denied the rumours regarding Prince Mohamed Bolkiah's engagement with a Johor royal family member.

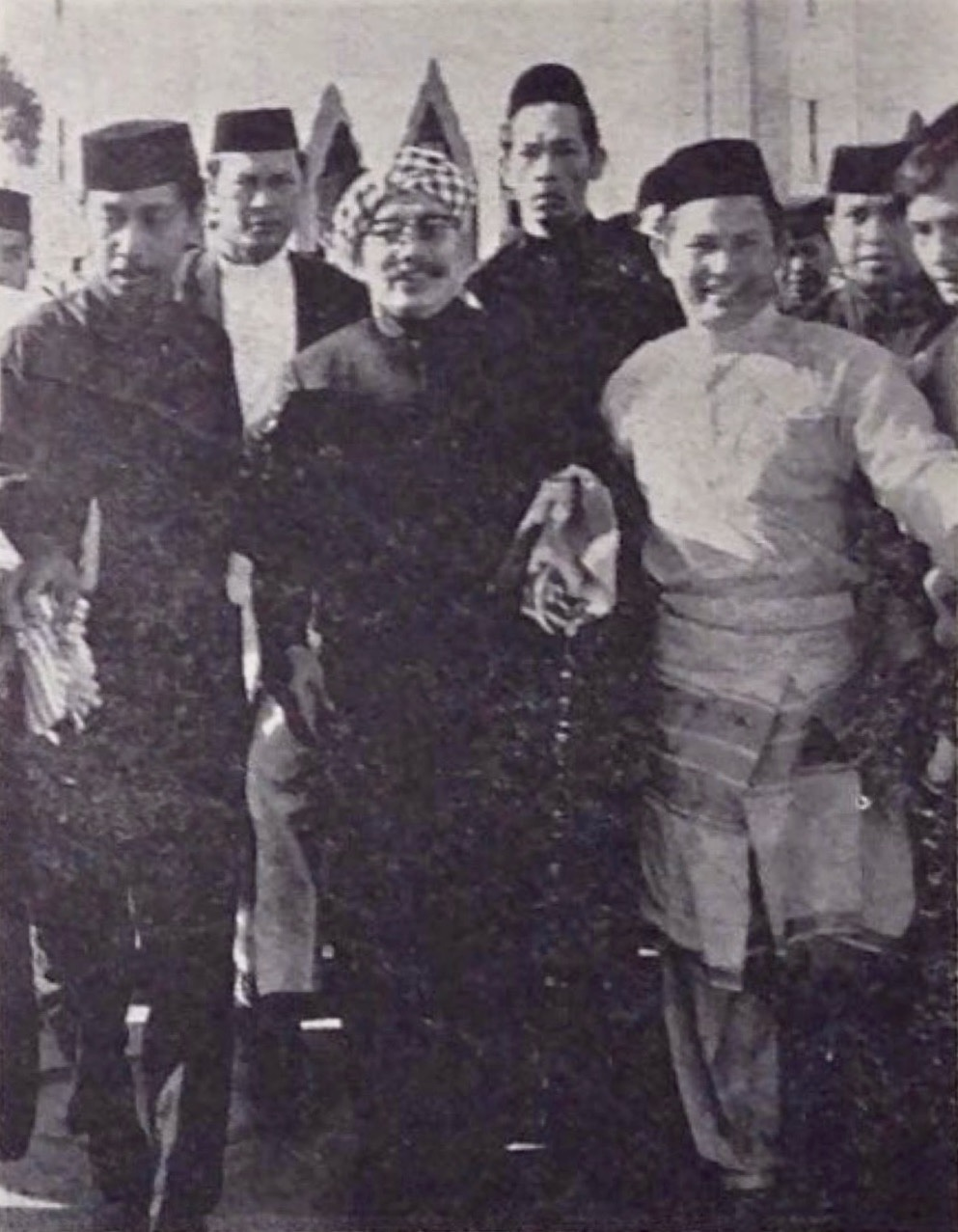
Pengiran Mokhtar Puteh (right) escorting Sultan Omar Ali at the Omar Ali Saifuddien Mosque in 1972

In October 1970, Pengiran Mokhtar Puteh read out a statement on behalf of Sultan Omar Ali Saifuddien III in response to comments made by former Malaysian Prime Minister Tunku Abdul Rahman regarding the territorial claim over Limbang. Pengiran Mokhtar Puteh rejected Tengku's assertion that Brunei could not make such a claim because it was a British colony, clarifying that Brunei had never been a British colony but had a friendly relationship with Britain. While Brunei relied on Britain for defence, it had achieved self-governing status. Mokhtar also debated the boundary issue with Tunku, stating that although Brunei had engaged in border talks, it had never agreed to the boundary and that Limbang rightfully belonged to Brunei. He further criticised Tengku's rejection of Brunei's claim to Limbang, pointing out that Tunku had been aware of the issue while serving as prime minister. The sultan described Tengku's statement as misleading and baseless, especially regarding Brunei's religious-based claim to Limbang.

Pengiran Mokhtar Puteh delivered a speech on behalf of Sultan Omar Ali at the Majlis Do'a Selamat dan Kesyukuran on 15 August 1977, expressing gratitude to the people of Brunei for their efforts in celebrating the sultan's 31st birthday and 10th anniversary on the throne, conveying the sultan's appreciation to organisations, welfare bodies, and community leaders, highlighting the importance of maintaining peace and stability, and urging citizens to support the government in preserving harmony, working towards the nation’s welfare, and fostering honest and constructive cooperation for Brunei's progress.

On 31 December 1983, during the declaration of Brunei's independence at Omar Ali Saifuddien Mosque in Bandar Seri Begawan, Pengiran Mokhtar Puteh, along with Abbas Al-Sufri, played a key role in carrying the "Warkah Pemashuran Kemerdekaan Brunei Darussalam" from the grand chamberlain into Taman Haji Sir Muda Omar 'Ali Saifuddien, accompanied by 20 individuals bearing the Royal Regalia Museum. Following the death of the retired Sultan Omar Ali in 1983, Pengiran Mokhtar Puteh significantly contributed to the development of pencak silat in Brunei. As panglima, he directed the establishment of the national silat federation, Persekutuan Silat Brunei, which was officially founded in 1986 to coincide with the SEA Games. In the 1989 SEA Games, he served as the chef-de-mission for the Brunei contingent.

For his final appointment before retiring, he returned to the position of head of Adat Istiadat Negara in 1995 at the Grand Chamberlain Office in Istana Darul Hana.

== Death and funeral ==
Pengiran Mokhtar Puteh died at the age of 85 at Raja Isteri Pengiran Anak Saleha Hospital on 30 April 2016. His funeral was attended by Sultan Hassanal Bolkiah and Crown Prince Al-Muhtadee Billah, who joined the congregational funeral prayer led by Abdul Aziz Juned at his residence in Kampong Telanai. He was later laid to rest at Kampong Telanai Muslim Cemetery. Naubat was reopened after being closed for 20 days following his passing, with a ceremony held at Lapau led by Pengiran Anak Abdul Aziz, and included prayers and tributes to him.

== Personal life ==
Pengiran Mokhtar Puteh was married and had 16 children. Among them are Pengiran Nor Ikhsan, Pengiran Haklimah, Pengiran Hishamuddin Alli, Pengiran Omaralli, Pengiran Saiful Redzalli, and Pengiran Hassanal Ali Saifuddin. He also had a brother, Pengiran Jaya, who served as the police commissioner from 1975 to 1983.

== Titles, styles and honours ==
=== Titles and styles ===
Personal standard of Pengiran Jaya Indera

On 4 May 1968, Pengiran Mokhtar Puteh was honoured by Sultan Hassanal Bolkiah with the cheteria title of Pengiran Penggawa Laila Bentara Istiadat Diraja Dalam Istana. He was later elevated to the title of Pengiran Jaya Indera on 9 May 1996. Each of these titles carries the style Yang Amat Mulia.

=== Awards ===
He has been given the following awards:

- Anugerah Pemimpin Belia Berjasa (2006)

=== Honours ===
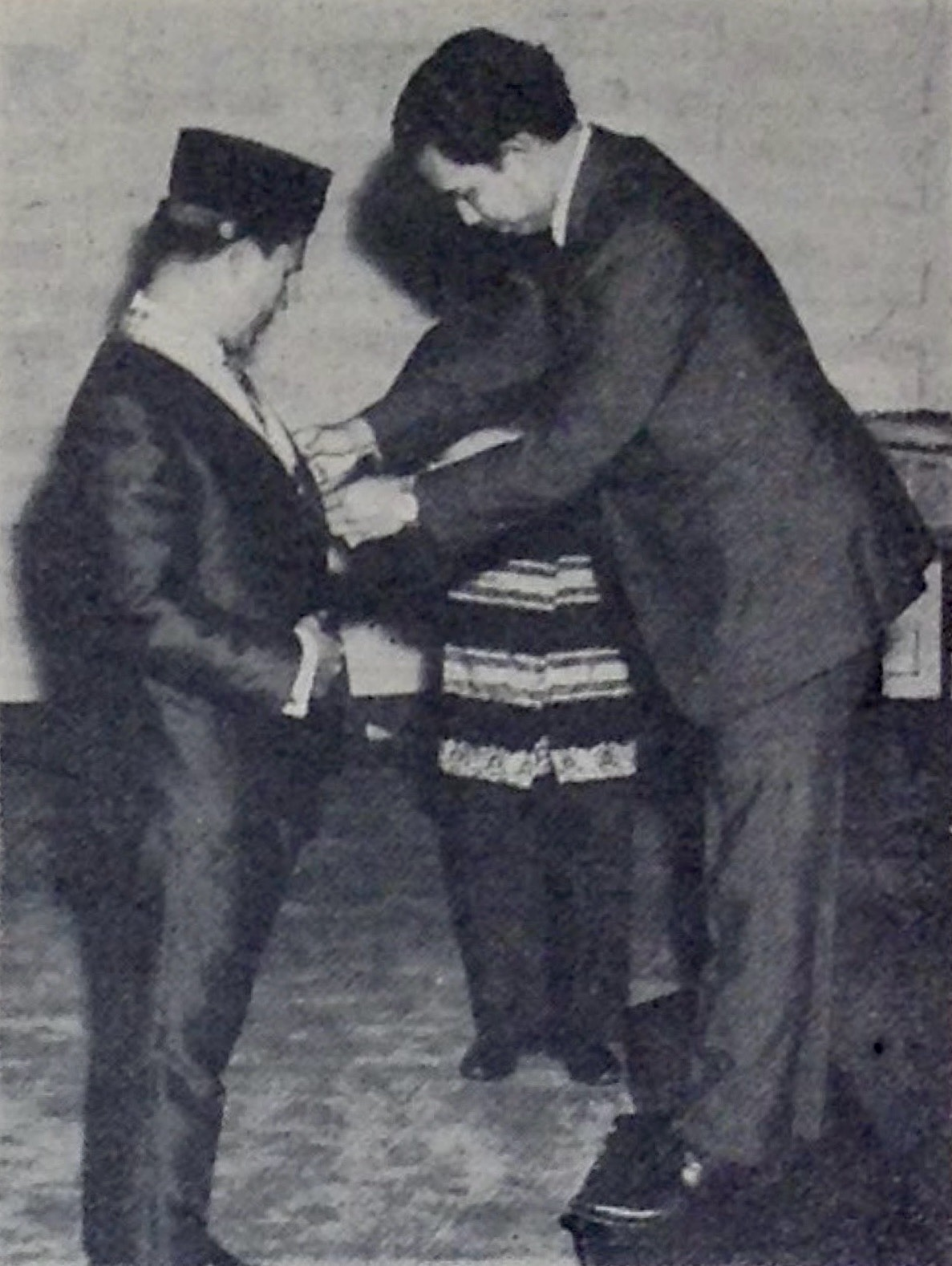
Pengiran Mokhtar Puteh being awarded the DK by Sultan Hassanal Bolkiah in 1970

Pengiran Mokhtar Puteh has been bestowed the following honours:

National

- Family Order of Laila Utama (DK; 1972) – Dato Laila Utama
- Family Order of Seri Utama (DK; 11 August 1970) – Dato Seri Utama
- Order of Setia Negara Brunei Second Class (DSNB; 1968) – Dato Setia
- Order of Seri Paduka Mahkota Brunei Second Class (DPMB; 23 September 1967) – Dato Paduka
- Order of Pahlawan Negara Brunei Third Class (PNB; 25 September 1963)
- Sultan Hassanal Bolkiah Medal First Class (PHBS; 12 February 1969)
- Pingat Bakti Laila Ikhlas (PBLI; 2008)
- Meritorious Service Medal (PJK; 12 February 1969)
- Long Service Medal (PKL; 2 August 1967)

Foreign

- United Kingdom:
  - Honorary Officer of the Order of the British Empire (CVO; 1972)
  - Honorary Member of the Order of the British Empire (MVO; 1992)
- Selangor:
  - Sultan Salahuddin Silver Jubilee Medal (3 September 1985)
