= Family Order of Seri Utama =

Awarded by the Sultan of Brunei
- Type: Order of chivalry
- Established: 1954
- Country: Brunei
- Eligibility: Members of the Brunei royal family, foreign dignitaries, and other distinguished individuals
- Status: Currently constituted
- Sovereign: Hassanal Bolkiah

Precedence
- Next (higher): Family Order of Laila Utama
- Next (lower): Order of Islam Brunei

The Most Esteemed Family Order of Seri Utama (Malay: Darjah Kerabat Seri Utama Yang Amat Dihormati) is an order of Brunei. It was established on 1 March 1954 by Sultan Omar Ali Saifuddien III. The order carries the post-nominal letters "DK II" as well as the title "Dato Seri Utama".

== Description ==
All of the emblems are made of gold or silver with enamel accents. The post-nominal letters DK II are associated with the order. "Dato Seri Utama" is a title that comes with the order.

== Recipients ==
Awards were given to members of the Royal Family, princes from other countries, chiefs of state, and other deserving individuals.

=== Ordinary recipients ===
- 1962: Prince Mohamed Bolkiah
- 1962: Pengiran Muda Hashim
- 1964: Yusof Husain
- 1967: Pengiran Jaya
- 1967: Pengiran Anak Khamis
- 1968: Prince Sufri Bolkiah
- 1968: Abdul Rahman Taha
- 1970: Pengiran Anak Mohammad Yusof
- 1970: Pengiran Mokhtar Puteh
- 1970: Pengiran Abdul Momin Othman
- 1970: Pengiran Abu Bakar
- 1970: Pengiran Mokhtar Puteh
- 1970: Pengiran Anak Chuchu
- 1970: Jamil Al-Sufri
- 1970: Zain Serudin
- 1970: Abdul Rahman Taha
- 1970: Mohammad Taha Hussein
- 1970: Metali Yassin
- 1970: Ismail Mat Serudin
- 1976: Rosnah Abdullah
- Unknown: Pengiran Abdul Momin Ismail
- Unknown: Ibrahim Mohammad Jahfar
- Unknown: Ismail Omar Abdul Aziz
- Unknown: Princess Nor Ehsani

=== Honorary recipients ===
- 1958: Sultan Abu Bakar of Pahang
- 1959: Neil Lawson: legal adviser to Sultan Omar Ali Saifuddien III
- 1963: Dennis White, British High Commissioner to Brunei
- 1963: Angus Mackintosh, British High Commissioner to Brunei

== See also ==
- Family Order of Laila Utama
