= Dennis White (colonial administrator) =

British colonial administrator (1910–1983)

Yang Dimuliakan Pehin Orang Kaya Datu Patinggi Maha Kornia Diraja Dato Seri Utama Sir Dennis White DK KBE CMG OSS PHBS
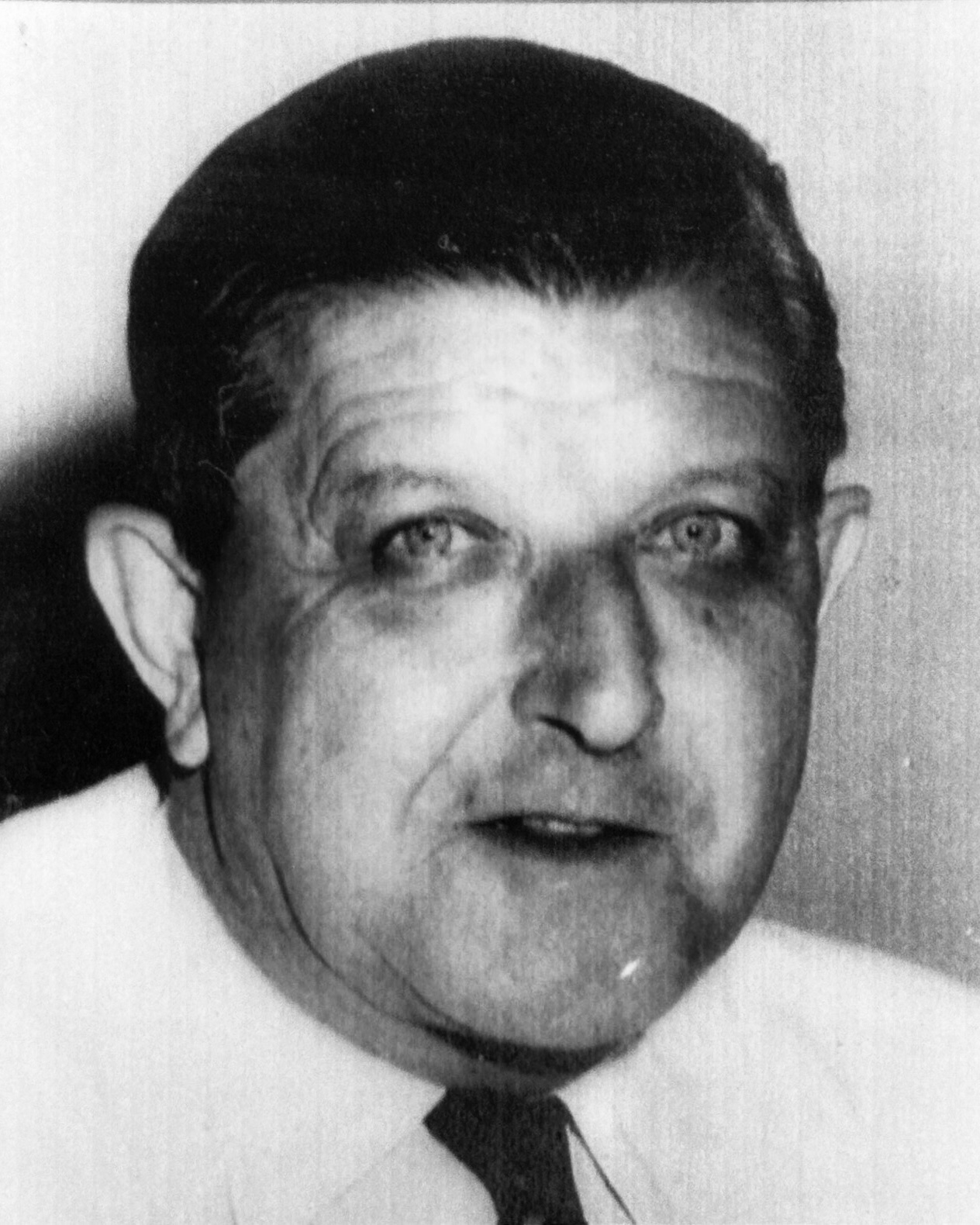
- White, c. 1959

1st British High Commissioner to Brunei
- In office 29 September 1959 – 31 March 1963
- Monarch: Elizabeth II
- Preceded by: Office established
- Succeeded by: Angus Mackintosh

19th British Resident to Brunei
- In office July 1958 – 29 September 1959
- Preceded by: John Orman Gilbert
- Succeeded by: Office abolished

Personal details
- Born: Dennis Charles White; 30 July 1910 Muswell Hill, London, England
- Died: 17 October 1983 (aged 73) Emery Down, Hampshire, England
- Education: Bradfield College
- Occupation: Colonial administrator

Sir Dennis Charles White (30 July 1910 – 17 October 1983) was a British colonial administrator who served as the last British resident to Brunei from 1958 to 1959 and later became the country's first British high commissioner, a position he held until his retirement in 1963.

White navigated Brunei through a period of intense political upheaval, including the 1962 Brunei revolt. White struggled to balance British interests, the Sultan Omar Ali Saifuddien III's authority, and rising nationalist movements, often clashing with both the sultan's advisors and Malayan leaders over the future of Brunei. His tenure was marked by his firm belief in Brunei's entry into Malaysia, his frustrations with the sultan's resistance, and his eventual resignation, partly due to health concerns and British dissatisfaction with his handling of the crisis. After retiring from colonial service, he remained involved in Brunei affairs as the government's agent in the United Kingdom from 1967 to 1983.

== Early life and education ==
Dennis Charles White was born on 30 July 1910 in Muswell Hill, London, to Stafford Charles White, a lieutenant in the King's Liverpool Regiment who was killed during the First World War in 1917, and Beatrix E. White. He also had a brother, Stafford Radcliffe White, a lieut-commander who was killed aboard HMS Narwhal (N45) during the Second World War in 1940. White was educated at Bradfield College.

== Career ==
=== Early career ===
White began his career in June 1932 as a cadet in the service of Charles Vyner Brooke's Raj of Sarawak and was promoted to district officer in 1938. During the Pacific War, he was held as a Japanese prisoner of war in Kuching from 1941 to 1945. In 1955, he was appointed senior resident minister in Her Majesty's Overseas Civil Service and later served as acting British resident to Brunei between June and December 1956.

=== British Resident to Brunei ===
In July 1958, White succeeded John Orman Gilbert as British resident to Brunei. By 1957, Gilbert's relationship with Sultan Omar Ali Saifuddien III had deteriorated as the latter sought greater autonomy, gradually diminishing the resident's influence and asserting control over the British administration—a shift encouraged by the British through key constitutional amendments that inadvertently expanded his authority via the State Council. White observed these changes and noted that the sultan's rising influence was reducing the actual power of the British administration. By the time White took office, the sultan was widely regarded as a modern and enlightened leader, with his popularity bolstered by the success of the first five-year National Development Plan. Significant progress had been made in infrastructure, including the construction of a trunk road and bridges, alongside advancements in social services, education, and healthcare. These developments greatly improved the quality of life in Brunei, particularly in education, where the expansion of secondary schools led to a surge in demand. Anthony Abell believed that White's arrival would strengthen ties between the State Council and the British administration, and he specifically requested White to do everything in his power "to woo the sultan from the influence of the schoolmasters Marsal Maun and Pengiran Muhammad Ali."

White disagreed with Anthony Abell's radical views, particularly regarding British authority over the police and other security matters, and instead proposed a more pragmatic approach that supported local legislation in managing security, which was ultimately incorporated into the final agreement. However, Abell felt betrayed by the British government's acceptance of the sultan's demands, which largely disregarded his constitutional efforts. With the sultan prevailing in his final dispute with Abell, this marked a crucial moment in Brunei’s constitutional development. Meanwhile, the Colonial Office advised White to reject a visit from Tun Abdul Razak, the deputy prime minister of Malaya, as Britain sought to avoid any appearance of endorsing a union between Malaya and Brunei. Similarly, Geofroy Tory, the British high commissioner in Malaya, was cautioned against visiting Brunei to prevent the perception that Britain supported closer ties between the two nations. White's stance aligned with the broader British strategy of maintaining neutrality while monitoring Brunei's political trajectory.

By continuing to have friendly ties with the sultan and his advisors and learning from past administration errors, White first won good ties in the community. However, behind the scenes, he presented a bleak assessment to the Colonial Office, believing the sultan was deliberately delaying constitutional reforms. White sympathised with the Partai Rakyat Brunei (PRB), considering it Brunei's most democratic party, but privately distrusted the local nobles and radical nationalists. British diplomats, including Abell, grew frustrated during his term as they realised that Brunei's political deadlock persisted despite the change in the British resident. White also noted that the PRB's financial situation had worsened, leading to a decline in public support by January 1959, with several committee members facing charges of financial misconduct. The party was further weakened when Vice-President Salleh Masri was imprisoned for perjury, which prevented the PRB from sending a delegation to the constitutional negotiations in London, forcing them to rely on Zaini Ahmad, a former member, to present their views—though his efforts proved futile.

=== British High Commissioner to Brunei ===
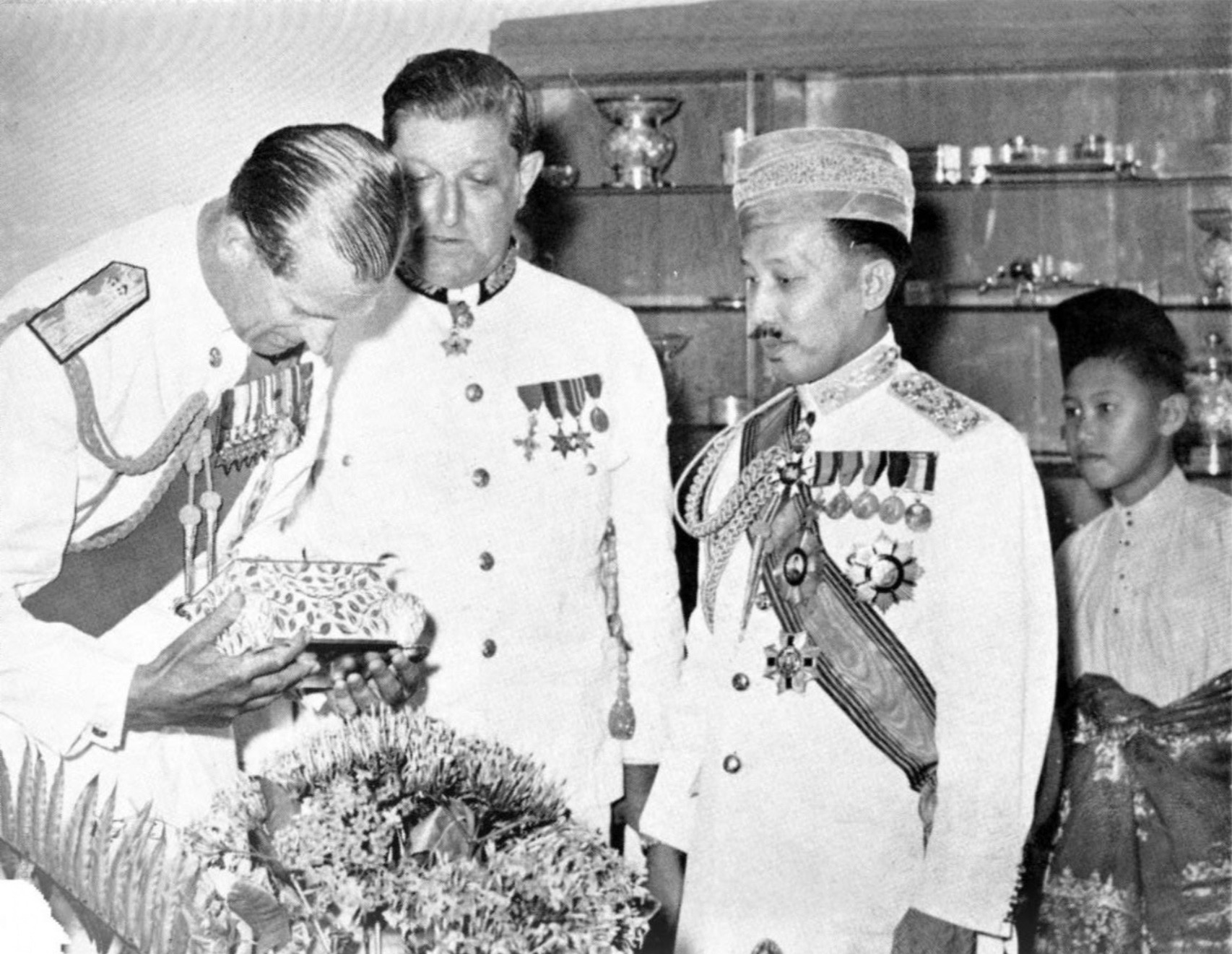
From left to right: Prince Philip, White and Sultan Omar Ali Saifuddien III at Istana Darul Hana in 1959

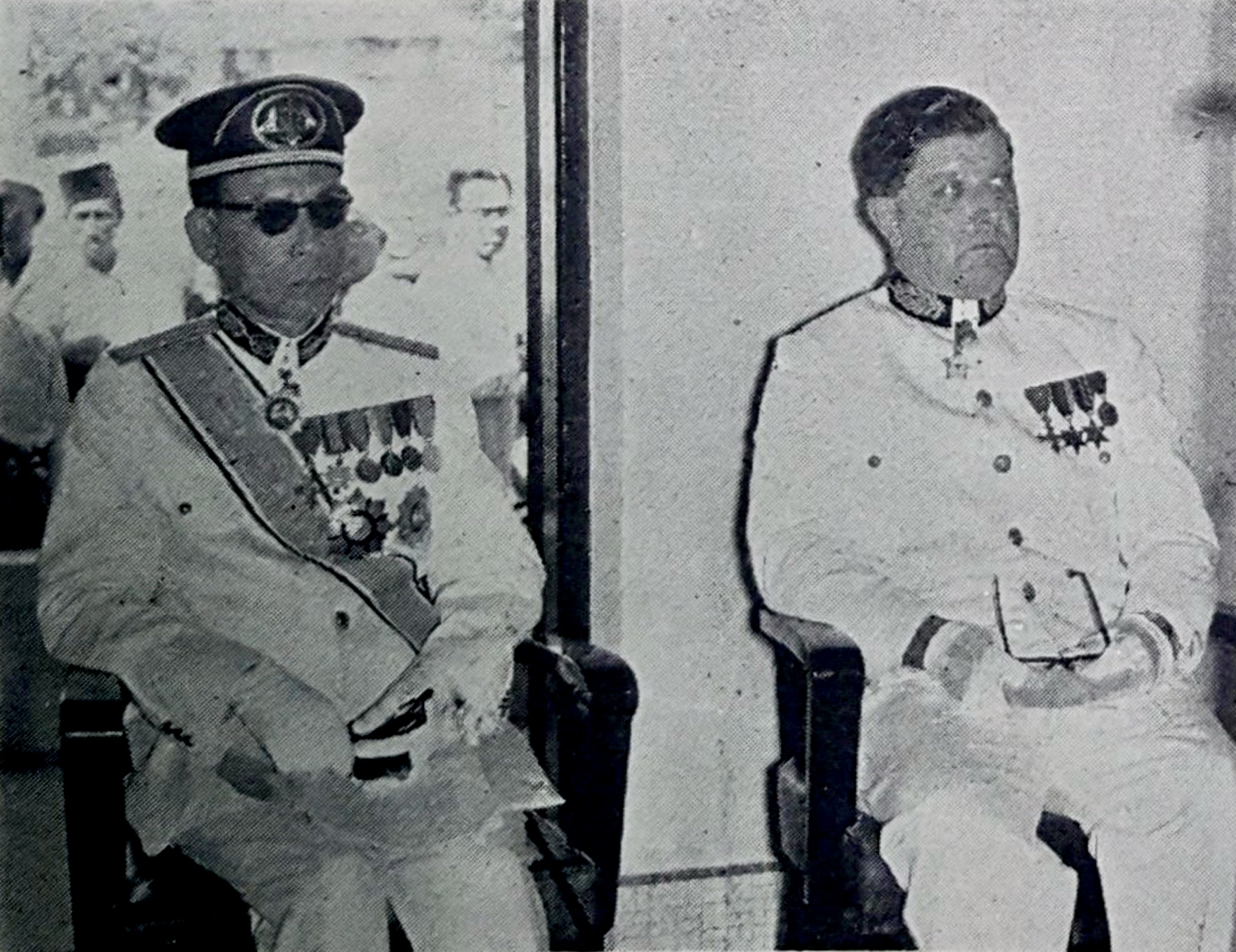
Ibrahim (left) alongside White (right) during the signing of Brunei's constitution at Lapau in 1959

After the Brunei Agreement was signed and the constitution was proclaimed on 29 September 1959, White and Roland Turnbull supported the sultan's nomination of Ibrahim Mohammad Jahfar as Brunei's chief minister, believing him to be the most qualified local candidate. White recognised Ibrahim's extensive experience in the British government, which began in the 1930s, and his deep understanding of British politics. He saw Ibrahim's nomination as a stabilising force for Brunei's political transition, given his significant role in constitutional negotiations and his prior leadership during the Japanese occupation.

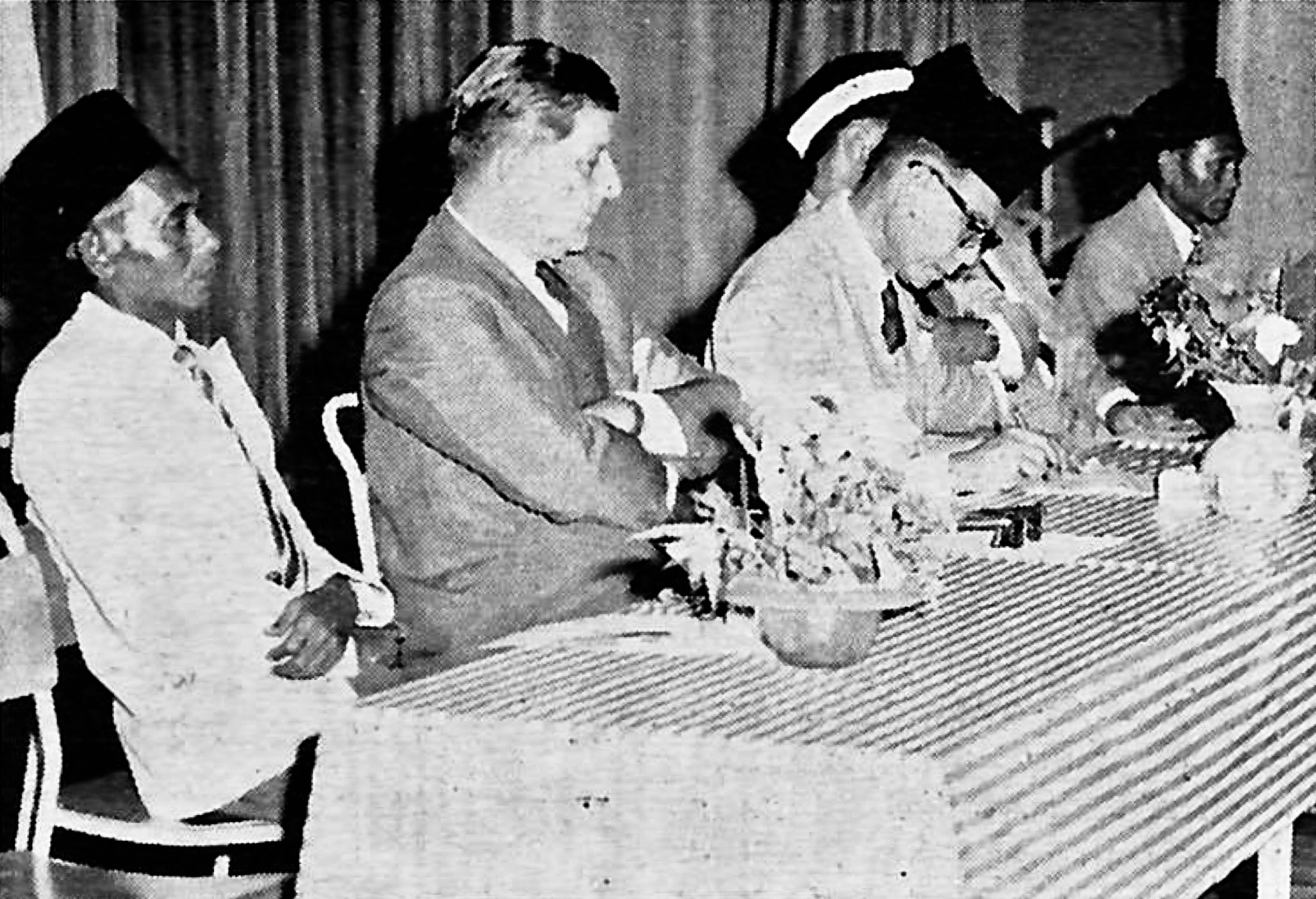
Othman Bidin, White and Ibrahim at the Brunei Malay Teachers Association Conference in 1960

White became the first British high commissioner for Brunei following the approval of the constitution, which abolished the position of British resident. His lack of executive authority presented several challenges, as he struggled to influence the government without risking the perception of interference. The fact that key government positions were filled by Bruneian Malays, who rarely engaged with him, further hindered his effectiveness. The shift from British residency to internal self-governance led to administrative inefficiencies, as decisions were deferred to the cautious and methodical sultan. White expressed frustration with his limited role, highlighting the difficulty of navigating Brunei's political process within the new constitutional framework. In April 1960, he opposed Brunei's potential union with Malaya, supporting local leaders and advocating for greater cooperation among the Borneo territories. While he publicly backed the PRB and its Negara Kesatuan Kalimantan Utara idea, he gave contradictory advice to the Colonial Office, initially recommending elections and later advising caution. British diplomats were confused by his inconsistent approach and considered delaying elections due to concerns about the PRB potentially establishing a one-party state. However, the sultan prioritised resolving the nationality enactment before holding elections, and White was powerless to prevent this.

In 1961, White played a pivotal role in the debates over Brunei's nationality laws, opposing strict citizenship conditions for British protected persons. He observed internal divisions within the government regarding Chinese citizenship, with one faction advocating a hardline approach and others, including White, supporting more lenient measures to secure Chinese loyalty. Although a compromise was reached in February, White noted the proposed bill was delayed, speculating that the sultan's desire to merge Brunei with Malaya before elections to avoid opposition in the Legislative Council of Brunei (LegCo) was a factor. Later that year, in April, White reported the imminent collapse of Brunei's medical service due to mismanagement and later witnessed escalating tensions when a Malayan forestry officer was assaulted, leading to a crisis fueled by accusations of colonialism and exacerbated by Tunku's clumsy intervention, which further strained relations between Brunei's palace party and the PRB.

In late June 1961, White joined the Governors of North Borneo and Sarawak in Singapore for consultations with George Douglas-Hamilton, the United Kingdom Commissioner-General in Southeast Asia, regarding Tunku Abdul Rahman's Malaysia proposal. Concerned about the significant differences in economic, educational, and political development between the Borneo states and Malaya, they were initially unenthusiastic about the proposal. (Note: In July 1961, White wrote in a letter expressing his criticism of Tunku's "bull-dozing tactics" concerning the Borneo territories, emphasising the need for a more diplomatic approach rather than one based on forceful persuasion.) In August, White invited the sultan to share his views on Malaysia, but the sultan declined, citing constitutional and treaty restrictions. White speculated that the sultan's reluctance stemmed from strong public opposition, particularly the PRB's protest over postponed District Council elections. The sultan later revealed his stance to the Executive Council before the London talks in November.

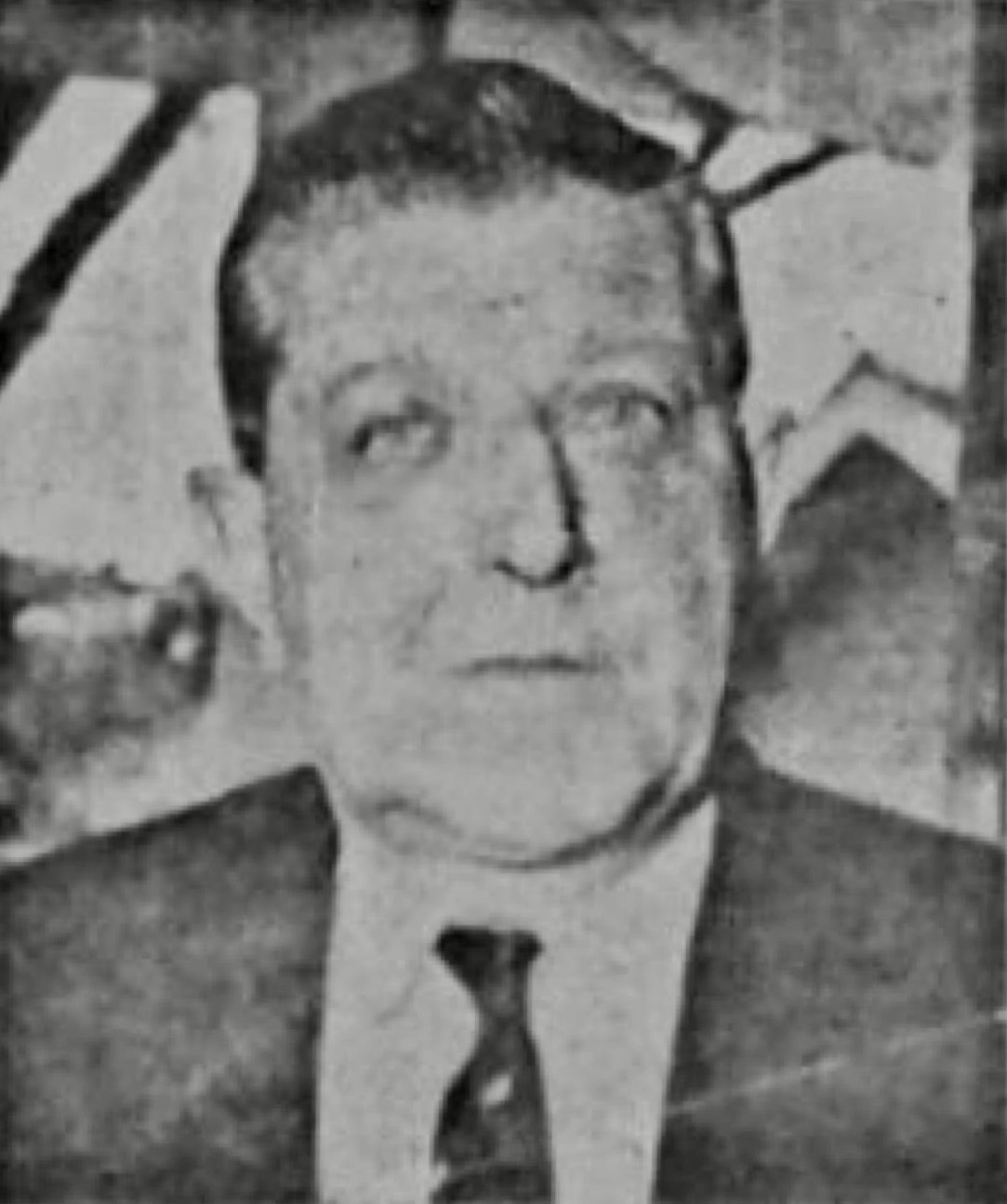
White, c. 1962

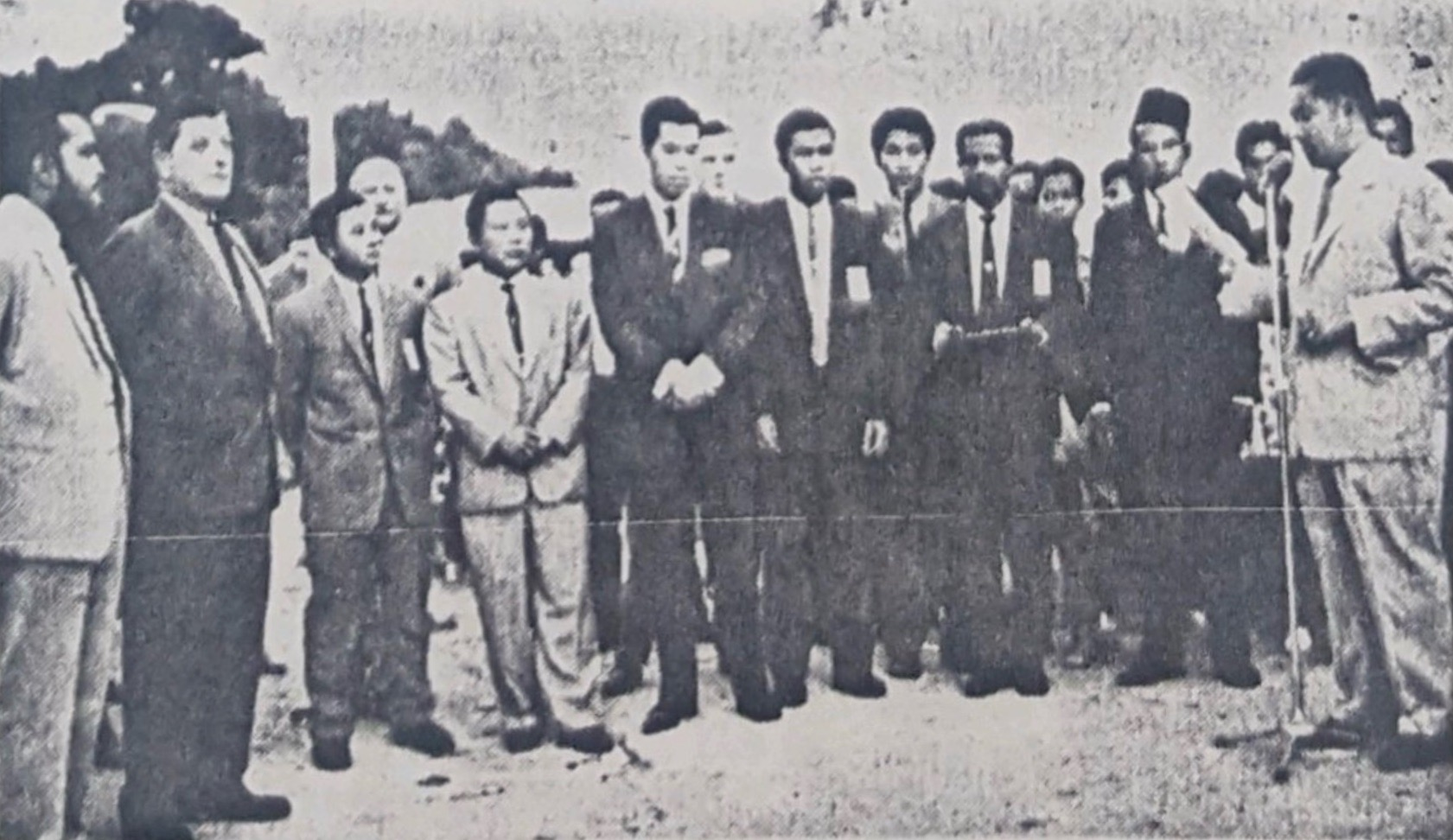
Zaini (first from the left) and White (second from the left) attending the official opening of the trade market in October 1962

White advocated for Brunei's shift away from Colonial Office supervision, arguing that the British high commissioner should report to the Commonwealth Relations Office to enhance Brunei's independent status, similar to Malaya. As early as 1962, he proposed a model akin to British representation in the Persian Gulf, contending that a high commissioner appointed by the Colonial Office was politically unwise and should serve only a consultative role in Brunei's Executive Council.

Contrary to claims that the sultan was under heavy British pressure to negotiate Malaysia's formation, White's reports in July 1962 suggest he had little influence over the sultan's decision. Instead, Brunei's move toward talks with Malaya was likely driven by new information, including parts of the Cobbold Commission, discussions with Kuala Lumpur, and internal political pressures. In November 1962, the Sultan, through White, appealed to the British government regarding Limbang's repatriation, even writing to Duncan Sandys, the secretary of state for the colonies, after legal advisor Neil Lawson presented a case. However, these efforts failed due to Sarawak's position.

As Brunei's potential admission into Malaysia became public, British officials began considering the consequences if the state opted out. However, White was unable to pressure the Bruneian government into action. Consequently, it was decided that White should return to Britain to consult the Colonial Office on the Limbang issue, following the sultan's suggestion. Minister of state for colonial affairs, George Petty-Fitzmaurice, saw this as an opportunity to "keep the sultan guessing" about Britain's intentions. In mid-November, White was recalled to London to discuss the Malaysia Plan and take personal leave.

=== 1962 Brunei revolt ===
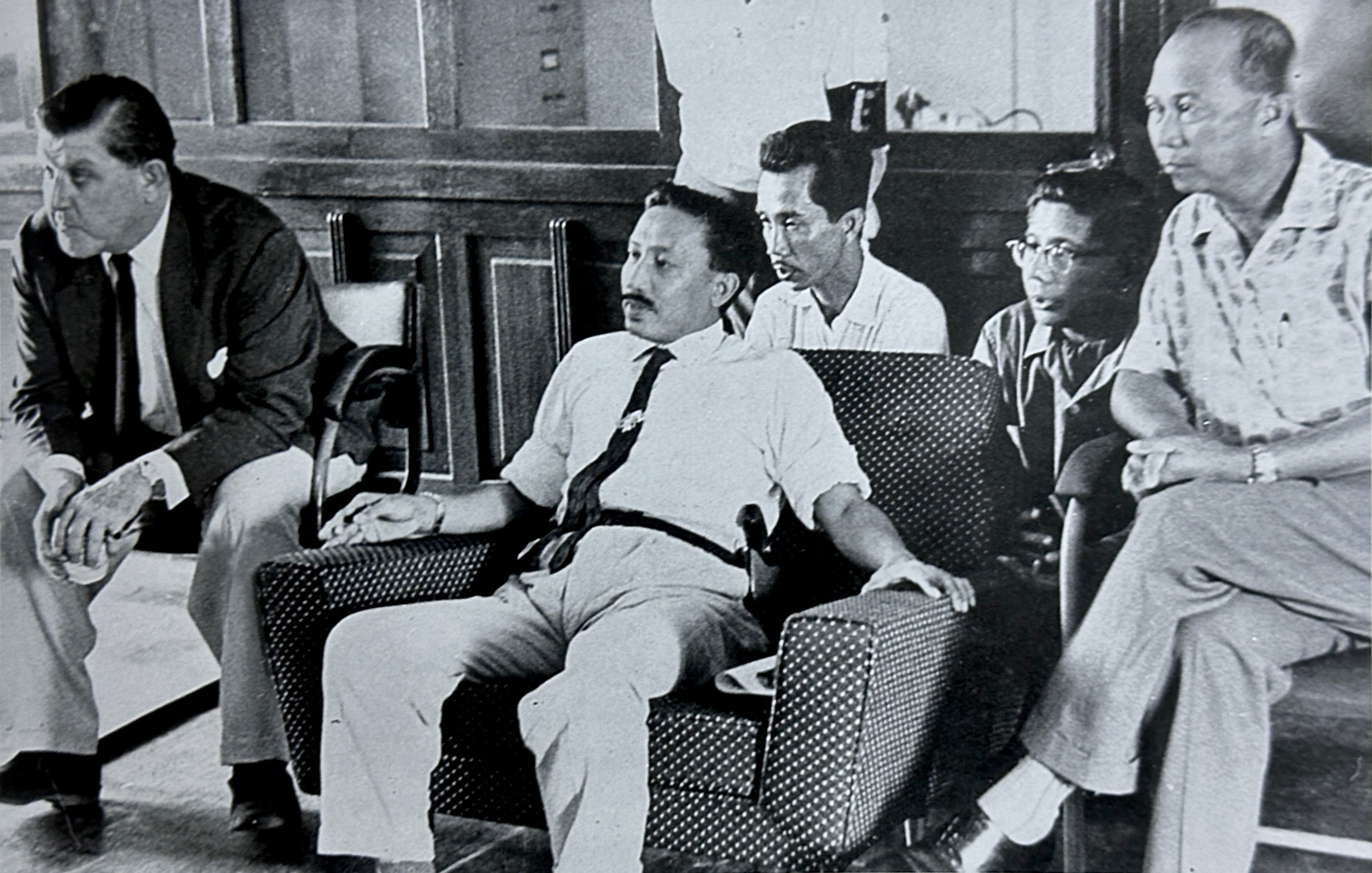
From left to right: White, the sultan, Pengiran Muhammad Yusuf, Raja Azam, and Marsal, during a press conference with foreign journalists at the State Secretary's Office building on 15 December 1962

Initially, White and other British diplomats urged the sultan to improve his public image and expand social initiatives, believing he had lost touch with his people. However, later assessments revealed this view was inaccurate. Before the uprising, White had acknowledged the sultan's strong personal influence and widespread support. The sudden outbreak of the 1962 Brunei revolt, led by the PRB's military wing, Tentera Nasional Kalimantan Utara (TNKU), caught White off guard. Although intelligence reports had warned of unrest, he insisted he was shocked and deeply unsettled by the events. This lack of preparation led to speculation, with some conspiracy theories suggesting that external forces such as the CIA and MI6 played a role in inciting the rebellion—an allegation White did not directly address in his reports.

The uprising caused the collapse of Brunei's civilian government, leading to uncertainty over who was in control. White faced criticism for his lack of involvement, leaving his aide-de-camp, W. J. Parks, as the sole link between Brunei and the British government. Though Parks reported growing discontent, he failed to grasp the severity of the situation and did not coordinate effectively with senior commanders. His inadequate response, coupled with White's delayed return, worsened Britain's unpreparedness. Ultimately, the sultan's decisive action proved critical in quelling the rebellion; his denunciation of the insurgents as traitors shifted the psychological battle in his favour, despite the uprising being primarily anti-Malaysia.

The sultan's claim that the rebels were treacherous altered the course of the conflict, and his support was crucial in ending the rebellion. White acknowledged that the sultan's stance was essential in winning the psychological battle, despite the revolt being primarily anti-Malaysia. By 10 December 1962, Brunei Town was described as "quiet," though TNKU forces remained active on the outskirts, including their continued occupation of the Jerudong jail. Reinforcements had arrived, with RAF Regiment units replacing 1/2GR personnel guarding the Brunei Airport. That morning, Brigadier J. B. A. Glennie arrived with a small Force HQ to assume overall command of the operation. Meanwhile, White, who had been receiving treatment for a stomach ailment in London, rushed back to Brunei after attending crisis meetings at the Colonial Office and in Singapore to resume his official duties. On the same day, Douglas-Hamilton visited to assess the situation and report on potential consequences for the Malaysia Plan. Though his assessment likely focused on the capital rather than the more severely affected areas, White's 11 December telegram to London stated that the military buildup was successful and the operation was proceeding well, suggesting that Brunei Town had stabilised.

=== Suspension of Brunei's constitution ===
White was appointed as an ex officio member of the Emergency Council, which the sultan formed on 20 December 1962 to temporarily replace the LegCo following the Brunei revolt. On the same day, he also served on the Emergency Executive Council, led by Marsal. The government was divided when the order to suspend Brunei's constitution was issued. White had warned the sultan that such a suspension would be unwise and unconstitutional, but Attorney General Abdul Aziz Zain, with advice from the Executive Council, sought help from his Malayan counterpart, Cecil Majella Sheridan, to draft an order suspending the constitution and removing elected members, thereby granting the sultan full legislative and executive control. After the sultan signed the order, the suspension was announced on Radio Brunei. White vehemently objected, claiming he had been "tricked" into signing it and demanding an explanation from Abdul Aziz. Douglas-Hamilton consulted United Kingdom Commission legal advisor Graham Starforth Hill, who believed the sultan's existing authority under Section 84 of the constitution was sufficient. White's main concern was the public perception that the entire constitution had been suspended. After the uprising, White and Douglas-Hamilton saw the sultan as key to stabilising Brunei's future and strongly opposed A. M. Azahari due to his socialist views and ties to Indonesia. White believed Brunei's entry into Malaysia was vital for British interests and regional security, and despite warnings against coercion, he pressured the sultan to consider joining Malaysia. However, the sultan remained firm in his desire for Brunei's independence under continued British protection, prioritising sovereignty over Malaysian or British interests.

By 28 December 1962, the Colonial Office sought White's opinion on whether Azahari should be tried and imprisoned in Brunei, as this could prove embarrassing. The issue arose due to the Fugitive Offenders Act, which required the state issuing the warrant to hold the accused in custody. White promptly responded, expressing concern that Azahari's trial and detention in Brunei would pose a serious security risk. While Azahari's absence during the uprising had diminished his prestige, White feared his return could reignite support among his followers. On 31 December, White offered to step down as high commissioner, acknowledging that he had been too quick to trust Azahari's assurances about using constitutional means and had underestimated the threat to Brunei's security. Before the uprising, White had concluded that a firmer stance with the sultan was necessary to force a decision on Brunei's future, but he felt unfit for such a role. Having originally agreed to serve a three-year term instead of the usual five, White's resignation was attributed to health reasons, though Douglas-Hamilton ensured it was not perceived as resulting from a dispute with the sultan or the state secretary. Deeply affected by the 1962 revolt in Brunei, White submitted his resignation, citing his misjudgment of the situation, his failure to take a tougher stance with the sultan, and his health issues, with the Colonial Office's growing frustration with his approach contributing to his departure.

In January 1963, Tunku accused the British of failing to act on intelligence, sending a harshly worded questionnaire that White found offensive. However, British officials, including George Petty-Fitzmaurice and Douglas-Hamilton, rejected the accusations, defending the security services' approach. Around the same time, White emphasised the challenges of convicting rebels for serious crimes like treason or waging war against the sultan, advocating for the release of many detainees without charges, particularly those coerced into joining the uprising. His stance aligned with Douglas-Hamilton's call for leniency, proposing a committee of review to prioritise the release of those who had been misled or were least culpable, which was approved by both the military and Brunei's government. White also played a key role in uniting smaller parties that had previously lost to the PRB, leading to the formation of the Brunei Alliance Party (BAP). As part of British efforts to prevent another rebellion, White was tasked with negotiating parole for imprisoned PRB rebels in exchange for their support of Malaysia. While the success of this strategy remains uncertain, some released PRB members later won elections in 1965. The BAP strongly endorsed Brunei's entry into the Malaysian Federation, claiming the backing of both the sultan and the British.

=== Continued role despite British frustration ===
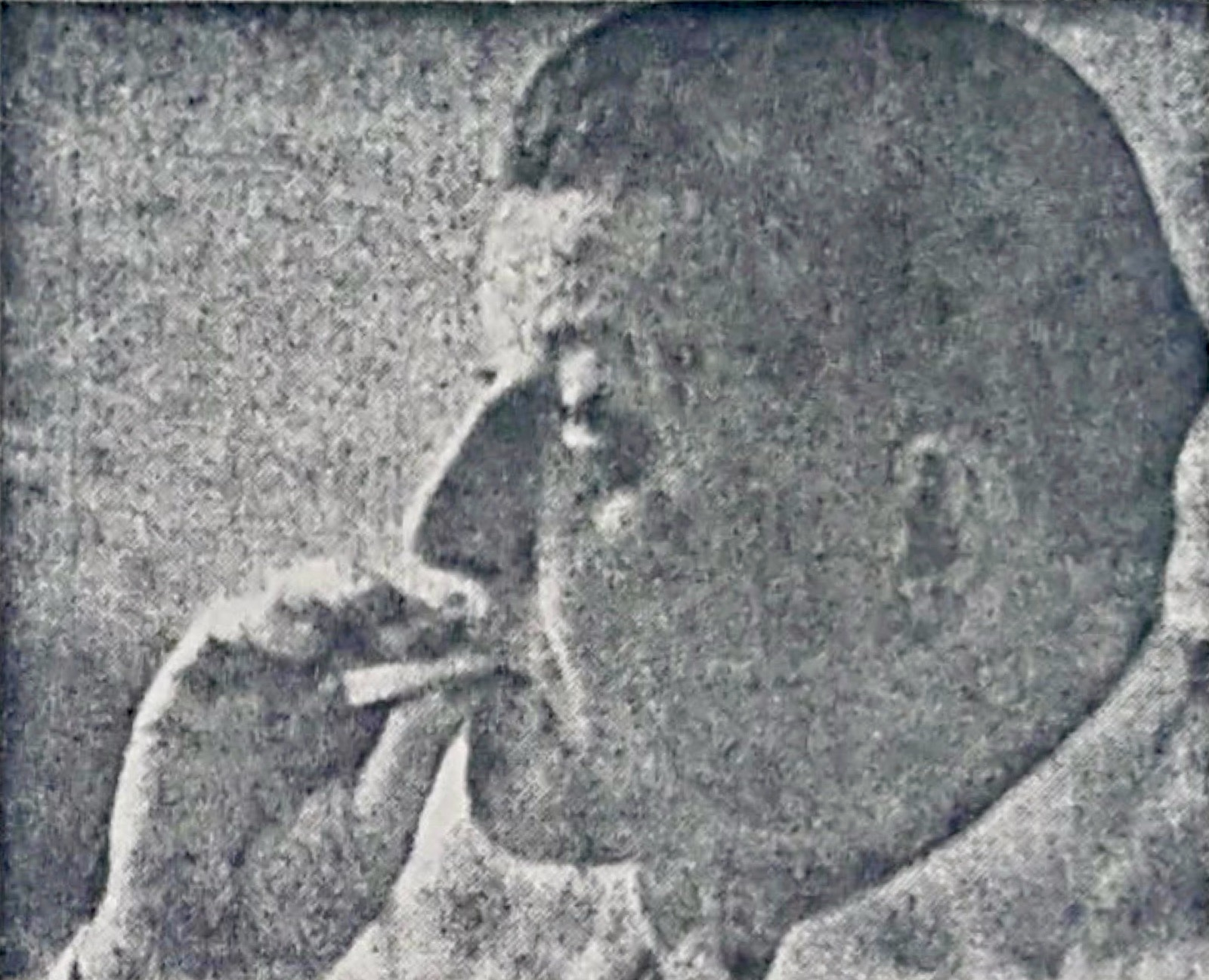
White, c. 1963

Despite growing frustration by the British with his performance, White remained in his post for three months after the Brunei uprising, largely due to the sultan's reluctance to see him replaced, as the sultan felt more comfortable with White than his successor, Angus MacKay Mackintosh. White, with his extensive experience in British Borneo and fluency in Malay, was succeeded by MacKintosh on 31 March 1963, who lacked the same local expertise and faced similar frustrations in trying to persuade the sultan to initiate domestic reforms, quickly realising that the positive effects of the uprising had faded.

White was assigned in March 1963 to evaluate the sincerity and suitability of incarcerated PRB leaders who would promote Brunei's accession to Malaysia. He encouraged them to form a new political party under Pengiran Muhammad Yusuf, provided they pledged support for Malaysia and constitutional reform. White questioned three key figures—Abdul Hapidz, Pengiran Metussin Lampoh, and Tengah Hasip—who all denied prior knowledge of the uprising. He found Pengiran Metussin eager for Brunei to gain independence before joining Malaysia, Tengah cooperative but lacking leadership skills, and Abdul Hapidz open to collaboration. White recommended granting them and others parole so they could address the public and potentially join the new party. Meanwhile, on 6 March, the committee of twenty-four approved the Sarawak United Peoples' Party and Sabah Alliance Party's requests for hearings. By 14 March, Indonesian delegates had informed U Thant that Sukarno had advised them not to pursue the Malaysia issue at that time. White later reported to London that the sultan deemed sending a delegation to New York unnecessary, given the progress in Brunei's Malaysia negotiations and easing tensions with Indonesia.

== Later life and death ==
In April 1964, White would leave Brunei. He grew increasingly frustrated with the sultan and his advisors, particularly their resistance to British initiatives such as the Borneo Federation and the Malaysia Plan. Constitutional constraints prevented him from curbing the sultan's authority, and he resented the influence of the sultan's inner circle, whom he saw as obstructive "backseat drivers." He was also irritated by the sultan's strong religious convictions, believing they hindered rational decision-making. Though White sympathised with the PRB, he could not openly support their cause. His frustrations led him to be more receptive to Tunku's desire to "teach Brunei a lesson" for rejecting Malaysia. Mockingly, White remarked that the sultan believed his decisions were guided by supernatural inspiration, acknowledging his own limited ability to shape Brunei's future.

By 1966, White supported the formation of political organisations that could bring about constitutional reform. His tacit endorsement of the PRB in the 1950s was echoed in his support for Brunei People's Independence Party (BAKER), which became a key political force in the 1960s. White's encouragement of BAKER's expansion aligned with a broader British strategy to develop a structured political entity capable of negotiating a power transition. Alongside other British officials like Fernley Webber, White helped lay the groundwork for Brunei’s leadership to become more politically adept and experienced. From 1967 until his death, he was the Brunei government agent in the United Kingdom.

White died in Emery Down, Lyndhurst, Hampshire on 17 October 1983.

== Titles, styles and honours ==
=== Titles and styles ===
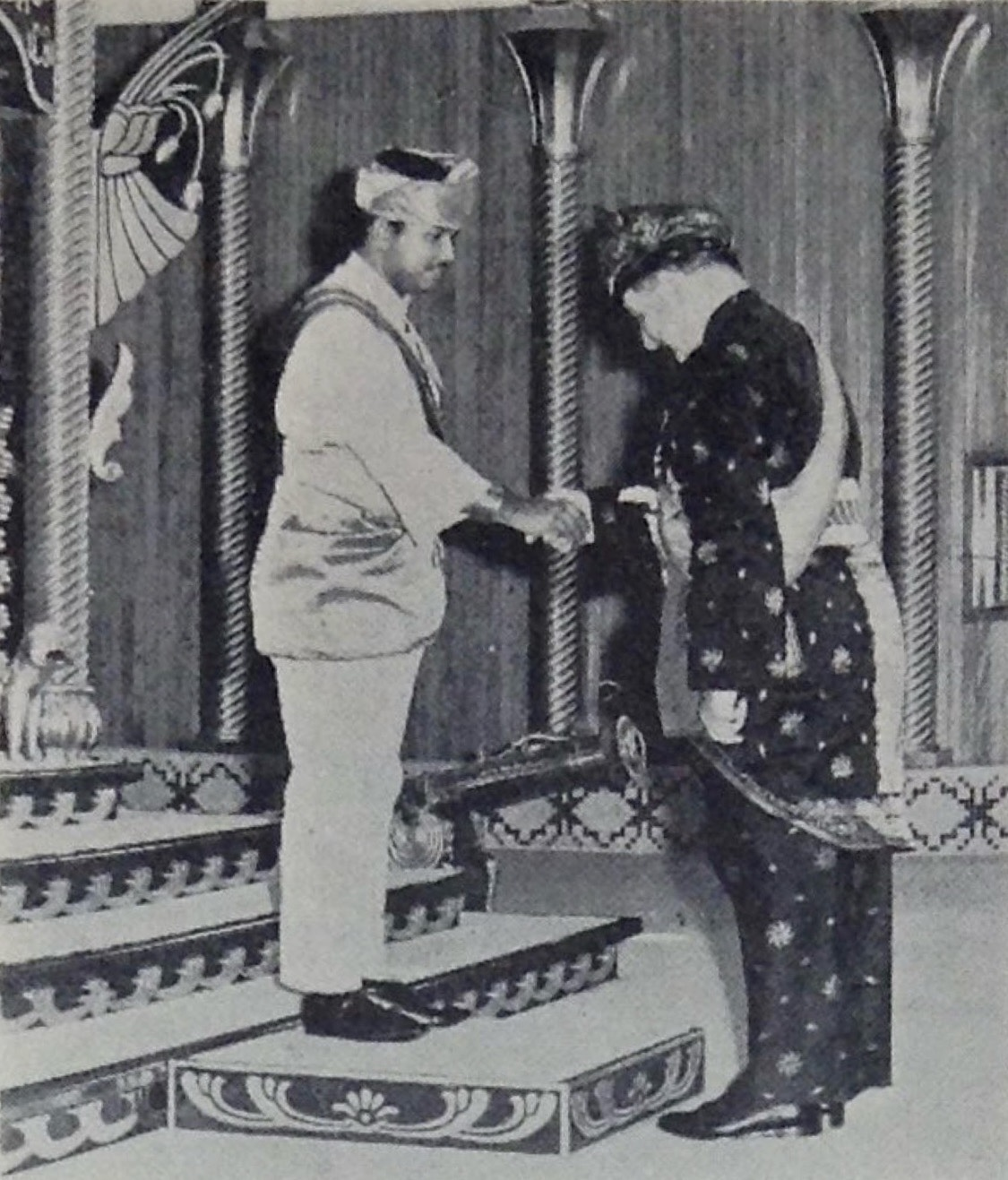
White (right) at the title bestowment ceremony held at the Lapau in 1970

On 20 April 1970, White was honoured by Sultan Hassanal Bolkiah with the manteri title of Pehin Orang Kaya Datu Patinggi Maha Kornia Diraja, bearing the style Yang Dimuliakan.

=== Honours ===
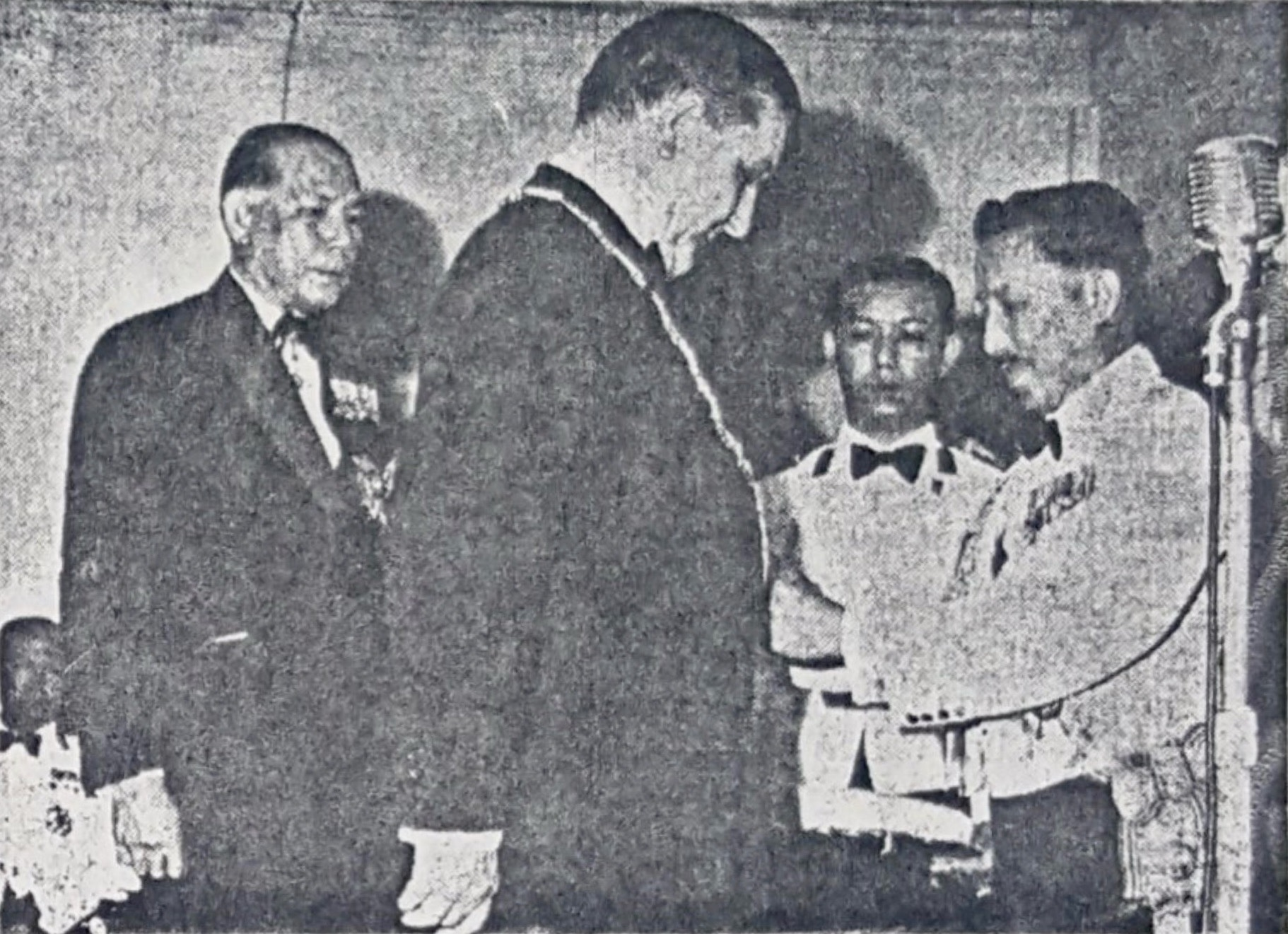
White being awarded the DK by Sultan Omar Ali Saifuddien III in 1963

White has been bestowed the following honours:

National

- Knight Commander of the Order of the British Empire (KBE; 1962) – Sir
- Officer of the Order of the British Empire (OBE; 1953)
- Order of St Michael and St George Companion (CMG; 1959)
- Pacific Star
- 1939–1945 Star
- Queen Elizabeth II Coronation Medal (2 June 1953)

Foreign

- Brunei:
  - Family Order of Seri Utama (DK; 31 March 1963) – Dato Seri Utama
  - Order of Seri Paduka Mahkota Brunei First Class (SPMB) – Dato Seri Paduka
  - Sultan Hassanal Bolkiah Medal (PHBS)
- Sarawak:
  - Officer of the Order of the Star of Sarawak (OSS)

== Notes ==
Diplomatic posts
Preceded by John Orman Gilbert	British Resident to Brunei; July 1958 – 29 September 1959	Succeeded by Office abolished
Preceded by Office established	British High Commissioner to Brunei; 29 September 1959 – 31 March 1963	Succeeded by Angus Mackintosh
