= Arthur Adair =

British diplomat

Major Arthur Adair CVO MBE
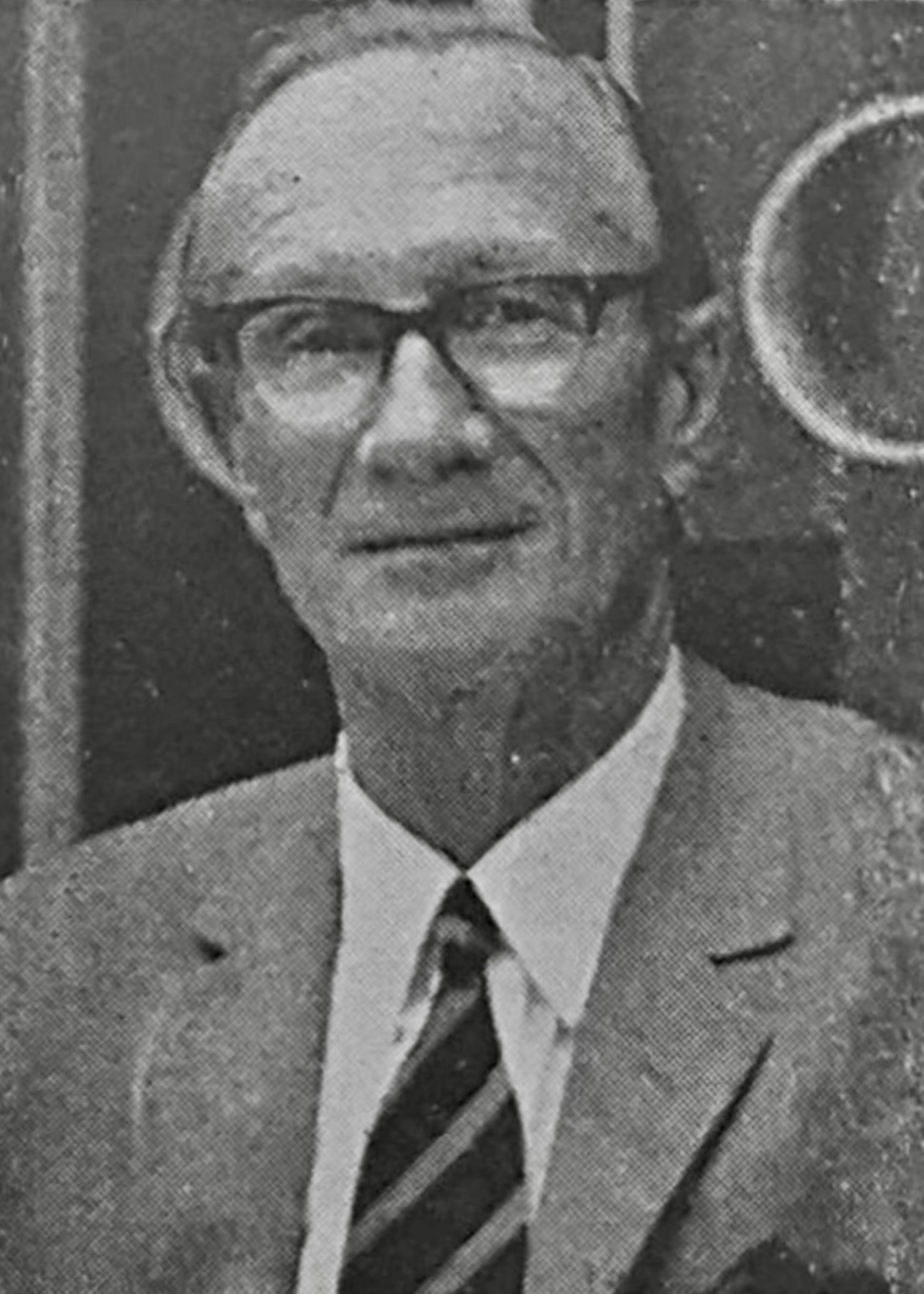
- Arthur Adair in 1971

5th British High Commissioner to Brunei
- In office December 1967 – January 1972
- Monarch: Elizabeth II
- Preceded by: Fernley Webber
- Succeeded by: Peter Gautrey

Personal details
- Born: 10 February 1913
- Died: 1981 (aged 68–69)
- Education: Emmanuel College (BA)
- Occupation: Military officer and diplomat
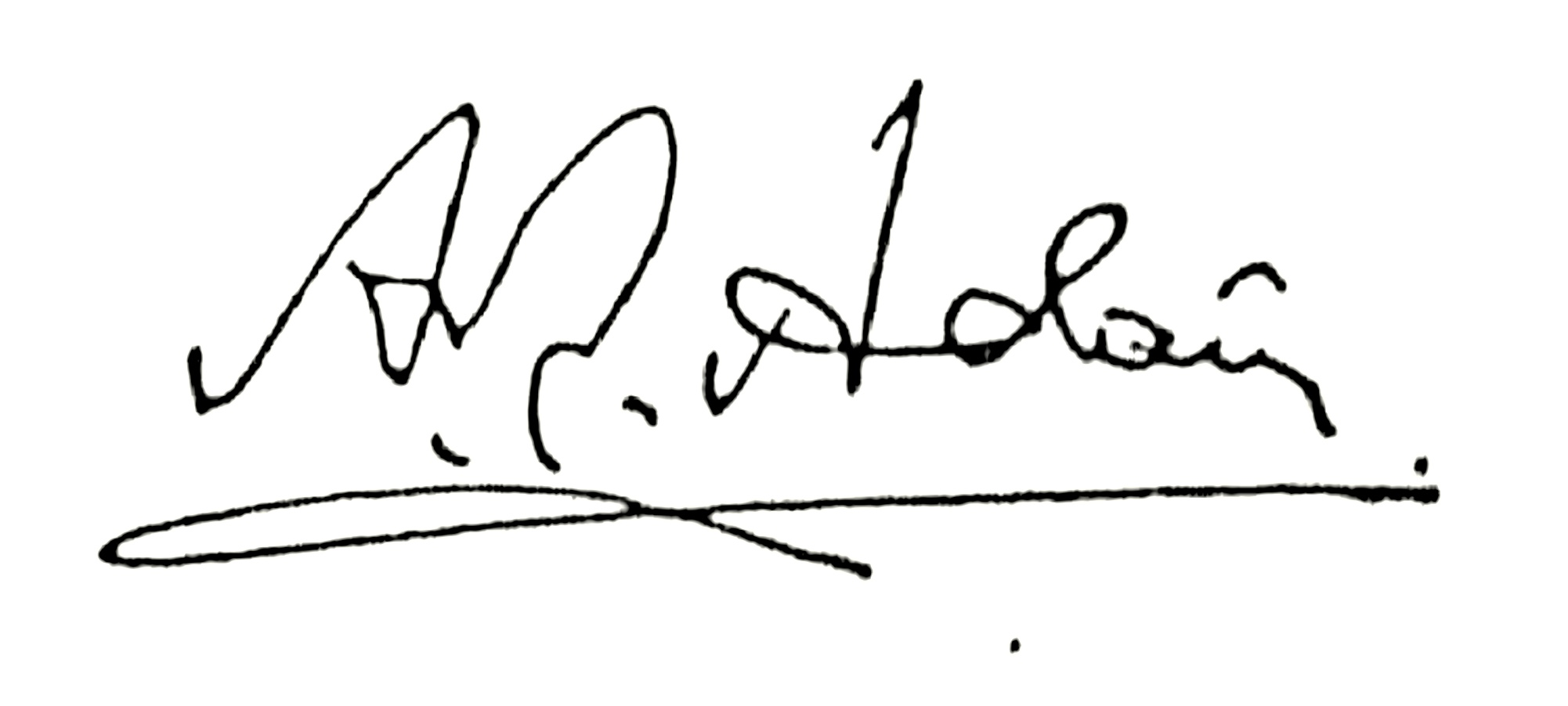
- Signature

Military service
- Branch/service: British Army
- Years of service: 1939–1946
- Rank: Major
- Unit: Royal Artillery
- Battles/wars: World War II

Major Arthur Robin Adair CVO MBE (10 February 1913 – 1981), sometimes referred to as Awang A.R. Adair, was a diplomat and formerly the British High Commissioner to Brunei. With nearly four years as High Commissioner for Brunei, he held the record for the longest tenure.

== Early life ==
Adair was born on 10 February 1913, and educated at the Boujeloud School, Queen Elizabeth's Grammar School and completed Emmanuel College with a Bachelor of Arts (BA). He first began work with the Indian Civil Service from 16 September 1937 to 1947. Amid the outbreak of the Second World War, he began serving with the Royal Artillery from 1939 to 1946, and three years as the British Army's assistant and later Deputy Recruiting Officer under Lucknow Recruiting Area. He was commissioned as a second lieutenant in April 1941 and was promoted to temporary Major in February 1944.

From 1944 to 1947, he worked in the District Magistrate and Deputy Commissioner, followed by a short period with the Additional Director of Agriculture on 17 July 1947. He continued work under the Commonwealth Relations Office (CRO) on 1 October 1947, the First Secretary of Dacca from 17 July 1947 to October 1950, established Principal on 28 May 1948, returned to CRO for the second time from 1950 to 1952, transferred to Colombo, Sri Lanka from September 1952 until March 1956, finally going back to CRO for the last time from 1956 to 1960.

== Diplomatic career ==
Adair's diplomatic career began after being appointed as the Deputy High Commissioner in East Pakistan from August 1960 to 1964. Where he would be transferred to the position of Deputy High Commissioner in Nicosia. In December 1967, he was appointed as the high commissioner in Brunei in which he will hold until January 1972. He accompanied Commander J.R. Rogers of HMS Houghton (M1211) to meet Sultan Hassanal Bolkiah during a goodwill visit to the country in 1969. In September 1970, Sir Omar Ali Saifuddien told A.R. Adair that he had made the claim to Limbang in plain view because Abdul Rahman Ya'kub, the Chief Minister of Sarawak, had declared in public that the descendants of Bruneian citizens in Limbang should pledge their full loyalty to Malaysia. A 25 minutes film of the Royal Wedding between Princess Masna and Abdul Aziz was first viewed and watched by Adair and his wife in March 1970. He successfully enforced the 1959 Constitution after a signage between Britain and Brunei on 23 November 1971.

== Death ==
Adair died in 1981.

== Honours ==
Fernley Webber was given the honorary title of Yang Terutama (His Excellency) by the Government of Brunei. He would go on to earn the following awards;

- Royal Victorian Order Commander (CVO; 1961)
- Order of the British Empire Member (MBE; 1947)

Diplomatic posts
Preceded by Fernley Webber	British High Commissioner to Brunei; December 1967 – January 1972	Succeeded by Peter Gautrey
