= Brunei–United Kingdom relations =

- Brunei: United Kingdom

Diplomatic mission
- High Commission: High Commission

Envoy
- High Commissioner Norazmi Muhammad: High Commissioner John Virgoe

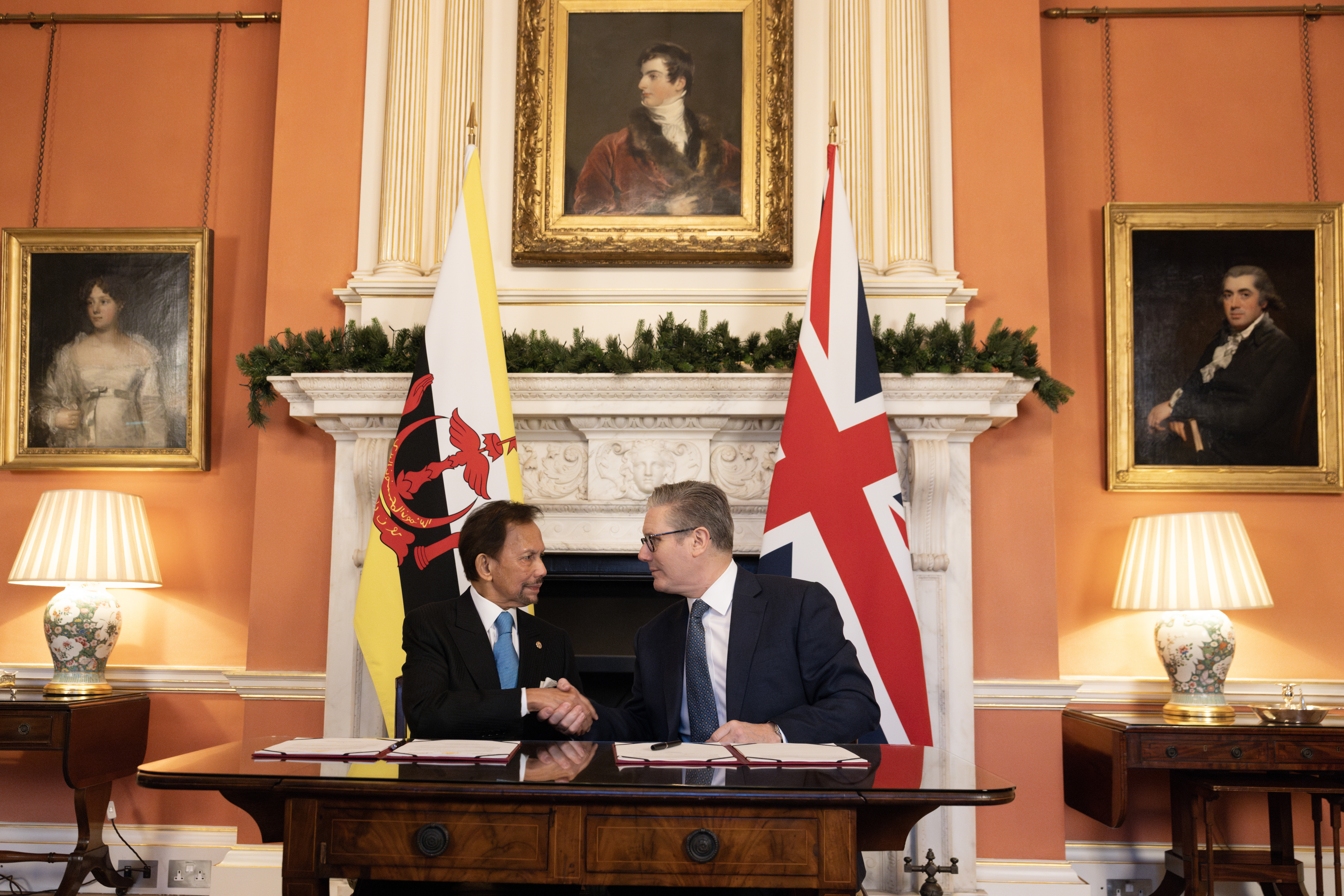
Prime Minister Keir Starmer with Bruneian Sultanate Hassanal Bolkiah in Downing Street, December 2024.

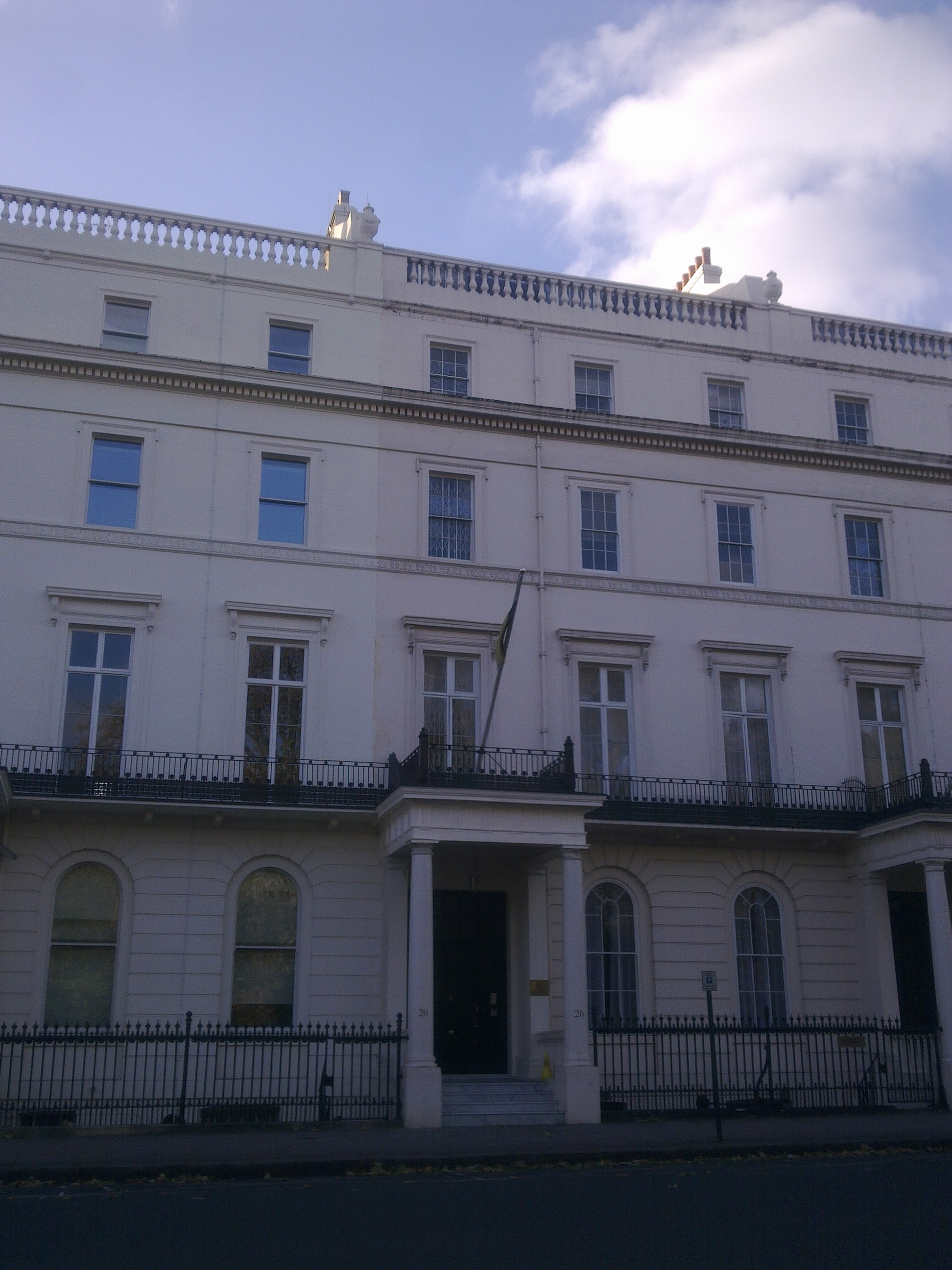
High Commission of Brunei in London

Brunei Darussalam and the United Kingdom of Great Britain and Northern Ireland established diplomatic relations on 1 January 1984. Brunei has a High Commission in London, and United Kingdom has a High Commission in Bandar Seri Begawan. Both countries are members of the Commonwealth and share history and have a friendly and strong relationship, dating back to the 19th century - which includes very strong friendships between both countries' monarchs and royal families.

== Education relations ==
In 2014, there were 1,700–2,000 Bruneians studying in the United Kingdom and there is a connection between both countries' universities, with the United Kingdom being a popular choice for many Bruneians to study in.

== Economic relations ==
In economics, the United Kingdom and Brunei have a bilateral trading relationship. The exports from Brunei to the United Kingdom total about £100 million. The United Kingdom is also actively engaged in encouraging small businesses from Brunei to take their products into international markets. The United Kingdom has signed the accession protocol to join the Comprehensive and Progressive Agreement for Trans-Pacific Partnership, a trade bloc which Brunei is already a part of, which would further enhance and build upon the trading relationship amongst the United Kingdom and Brunei.

== Security relations ==
There are very strong defence relations that date back before the independence of Brunei from the British Empire. The United Kingdom operates a garrison in Brunei, which has British Army and Royal Air Force personnel, which cooperate and help regularly with the Royal Brunei Armed Forces. This defence cooperation includes equipment sales, training, military and intelligence exchanges and assistance and the sharing of experiences. The Sultan of Brunei himself is an honorary Air Chief Marshal of the Royal Air Force and an honorary Admiral of the Royal Navy.

== See also ==
- Accession of the United Kingdom to CPTPP
- Foreign relations of Brunei
- Foreign relations of the United Kingdom
- Free trade agreements of the United Kingdom
- Politics of Brunei
- Politics of the United Kingdom
