= Stanley Tomlinson (diplomat) =

British diplomat (1912–1994)

Sir Stanley Tomlinson KCMG

British High Commissioner to Ceylon
- In office 1966–1969
- Preceded by: Sir Michael Walker
- Succeeded by: Sir Angus Mackintosh

Personal details
- Born: 21 March 1912
- Died: 10 September 1994 (aged 82)
- Education: University of Nottingham
- Occupation: Diplomat

Sir (Frank) Stanley Tomlinson (21 March 1912 – 10 September 1994) was a British diplomat who served as British High Commissioner to Ceylon between 1966 and 1969.

== Early life and education ==
Tomlinson was born on 21 March 1912 in West Yorkshire, the son of J. D. Tomlinson, a police officer, and Mary Tomlinson. He was educated at High Pavement School, Nottingham, and University College, Nottingham where he took a degree in economics. In 1970, Nottingham University awarded him an honorary doctorate of law.

== Career ==
Tomlinson entered the Consular Service in 1935 after competitive examination. He then served in Japan from 1935 to 1941; at Saigon as vice-consul from 1941 to 1942; and in the United States from 1943 to 1945. He was acting consul-general at Manila in 1945 when the War ended and he reopened the British consulate. He was charge d’affaires there in 1946. In 1947, he was at the Foreign Office before he was transferred in 1951 to the Embassy in Washington serving as counsellor until 1954.

After spending a year at Imperial Defence College, Tomlinson was appointed counsellor and head of the South-East Asia Department at the Foreign Office in 1955, remaining in the post until 1958, before serving as deputy commandant of the British sector in Berlin until 1961. He was next minister to the UK permanent delegation to NATO in Paris from 1961 to 1964. He was then consul-general in New York from 1964 to 1966. From 1966 to 1969, he served as British High Commissioner to Ceylon. In 1969, he was appointed deputy under-secretary at the Foreign and Commonwealth Office (Asia, Information and Culture), remaining in the post until his retirement in 1972.

In retirement, Tomlinson served as chairman of civil service selection boards and immigration appeals tribunals. He also rewrote the Foreign and Commonwealth Office's Handbook on Diplomatic Practice.

== Personal life and death ==
Tomlinson married twice. His second wife was Nancy Gleeson-White whom he married in 1959.

Tomlinson died on 10 September 1994, aged 82.

== Honours ==
Tomlinson was appointed Companion of the Order of St Michael and St George (CMG) in the 1954 Birthday Honours, and promoted to Knight Commander (KCMG) in the 1966 Birthday Honours.

== See also ==
- Sri Lanka–United Kingdom relations

Diplomatic posts
Preceded by Sir Michael Walker	British High Commissioner to Ceylon; 1966–1969	Succeeded by Sir Angus Mackintosh
