= Angus MacKay Mackintosh =

British diplomat

Dato Seri Utama Major Sir Angus Mackintosh KCVO CMG DK
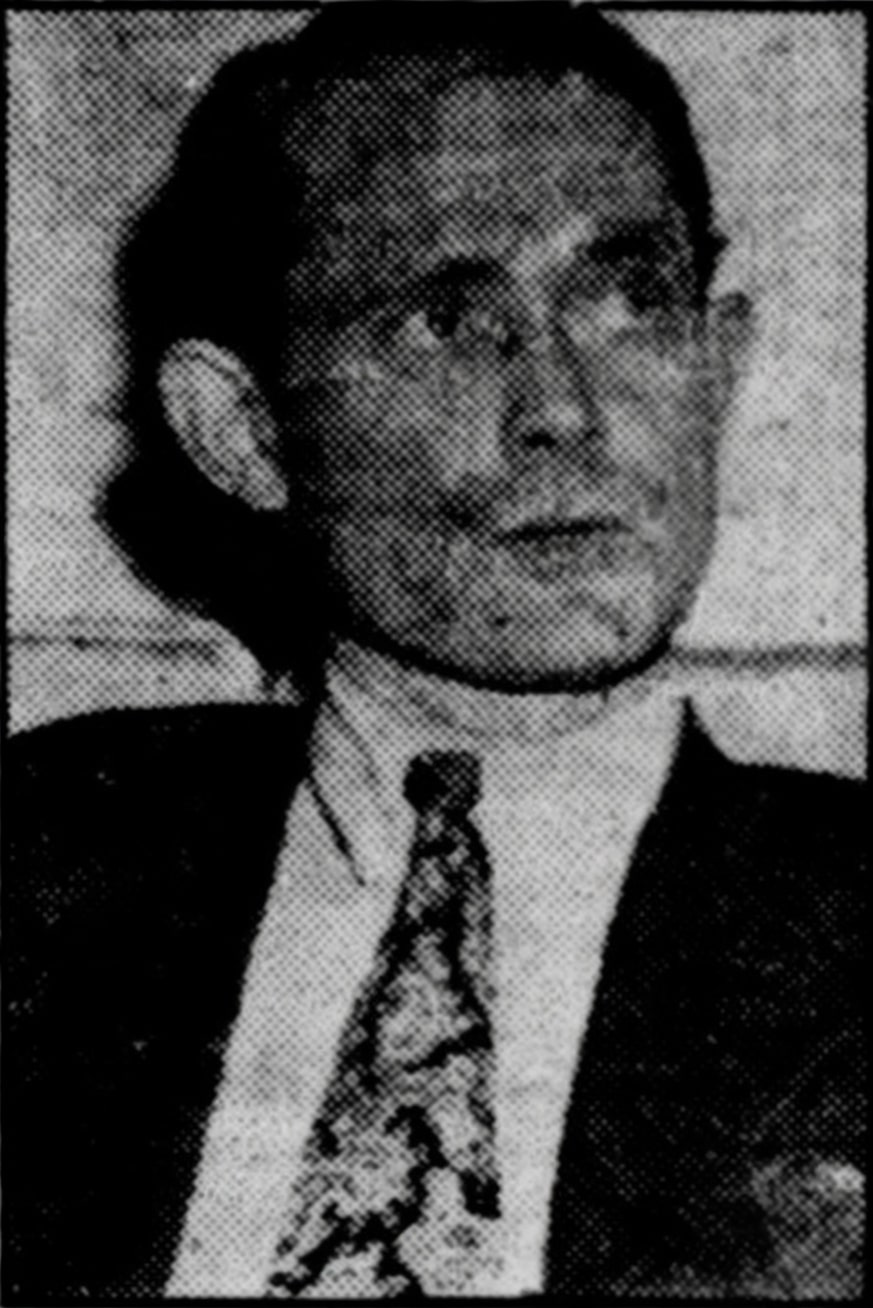
- Mackintosh in 1953

6th British High Commissioner to Ceylon
- In office 25 March 1969 – 1972
- Monarch: Elizabeth II
- Preceded by: Frank Tomlinson
- Succeeded by: Harold Smedley

British Ambassador to the Maldives
- In office 25 March 1969 – 1972
- Preceded by: Frank Tomlinson
- Succeeded by: Harold Smedley

2nd British High Commissioner to Brunei
- In office 1 April 1963 – 9 December 1963
- Preceded by: Dennis White
- Succeeded by: Edgar Laird

Personal details
- Born: 23 July 1915 Inverness, Scotland
- Died: 1987 (aged 71–72)
- Education: [Fettes College, Edinburgh] [University College, Oxford] (MLitt)
- Occupation: Military officer; diplomat

Military service
- Branch/service: British Army
- Years of service: 1942–1945
- Rank: Major
- Unit: Queen's Own Cameron Highlanders
- Battles/wars: World War II

Major Sir Angus MacKay Mackintosh KCVO CMG (23 July 1915 – 1987), sometimes referred to as Inche A.M. Mackintosh, was a diplomat and formerly the British High Commissioner to Brunei, Ceylon and Ambassador to the Maldives.

== Early life ==
Angus Mackintosh was born in Inverness, Scotland on 23 July 1915. Schooled at Fettes College in Edinburgh He gained his Master of Letters (MLitt) from University College, Oxford in 1938. Amid the outbreak of the Second World War, he enlisted into the British Army and went on to serve in the 2nd Battalion of the Queen's Own Cameron Highlanders from 1942 to 1946. Once relieved from duty in 1946, he would begin work in the Colonial Office which would last until 1964. Later on became the Principal Private Secretary to Secretary of State from 1950 until 1953, the Head of the Southeast Asia (later Far East in 1953) Department at the Colonial Office from 1952 to 1955, the Deputy Commissioner-General for the United Kingdom in Southeast Asia from 1956 until 1960, the Head of West Indian Department from 1960 to 1961, and lastly the Cabinet Office from 1961 to 1963.

== Diplomatic career ==
Mackintosh's diplomatic career would kick off once he was appointed as the High Commissioner to Brunei on 1 April 1963. Replacing Dennis White after he announced his retirement due to health concerns. On 31 March, a banquet was hosted at Istana Darul Hana in honour of Dennis White's service and in celebration of Mackintosh's appointment. During his time in Brunei, he became the country's Chief Scout, and took part in national events such as the Sultan Omar Ali Saifuddein III's birthday celebration on 23 September 1963.

Whilst being a diplomat, he worked in the Ministry of Defence from 1964 until 1968, the Assistant Under-Secretary of State's Navy Department from 1965 to 1966, the Senior Civilian Instructor Imperial Defence College from 1966 to 1968, and the Foreign and Commonwealth Office Assistant Under-Secretary of State from 1968 to 1969. He became the United Kingdom's third Ambassador to the Maldives on 25 March 1969, succeeding Frank Stanley Tomlinson. From 1969 until 1972, he was again reappointed as the British High Commissioner to Ceylon.

== Death ==
Angus Mackintosh died in 1987.

== Honours ==
Angus Mackintosh was given the honorary title of Yang Terutama (His Excellency) Dato Seri Utama by Sultan Omar Ali Saifuddien III. He would also earn the following awards:

=== National ===
- Royal Victorian Order Knight Commander (KCVO; 1973) – Sir
- Order of St Michael and St George Companion (CMG; 1958)

=== Foreign ===
- Brunei:
  - Family Order of Seri Utama (DK; 1963) – Dato Seri Utama

Diplomatic posts
Preceded by Frank Tomlinson	British High Commissioner to Ceylon; 25 March 1969 – 1972	Succeeded by Harold Smedley
Preceded by Frank Tomlinson	British Ambassador to the Maldives; 25 March 1969 – 1972	Succeeded by Harold Smedley
Preceded by Dennis White	British High Commissioner to Brunei; 1 April 1963 – 9 December 1963	Succeeded by Edgar Liard
