= Edgar Ord Laird =

British diplomat

Major Edgar Ord Laird CMG MBE
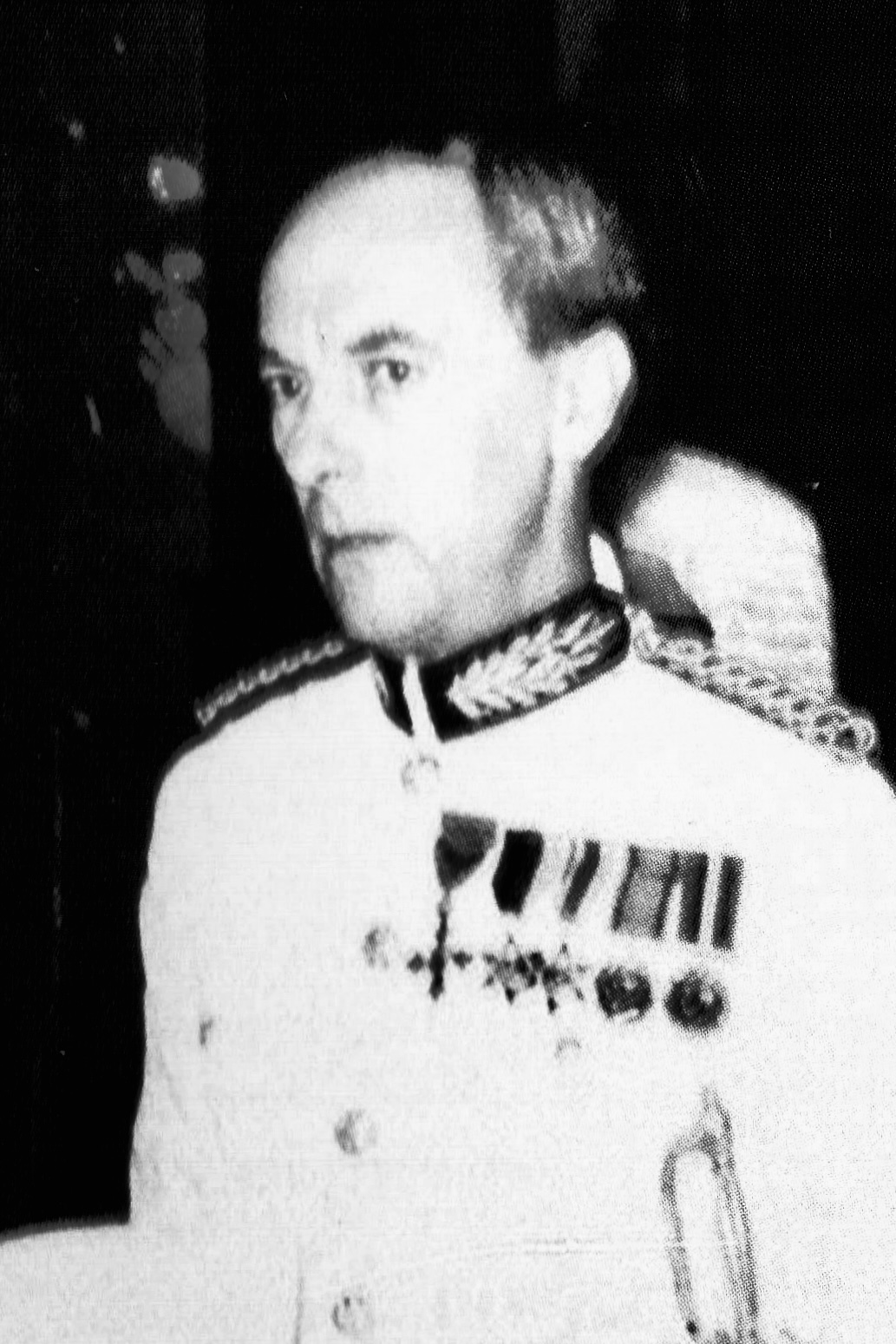
- Laird in 1964

3rd British High Commissioner to Brunei
- In office 9 December 1963 – 1965
- Monarch: Elizabeth II
- Preceded by: Angus Mackintosh
- Succeeded by: Fernley Webber

Personal details
- Born: 16 November 1915 Northumberland, England
- Died: 1992 (aged 77–78)
- Education: Emmanuel College (BA)
- Occupation: Military officer and diplomat

Military service
- Branch/service: British Army
- Years of service: 1939–1946
- Rank: Major
- Unit: Royal Engineers
- Battles/wars: World War II

Major Edgar Ord Laird CMG MBE (16 November 1915 – 1992), sometimes referred to as Awang E.O. Laird, was a diplomat and formerly the British High Commissioner to Brunei.

== Early life ==
Edgar Laird was born in Northumberland on 16 November 1915, and educated at Rossall School from 1924 to 1934 and Emmanuel College from 1935 to 1938. He earned his Bachelor of Arts (BA) in 1938. After graduation he became a surveyor in the Colonial Survey Service and worked in the Uganda Protectorate in February 1939. During World War II, he was commissioned into East African Engineers in October 1939, and later transferred to the British Army's Royal Engineers. Carried out duties in East Africa, Middle East, the United Kingdom and Malaya. Later became the Director of Studies at the Civil Affairs Staff Centre in Wimbledon, August 1944, relieved from duty with the rank of Major in March 1946, appointed to Malayan Civil Service in January 1947.

== Diplomatic career ==
From 1953 to 1955, Laird was appointed as the Secretary of Government and the Secretary for External Defence in the Federation of Malaya in 1956. He would be appointed as the Secretary to the Federation of Malaya Constitutional Commission from August 1956 to February 1957, Deputy Secretary to the Prime Minister's Department in September 1957, only to retire from Overseas Civil Service in January 1958.

On 9 December 1963, Laird succeeded Angus MacKay Mackintosh as the British High Commissioner to Brunei. Prior to Prince Hassanal Bolkiah's departure to the United Kingdom for further studies, him and other dignitaries were present to give their best wishes to him at Berakas Airport on 9 July 1964. In conjunction to the Queen's birthday on 13 June, he presented Inspector Metali bin Osman with the Colonial Police Medal in Brunei Town. At the Berakas Airport on 1 March 1965, he welcomed Prince Philip during his visit to Brunei from Sibu. He would later be assigned as the new Deputy High Commissioner to Nigeria, therefore replaced by Fernley Douglas Webber on 1 August 1965.

== Death ==
Edgar Laird died in 1992.

== Honours ==
Edgar Laird was given the honorary title of Yang Terutama (His Excellency) by Sultan Omar Ali Saifuddien III.

- Order of the British Empire Member (MBE)
- Order of St Michael and St George Companion (CMG)

Diplomatic posts
Preceded by Angus Mackintosh	British High Commissioner to Brunei; 9 December 1963 – 1965	Succeeded by Fernley Webber
