= John Virgoe =

British diplomat

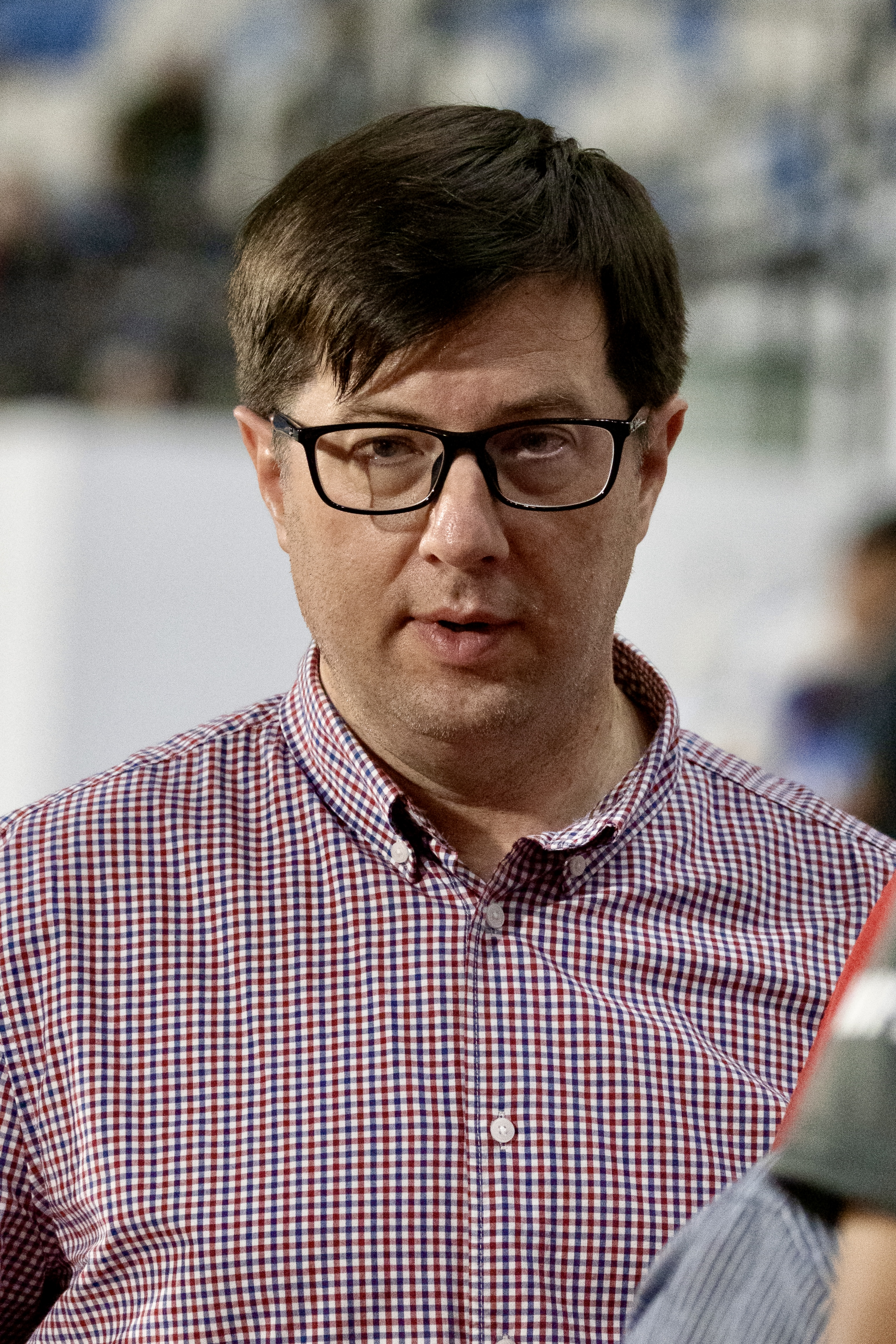
- Virgoe in 2024

19th British High Commissioner to Brunei
- In office August 2020 – August 2024
- Monarch: Elizabeth II
- Preceded by: Richard Lindsay
- Succeeded by: Alexandra McKenzie

Personal details
- Born: 1 September 1969 (age 57)
- Spouse: Tuti Suwidjiningsih
- Children: 2
- Education: University of Cambridge (MA); Princeton University (MPP)
- Occupation: Diplomat

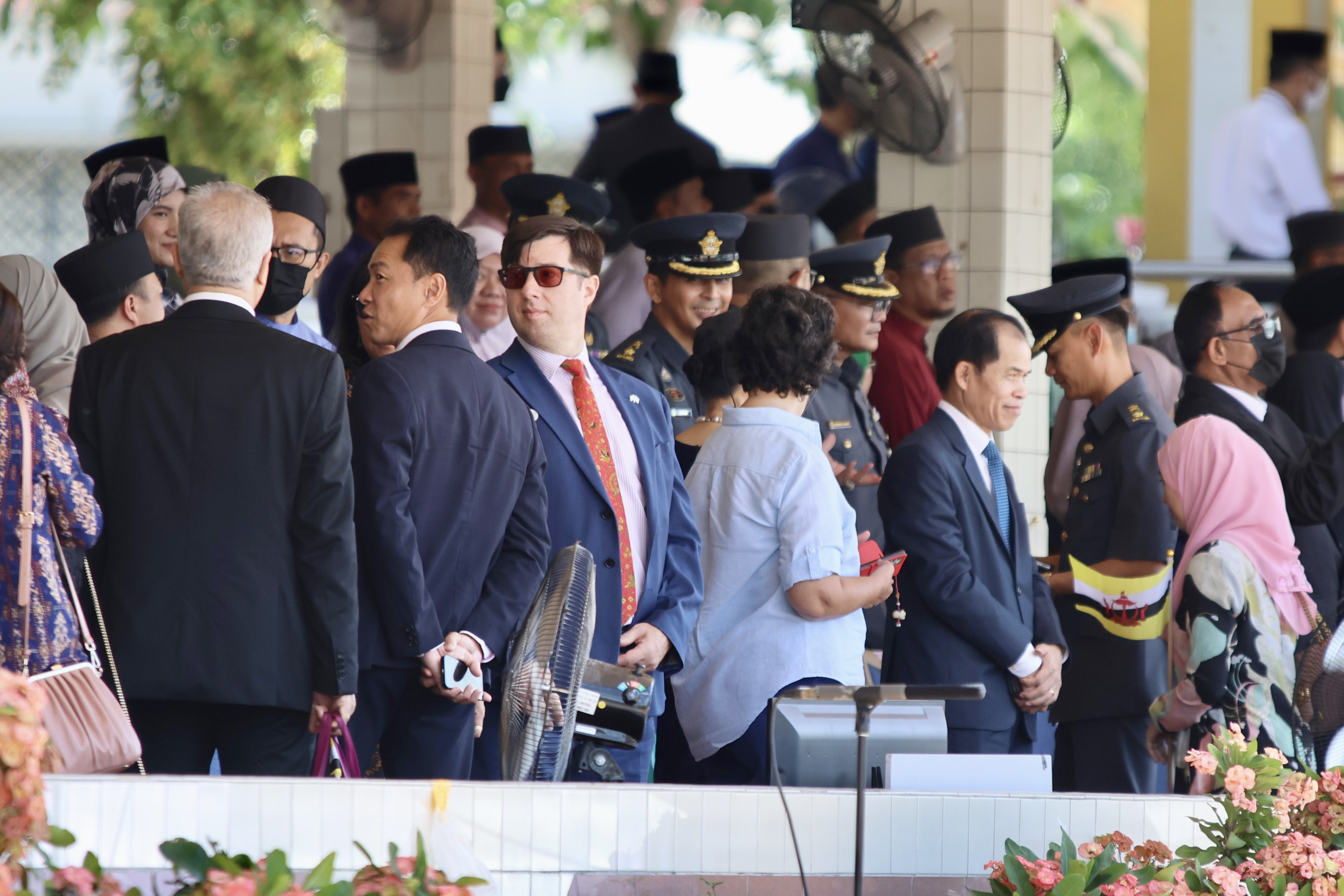
Virgoe (in glasses) during 2023 National Day of Brunei

John Leonard Pencavel Virgoe (born 1 September 1969) is a diplomat and was the British High Commissioner to Brunei from 2020 to 2024. He has expertise in economic diplomacy, climate change, and Southeast Asia.

== Early life and education ==
Virgoe was educated at Norwich School and Corpus Christi College, Cambridge, where he studied for a Master of Arts degree (MA) in Theology and Religious Studies between 1988 and 1991. He then pursued a Master of Public Policy (MPP) at the Woodrow Wilson School of International Affairs Princeton University from 2006 to 2007.

== Diplomatic career ==
Earlier postings include Deputy Permanent Representative to the United Nations Environment Programme and UN-Habitat in Nairobi from 2002 to 2006, and various roles at the FCO from 1999 to 2002, including Head of the Crisis Management Section in the Counter-Terrorism Policy Department and subsequently Head of the China Section in the China Hong Kong Department. He also served as Second Secretary for Political Affairs in Jakarta from 1995 to 1999.

Since 2017, Virgoe has held the position of Head of the South-East Asia Department at the Foreign and Commonwealth Office (FCO). Prior to this, from 2015 to 2017, he served as the Head of the Joint Anti-Corruption Unit at the Cabinet Office, and in 2015, he held the role of deputy director in the Spending Review at the Finance Directorate of the FCO. From 2013 to 2015, he was Joint Head of the Policy Unit at the FCO. His previous assignments include serving as First Secretary for Economic and Climate Change in Canberra from 2009 to 2013, and as Director for South-East Asia at the International Crisis Group from 2007 to 2009 (on leave from the FCO). He has been deployed four times abroad, most recently to Jakarta, Nairobi, and Canberra.

Virgoe was named the UK's nominee high commissioner to Brunei by the FCO in July 2020. He would succeed Richard Lindsay, who has been in Brunei since 2017, who is moving on to a different diplomatic posting. Brunei is the UK's "closest friend in the region," according to Virgoe, as their bilateral relations have been stronger over the last year, also expressing gratitude to Brunei for helping the UK become the eleventh conversation partner of ASEAN.

On 7 February 2023, Virgoe accompanied Anne-Marie Trevelyan, Minister of State for Indo-Pacific, during her visit to Brunei. Following Virgoe, Alexandra McKenzie has been named as the successor and will begin her position in August 2024.

Virgoe was succeeded by Alexandra McKenzie, who took up her appointment in August 2024.

== Personal life ==
His full name is John Leonard Pencavel Virgoe, he is married to Tuti Suwidjiningsih, and they have two children together.

Diplomatic posts
Preceded by Richard Lindsay	British High Commissioner to Brunei; August 2020 – August 2024	Succeeded by Alexandra McKenzie
