= List of high commissioners of the United Kingdom to Brunei =

High Commissioner of the United Kingdom to Brunei
- Royal arms of His Majesty's Government
- Incumbent; Alexandra McKenzie since August 2024
- Foreign, Commonwealth and Development Office; British High Commission, Bandar Seri Begawan
- Style: Her Excellency
- Reports to: Secretary of State for Foreign, Commonwealth and Development Affairs
- Residence: Bandar Seri Begawan
- Appointer: The Crown on advice of the prime minister
- Term length: At His Majesty's pleasure
- Precursor: British Resident
- Inaugural holder: Dennis Charles White; First High Commissioner to Brunei
- Formation: 29 September 1959
- Website: British High Commission – Bandar Seri Begawan

The high commissioner from the United Kingdom to Brunei is the United Kingdom's foremost diplomatic representative in Brunei, and in charge of the United Kingdom's diplomatic mission in Brunei.

== History ==
Brunei was a British protectorate from 1888 until the state gained full independence on 1 January 1984. As fellow members of the Commonwealth of Nations, the United Kingdom and Brunei exchange high commissioners rather than ambassadors. In 1958 the constitution was changed, the post of British resident was abolished and the full on British high commission for Brunei was established. Sir Dennis Charles White, who had been appointed as resident the previous year, became the first high commissioner under the new Constitution.

== List of high commissioners ==
No.	Name	Took office	Left office	Monarch	Ref
1	Dennis Charles White	29 September 1959	31 March 1963	Elizabeth II	
2	Angus MacKay Mackintosh	1 April 1963	9 December 1963	Elizabeth II	
3	Edgar Ord Laird	9 December 1963	1965	Elizabeth II	
4	Fernley Douglas Webber	1 August 1965	October 1967	Elizabeth II	
5	Arthur Robin Adair	December 1967	January 1972	Elizabeth II	
6	Peter Gautrey	12 January 1972	14 January 1975	Elizabeth II	
7	James Alfred Davidson	January 1975	1978	Elizabeth II	
8	Arthur Christopher Watson	October 1978	31 December 1983	Elizabeth II	
9	Robert Francis Cornish	6 November 1983	5 August 1986	Elizabeth II	
10	Roger Westbrook	1986	1991	Elizabeth II	
11	Adrian Sindall	1991	1994	Elizabeth II	
12	Ivan Roy Callan	1994	1998	Elizabeth II	
13	Stuart Laing	1998	2002	Elizabeth II	
14	Andrew Caie	January 2002	2005	Elizabeth II	
15	John Saville	2005	2009	Elizabeth II	
16	Rob Fenn	2009	2013	Elizabeth II	
17	David Campbell	2013	2017	Elizabeth II	
18	Richard Lindsay	2017	2020	Elizabeth II	
19	John Virgoe	August 2020	August 2024	Elizabeth II	
20	Alexandra McKenzie	August 2024	present	Charles III	

== See also ==
- List of administrators of British Brunei
- Brunei–United Kingdom relations
- Foreign relations of Brunei
- List of high commissioners of Brunei to the United Kingdom
