= Fernley Webber =

British diplomat

Major Fernley Webber CMG TD MC
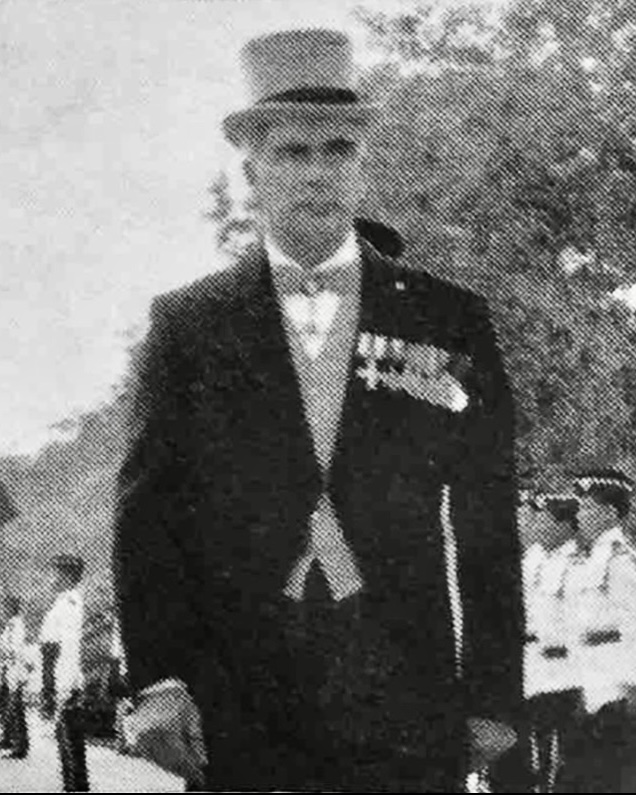
- Fernley Webber in 1965

4th British High Commissioner to Brunei
- In office 1 August 1965 – October 1967
- Monarch: Elizabeth II
- Preceded by: Edgar Liard
- Succeeded by: Arthur Adair

Personal details
- Born: 12 March 1918
- Died: 1991 (aged 73–74)
- Education: Jesus College (BA)
- Occupation: Military officer and diplomat

Military service
- Branch/service: British Army
- Years of service: 1940–1945
- Rank: Major
- Battles/wars: World War II

Major Fernley Douglas Webber CMG TD MC (12 March 1918 – 1991), sometimes referred to as Awang F.D. Webber, was a British diplomat and formerly the British High Commissioner to Brunei.

== Early life ==
Webber was born on 12 March 1918, and educated at Cotham Secondary School in Bristol. He obtained his Bachelor of Arts (BA) degree at Jesus College, Cambridge, and began work with the Colonial Office in 1939. Amid the outbreak of the Second World War, he served in the military from 1940 until 1945, earning the rank of Major. After his time in the military, he worked as the Private secretary to Minister of State Colonial Office, as Assistant Secretary in 1950, as Establishment Officer Colonial Office from 1950 to 1958, and lastly the Head of East Africa Department Colonial Office from 1958 to 1965.

== Diplomatic career ==
Webber's diplomatic career began after being appointed as the Deputy High Commissioner to Kuching in 1965. On 1 August 1965, he became the new high commissioner to Brunei, replacing Edgar O. Liard. During his time in Brunei, he attended key events such as the wedding of Princess Nor'ain in August 1967. Early that year in February, he gave the reassurance of the British government being keen on seeing positive constitutional changes in Brunei. In conjunction to the 1967 Birthday Honours, he awarded the Order of the British Empire Commander (CBE) to Brunei Financial Officer, John Lee. Notably, Webber was appointed as Brunei's Scout Chief.

He was transferred to the British High Commission in Canberra in October 1967. Sultan Omar Ali Saifuddien III was worried when the Commonwealth Office informed him that F.D. Webber would be moving to Australia. The Sultan wanted him to stay because he was concerned that if the High Commissioner changed, the Commonwealth Office would adopt a much stricter stance regarding Brunei's constitutional progress. Consequently, the Sultan's attempt in revoking Webber's transfer was unsuccessful.

== Death ==
Webber died in 1991.

== Honours ==
Fernley Webber was given the honorary title of Yang Terutama (His Excellency) by the Government of Brunei. He would go on to earn the following awards;

- Order of St Michael and St George Companion (CMG; 1959)
- Territorial Decoration (TD; 1942)
- Military Cross (MC; 1954)

Diplomatic posts
Preceded by Edgar Liard	British High Commissioner to Brunei; 1 August 1965 – October 1967	Succeeded by Arthur Adair
