= William Williams (Methodist) =

Naturalist and Wesleyan Methodist minister

William Williams FLS (1848 – 6 July 1913) was a naturalist and Wesleyan Methodist minister in Australia. He was elected president-general of the Methodist Church of Australasia for the years 1907–1910.

== History ==
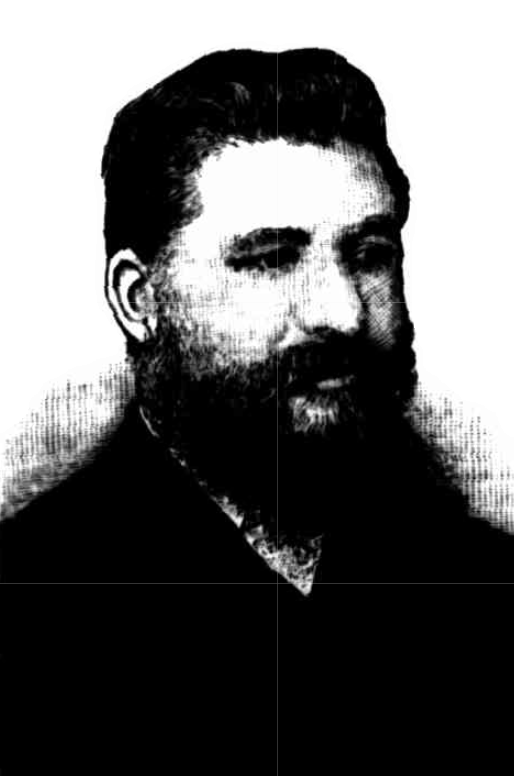
Rev. William Williams FLS

Williams was born in Kooringa, South Australia, and grew up at the nearby Burra Mines, receiving his early education from (later Dr) John Riccardo Stephens and at the local public school. He trained for the ministry in Adelaide, then at the Wesleyan conference in 1869 he was accepted as a probationer and immediately sent to Daylesford, Victoria, where the minister was Rev. R. C. Flockart, later the first Methodist Chaplain-General of Australia. After a year, he was sent to the St Arnaud circuit in the Northern Grampians, where he was given the task of missionary work in Carr's Plains country, and established a flourishing church on Mogg's Plains, now known as Swanwater, 18km north-west of St Arnaud. His next posting was to Wandiligong, in the Ovens circuit, completing his probation, and was "admitted to the connexion by ordination" at the 1873 Conference and posted to El Dorado, in the same region.

A year later he was appointed superintendent of the Sale circuit, in the Gippsland region, and was able to breathe new life into its dwindling congregation and restore its failing finances. Two years at Bairnsdale topped off his country obligations, then he was brought into the city — first to Brunswick Street, Fitzroy, for three years, then another three on the Dunolly circuit, and Lydiard Street, Ballarat, staying for a year at Sebastopol, followed by Pleasant Street. The Sandhurst circuit followed, initially resident in Eaglehawk, then as circuit superintendent at Forest Street. In 1891 he was posted to the Jubilee Church, Toorak, at the corner of Toorak and Williams roads — an intellectually and spiritually superior establishment, but in a depressed condition due to the chronic illness of his predecessor.

He was elected president of the Victorian Methodist Conference in 1903.

=== Naturalist ===
Williams took a deep interest in science generally and zoology in particular, and was an expert microscopist. While in Ballarat he was elected vice president of the Field Club and Science Society, having been introduced by Professor Mica Smith, the metallurgist.

- When he moved to Sandhurst (later Bendigo) he was welcomed to the local Science Society there, and served as a committee member for the duration of his residency.
- He was a corresponding member of the Field Naturalists' and Science Club attached to the Gordon Technical College, Geelong, and was elected to membership of the Royal Society of Victoria.
- While in Sandhurst he was accepted as a member of the Linnean Society of London, having been sponsored by P. H. MacGillivray, Ferdinand Von Mueller, and J. Bracebridge Wilson.

Papers he read to scientific bodies in Australia include:

- Spiders (before the Science Society)

== Personal ==
Williams married Edith Skelton "Edie" Wimble on 14 July 1880. His last address was "Kooringa" 82 Victoria Road, Auburn.

His remains were buried at the Boroondara Cemetery, Kew, Victoria. Edith Skelton Williams, his widow, married again, to Rev. W. H. Fitchett on 31 March 1920.
