= Basil George Watson =

Australian aviator (1893–1917)

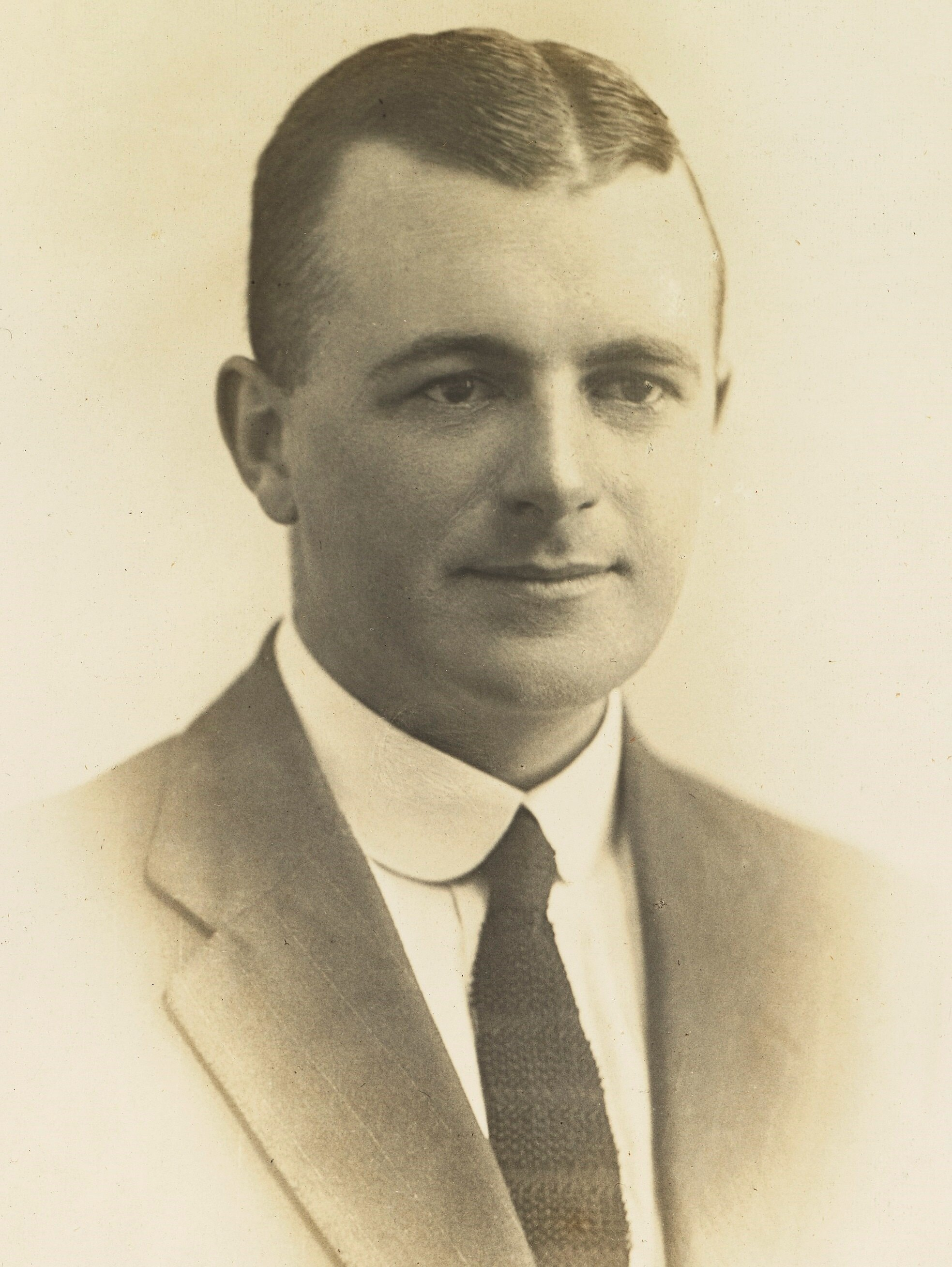
- Basil Watson, 1917.
- Born: 12 October 1893; Bendigo, Victoria, Australia
- Died: 28 March 1917 (aged 23); Point Cook, Victoria, Australia
- Cause of death: aeroplane crash
- Burial place: Boroondara Cemetery
- Occupation(s): aircraft engineer, constructor, and pilot

Basil George Watson (12 October 1893 – 28 March 1917) was an Australian aviation pioneer who died in an aeroplane crash while testing his self-constructed plane on the day before a Red Cross fund-raising carnival at which he was scheduled to give a display of aerobatics.

== Family ==
The son of James Isaac Watson (1865-1944), and Isabel Ada Watson (1867-1952), née Knight — and the grandson of the mining magnate, John Boyd Watson, and nephew of the Australian cricketer Billy Murdoch — Basil George Watson was born in Bendigo on 12 October 1893.

== Education ==
Watson and his two brothers — Eric James Watson (1892-1964) and James Rudyard Watson (1900-1959) — attended Haileybury College at Brighton Beach, Victoria.

== Aviator ==
Watson's family had an early interest in Aviation. On Monday morning, 21 March 1910, some 30 spectators witnessed Harry Houdini make an extended flight at Diggers Rest of 7min. 37secs., covering at least 6 miles, at altitudes ranging from 20ft. to 100ft. Basil Watson's father, mother, and younger sister, Venora, then aged 14, were among the spectators; (Note: In order to be present at Houdini's 6:45AM first flight, the Watsons would have had to have left Brighton Beach somewhere near 4AM.) and their names were included in the list of 16 spectator signatures on the certificate that verified Houdini's achievement.

=== England ===
Watson travelled to England in 1914 on the S.S. Mooltan (Note: N.B. not the RMS Mooltan built in 1923; see The S.S. Mooltan of 1905, The Old Peninsular & Oriental Steam Navigation Company (c1835-1972).) — in the company of two other Australian aviators, Harry Hawker and Harry Kauper — and, upon the recommendation of Hawker, he joined the Sopwith Aviation Company as an engineer (where he was able to learn about the latest trends in aviation and aviation technology) and, at the same time, he undertook flying lessons. Watson received his official aviator’s certificate following his training with the Hall School of Flying at the London Aerodrome, at Hendon, in October 1915.

Soon he was employed as a military test pilot. However, following the injuries he sustained in a crash on 22 June 1915, he was declared medically unfit for service; and he returned to Australia.

Watson . . . was seconded as a test pilot to the Imperial Army being based at Brooklands airfield, where he undertook trial flights of new aircraft.
On a fateful test flight on 22 June 1915, Watson took off from Brooklands piloting a new Sopwith aircraft powered by a 150 h.p., Sunbeam V-8 engine.
He had barely cleared the airfield climbing to just 150 ft when four cylinders suddenly failed, causing the engine to seize and the plane began rapidly descending.
With no time to turn the plane around and return to the airfield, Watson narrowly avoided a house and steered for gap in the heavy tree cover, but collided with a tree trunk at 90 miles per hour.
He was fortunate to escape with a nasty gash on his head, a few cuts and bruises and a severe case of concussion.
Although he would fully recover after several month convalescence, Watson was ruled medically unfit for further service, bringing to a premature end his hopes of an extended military aviation career.

=== Australia ===
Upon his return to Australia, he began constructing his own biplane, using a Gnome rotary engine he had purchased from Horrie Miller, and "modelled on the Sopwith Scout", at Follacleugh, in St Kilda Street, Elsternwick, the family residence; and, at the end of 1916, he received permission to test his plane — which he flew between Point Cook, Bendigo, and Melbourne.

In 1917 he set up an air mail experiment, where he delivered 1,300 postcards to Melbourne from Mount Gambier. Discussions begun to expand the service to other towns.

== Death ==
"1917. 28th. March.—Sensational aviation tragedy near Point Cook. The Victorian aviator, Basil Watson, killed by a fall of 2,000 feet caused by the collapse of his bi-plane." — Victorian Year Book 1917-18.

Watson, promoted as "The Wizard of the Void", "The Athlete of the Sky", and "The Magician of the Air", was scheduled to demonstrate his flying prowess and aerobatic skills at a special fund-raising carnival for the Red Cross to be held at Caulfield Racecourse on Thursday 29 March 1917. He died on Wednesday, 28 March 1917, the day before the event, at the age of 23, when his aeroplane crashed in Port Phillip Bay.

On 28 March, Watson arranged to make a test flight from Albert Park to Point Cook, where he could leave the plane in one of the hangars overnight.
Arriving over Point Cook around 3:40 pm, Watson proceeded to entertain soldiers stationed at an adjoining A.I.F. camp with a display of his typical aerobatic feats.
Having successfully completed a "loop the loop", he banked the plane to enter a steep dive at 2000 ft (600 m), when suddenly a small clip securing part of the aircraft gave way and the wings appeared to fold back on themselves, causing the aircraft to plummet headlong towards the ground.
Watson could be seen desperately trying to regain control, before realising that all hope was lost, and instead steering the plane away from the crowd of thousands of spectators.
The aircraft plunged into the sea almost nose first, crumpling on impact in less than a metre of water close to the shoreline.
Basil Watson was severely injured and died moments later as the first witnesses arrived on the scene wading out to the wreckage.

=== Burial ===
He was buried at Boroondara General Cemetery, Kew, two days later.

"At the same time as the funeral in Melbourne, the bells of St Paul's Cathedral in Bendigo played the hymn Rock of Ages; the fire bell, which had previously rung to alert Bendigonians to the arrival of Watson and his plane also rang to mourn his passing." (Terri-Anne Kingsley, 2016)

== Gallery ==
External image
- Official Souvenir Australian Aerial Mail postcard: Watson's Flight Mt Gambier to Melbourne, February 1917.

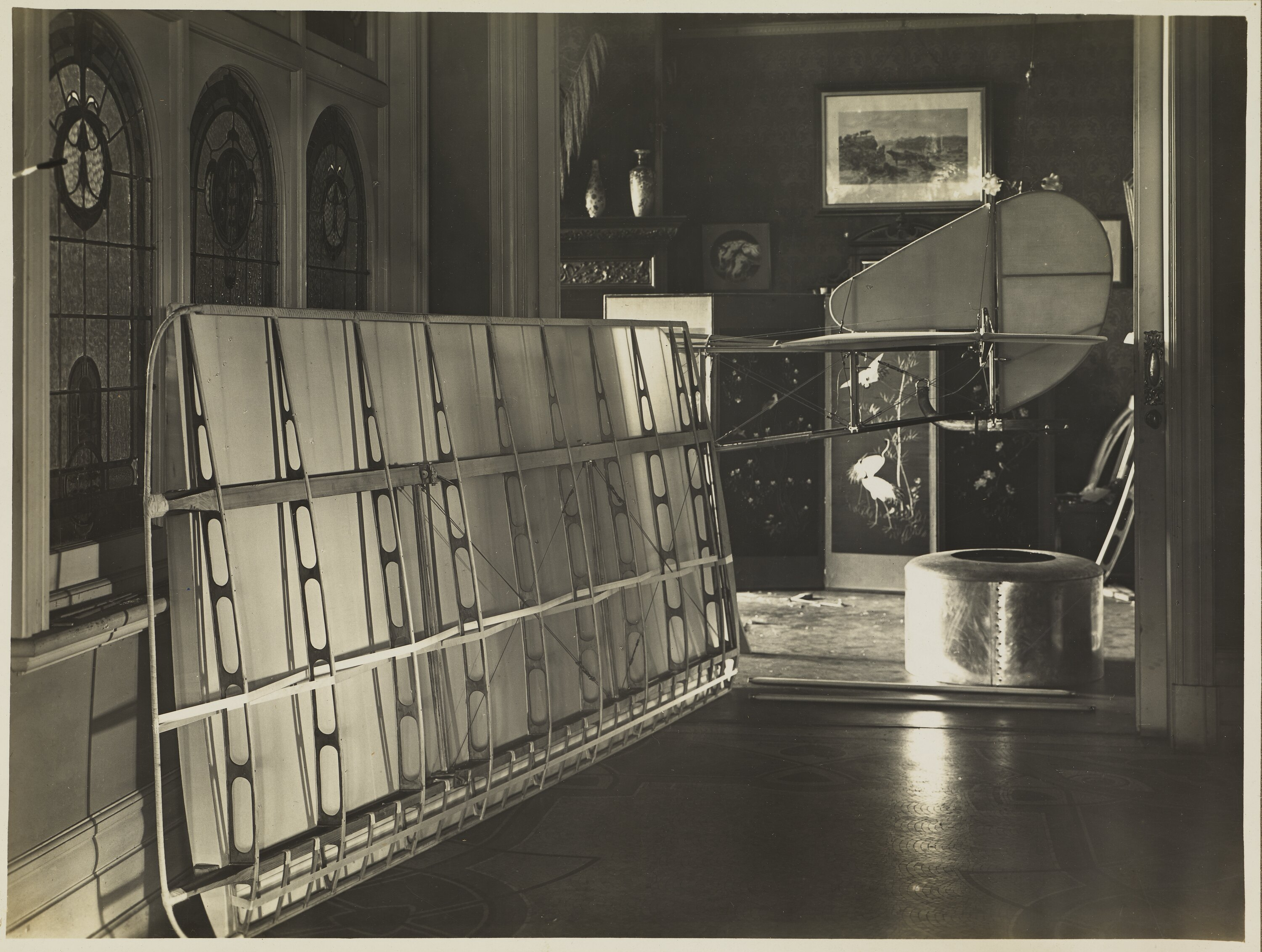
Partially Constructed Wing, Fuselage, and Engine Cowling of Watson's Biplane, Follacleugh, Elsternwick 1916.

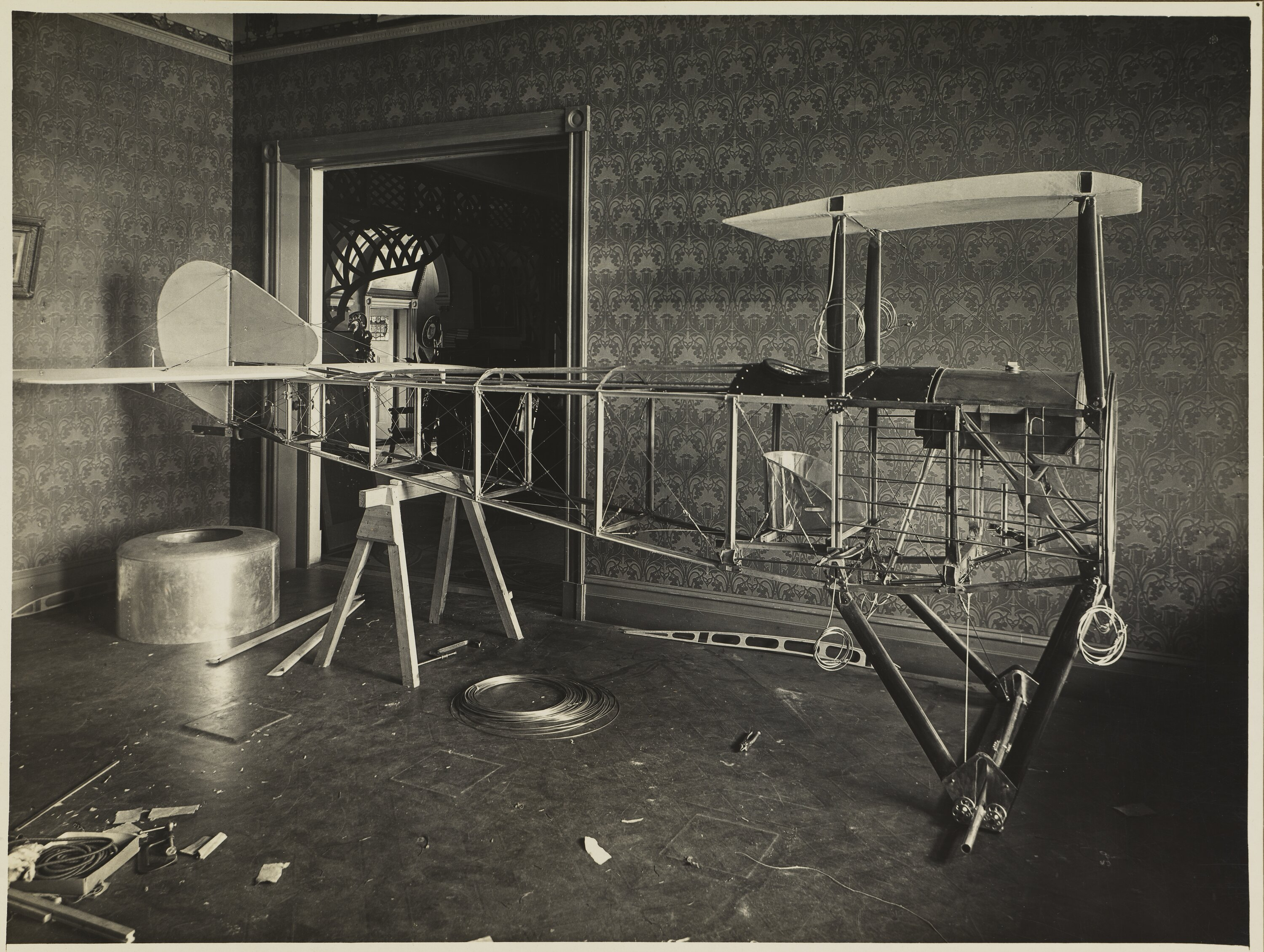
Fuselage of Watson's Partially Constructed Biplane, Follacleugh, Elsternwick, 1916.

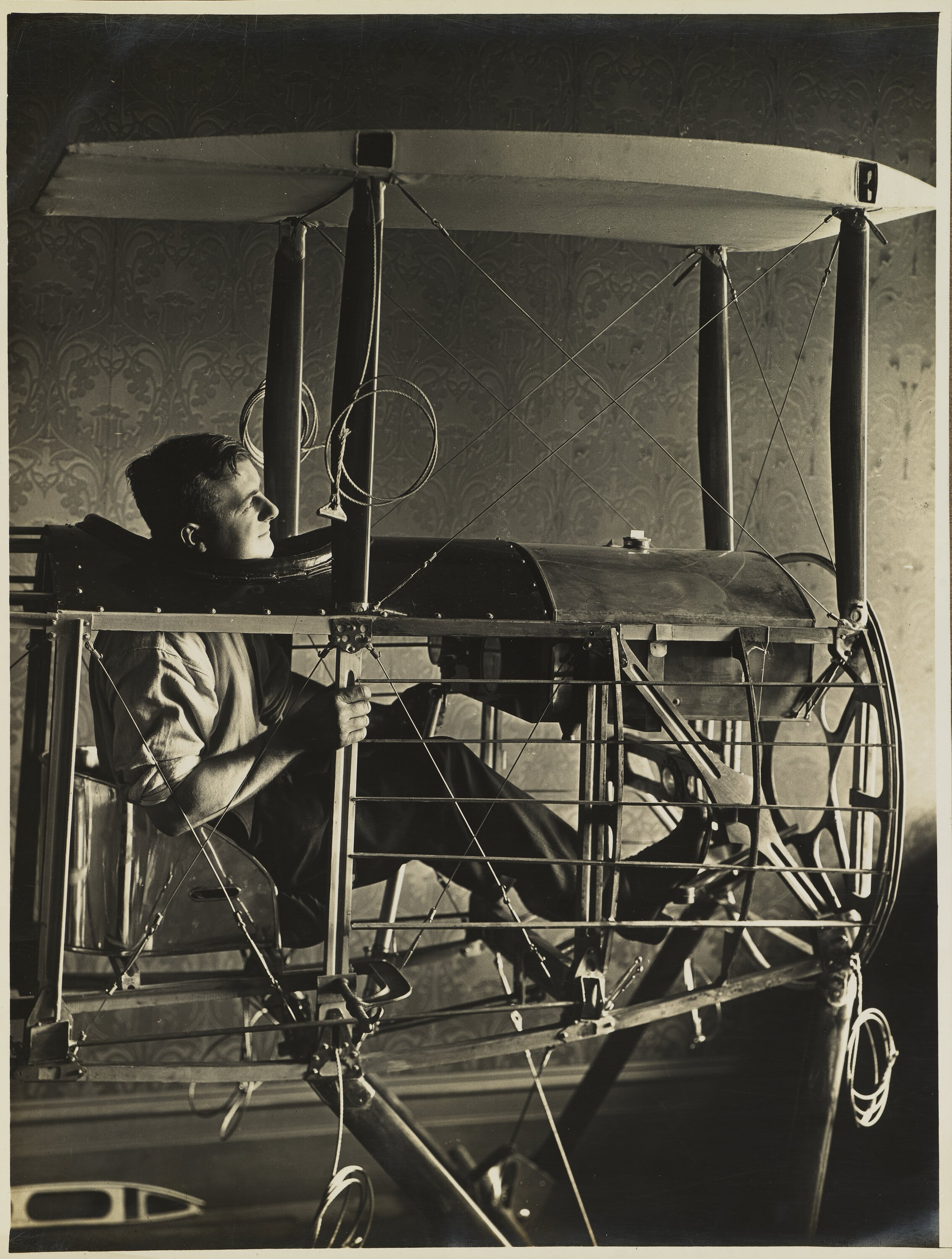
Watson Seated in the Cockpit of his Partially Constructed Biplane Fuselage, Follacleugh, Elsternwick, 1916.

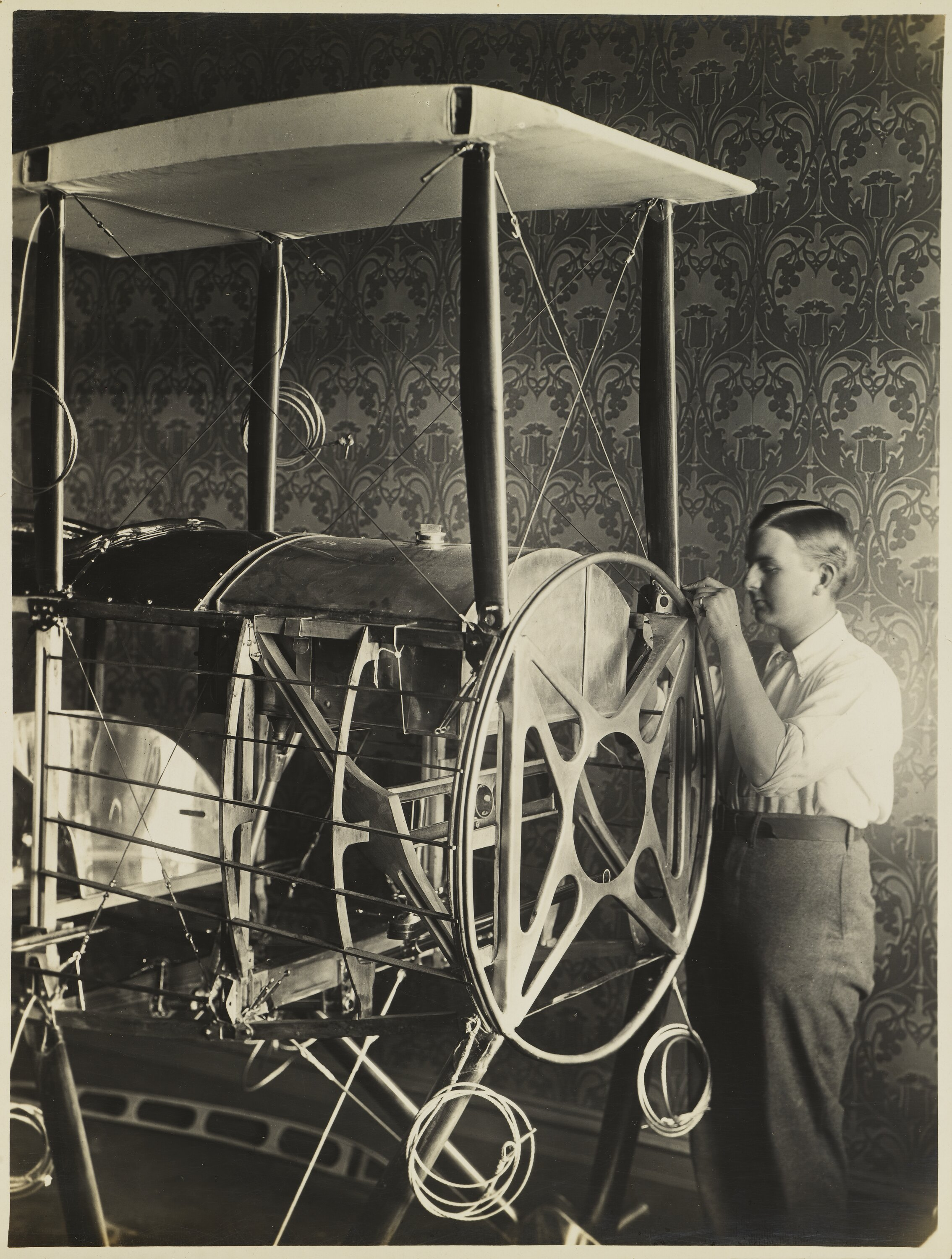
Watson Fitting the Engine Mounting Frame to his Partially Constructed Biplane, Follacleugh, Elsternwick, 1916.

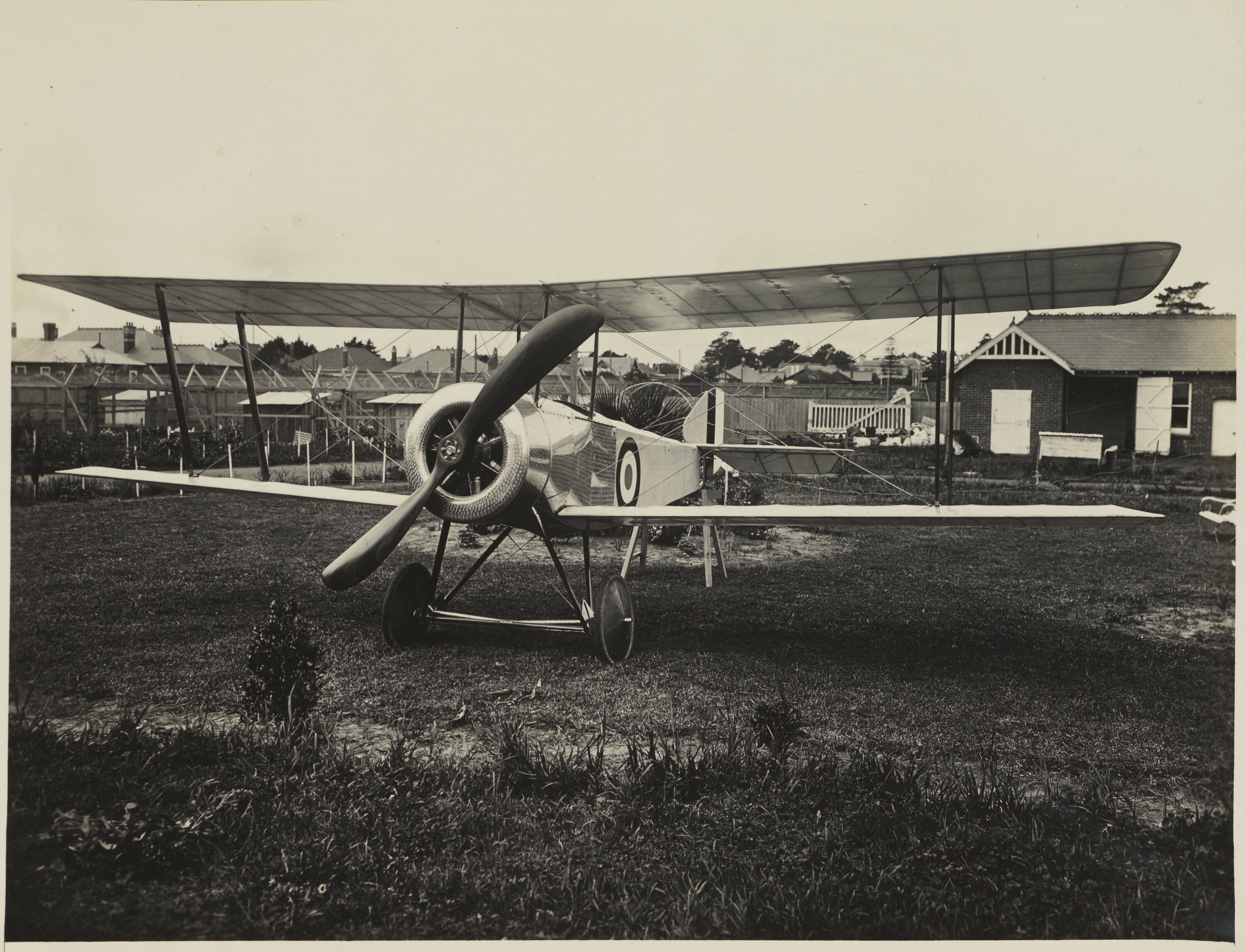
Oblique Front View of Basil Watson's Biplane, rear lawn, Follacleugh, Elsternwick, 1916.

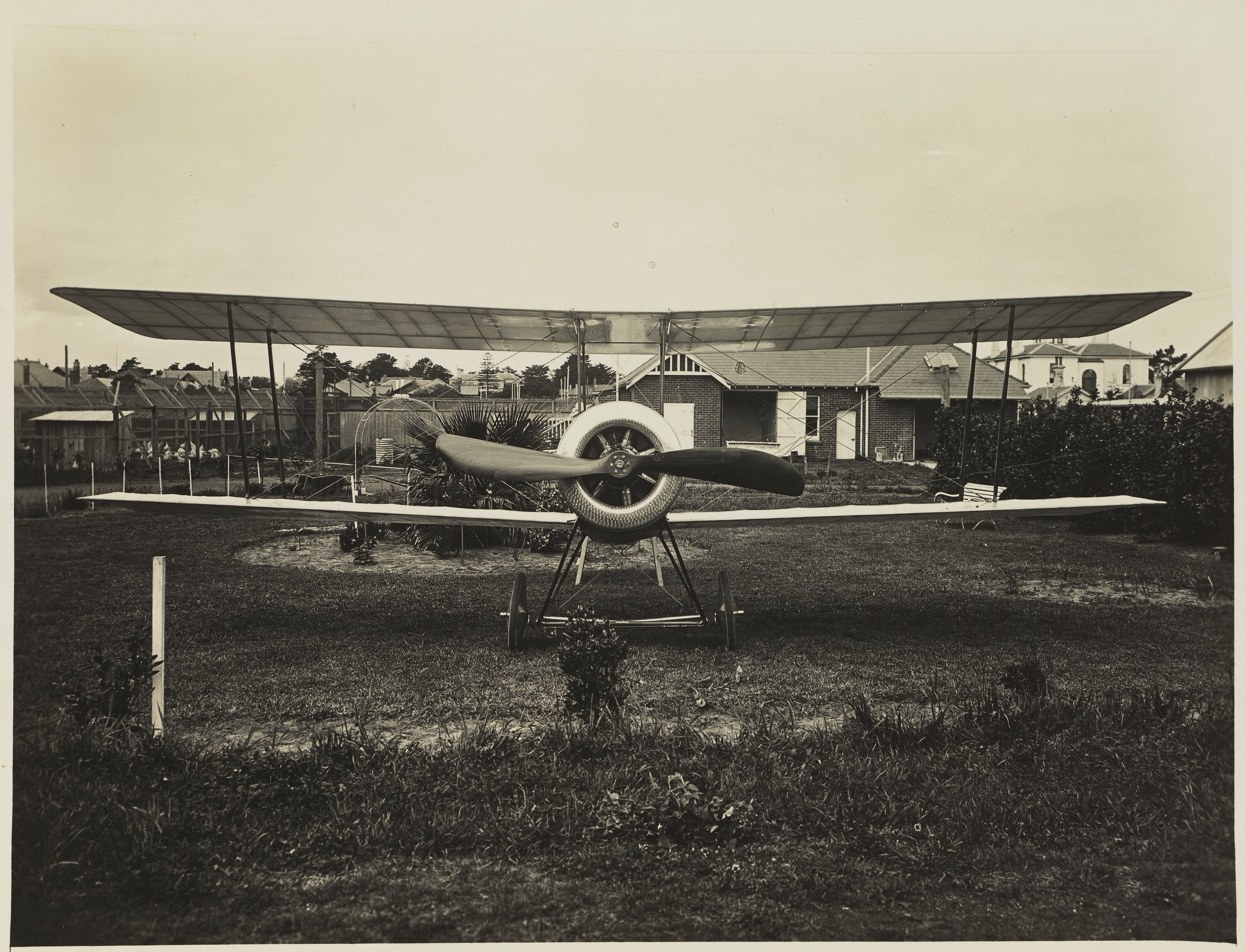
Front View of Basil Watson's Biplane, rear lawn, Follacleugh, Elsternwick, 1916.

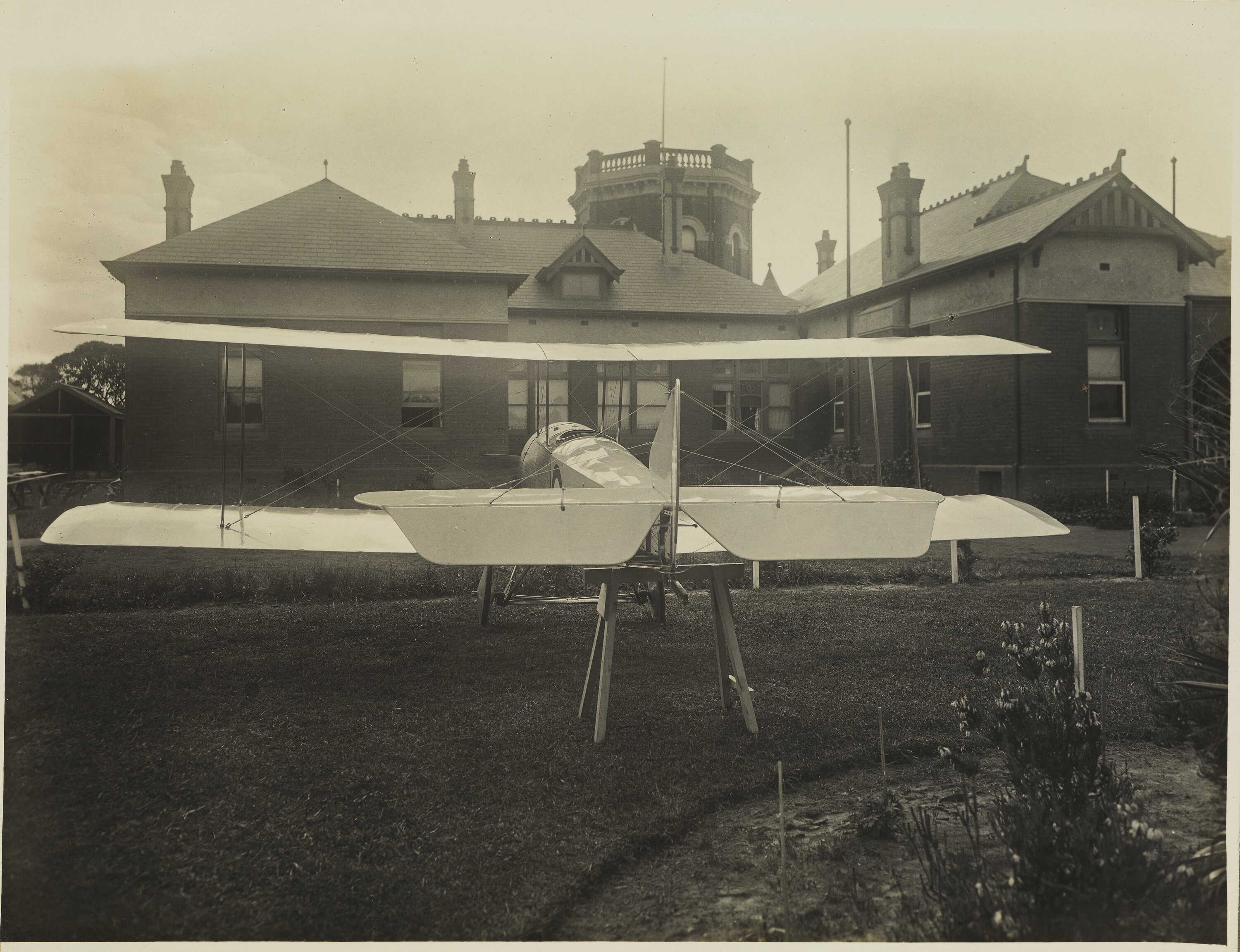
Rear View of Basil Watson's Biplane, rear lawn, Follacleugh, Elsternwick, 1916.

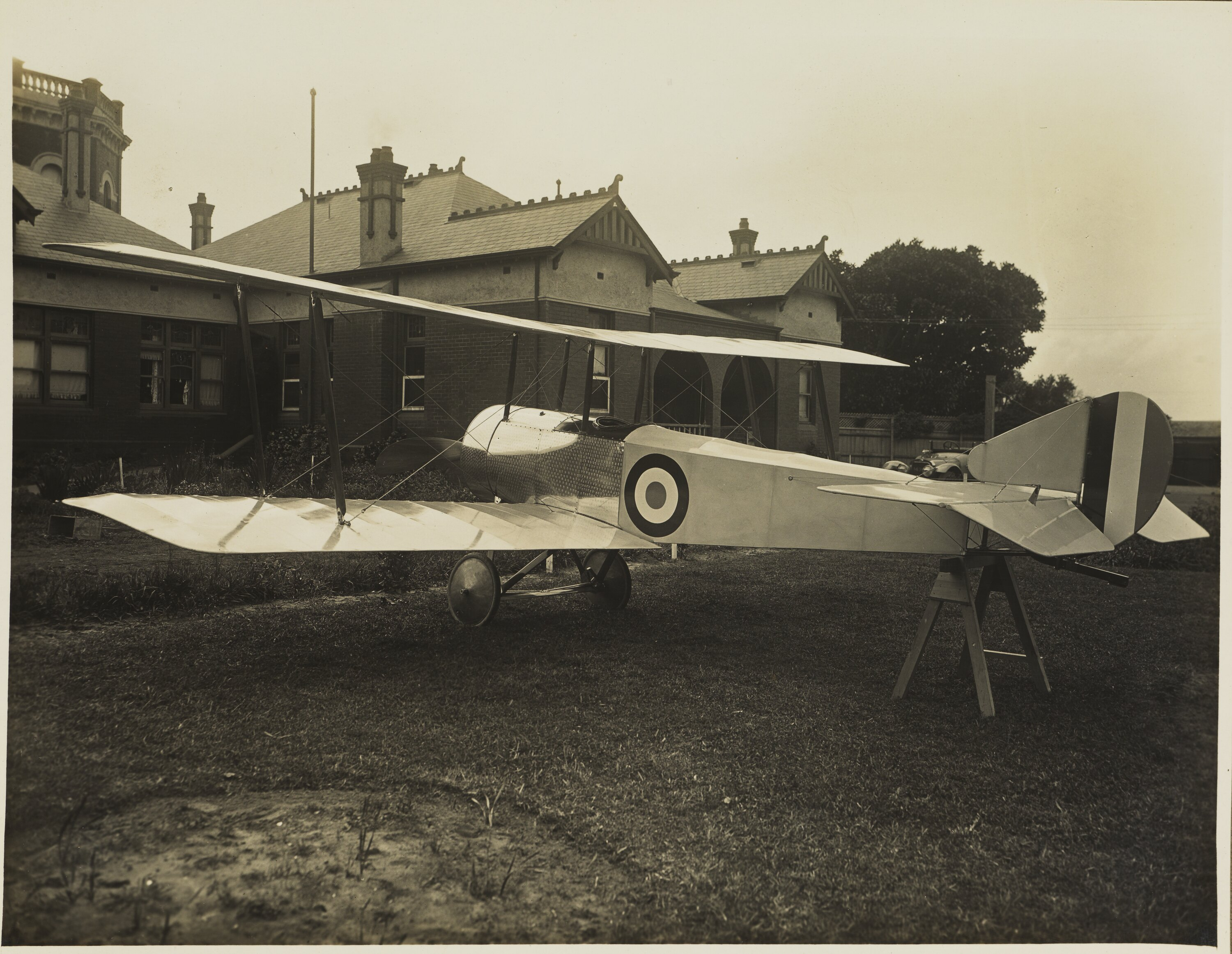
Oblique Rear View of Basil Watson's Biplane, rear lawn, Follacleugh, Elsternwick, 1916.

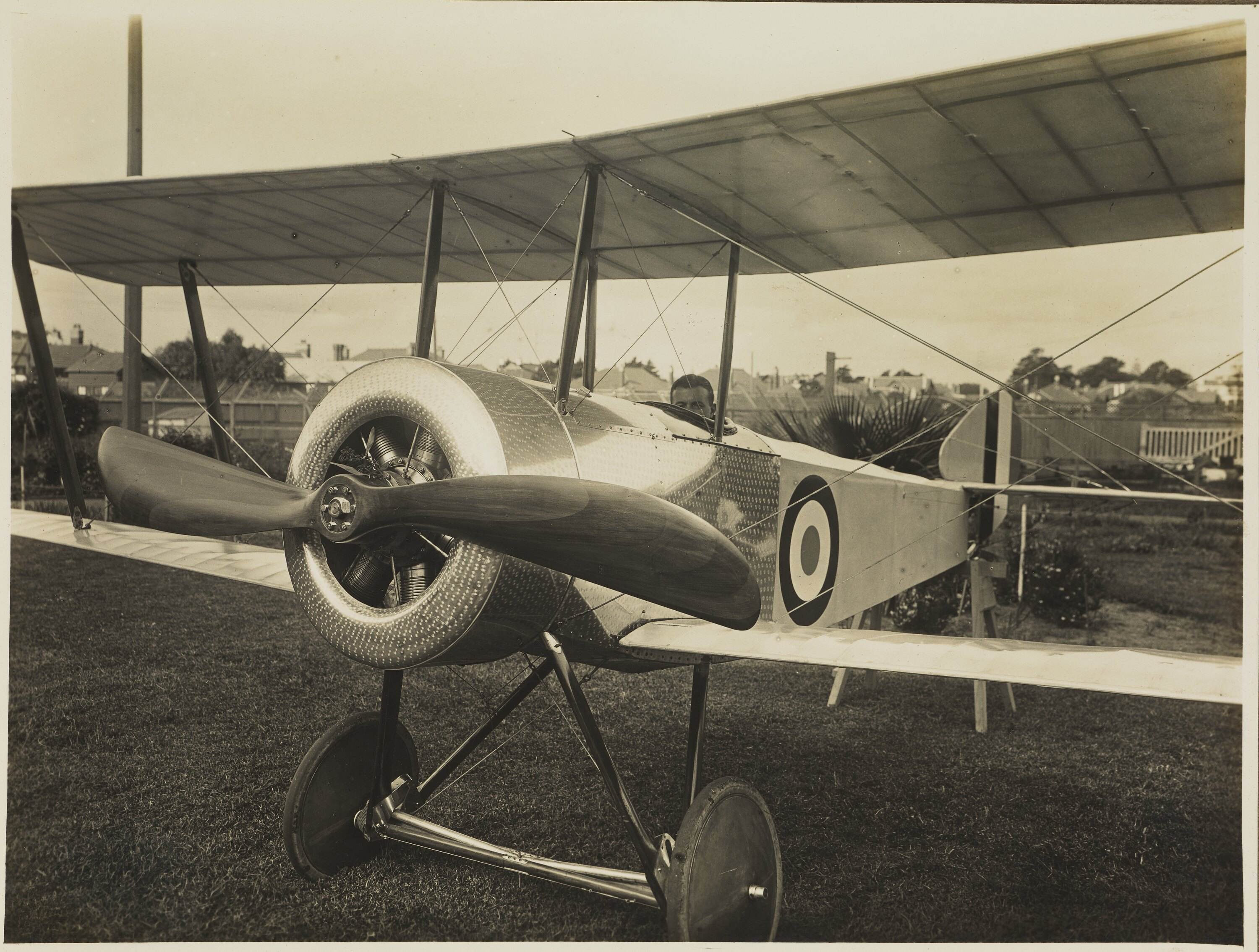
Watson seated in his completed Biplane outside Follacleugh, Elsternwick, 1916.

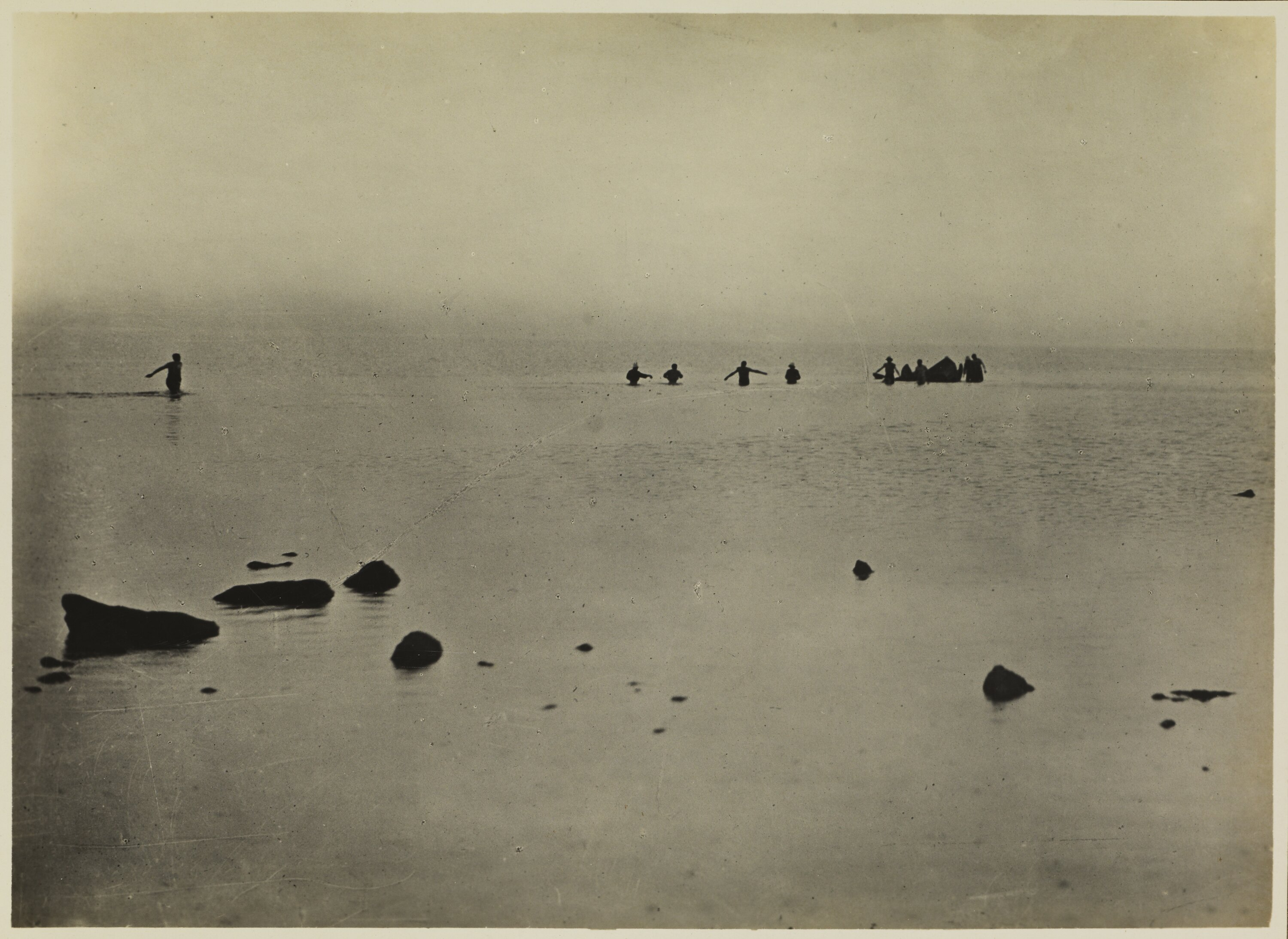
Bathers wading out to the wreckage of Watson's Biplane, off Point Cook, March 1917.

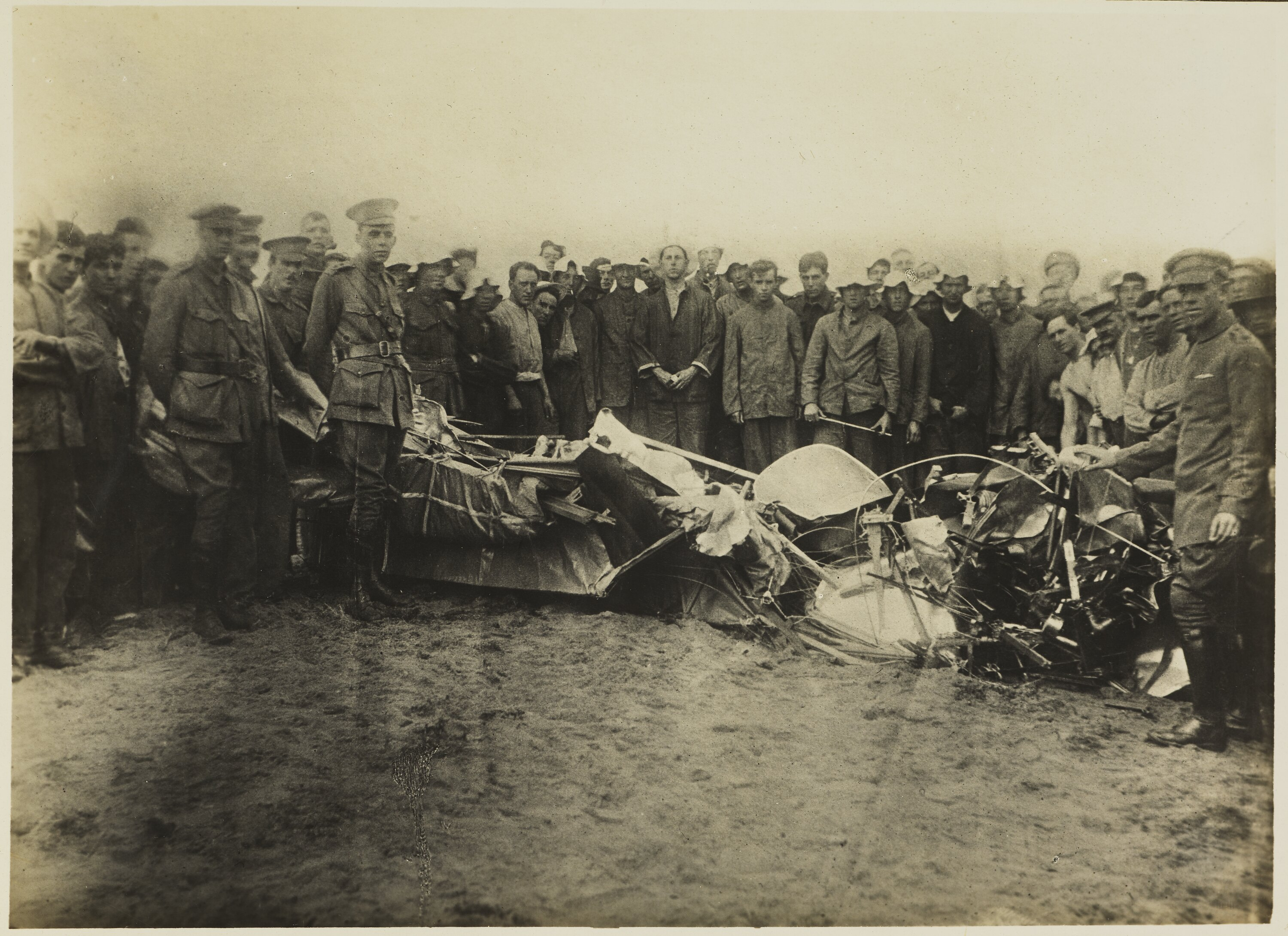
The wreckage from Watson’s Fatal Accident brought ashore, Point Cook, March 1917.

== See also ==
- Harry Houdini: The Aviator — Houdini's flight at Diggers Rest, Friday, 18 March 1910.
