= C. A. Topp =

Educationist and civil servant in Australia (1847–1932)

Charles Alfred Topp BA, LLB, ISO, FLS (22 March 1847 – 13 July 1932) was an education administrator and public servant in colonial Victoria, Australia.

== History ==
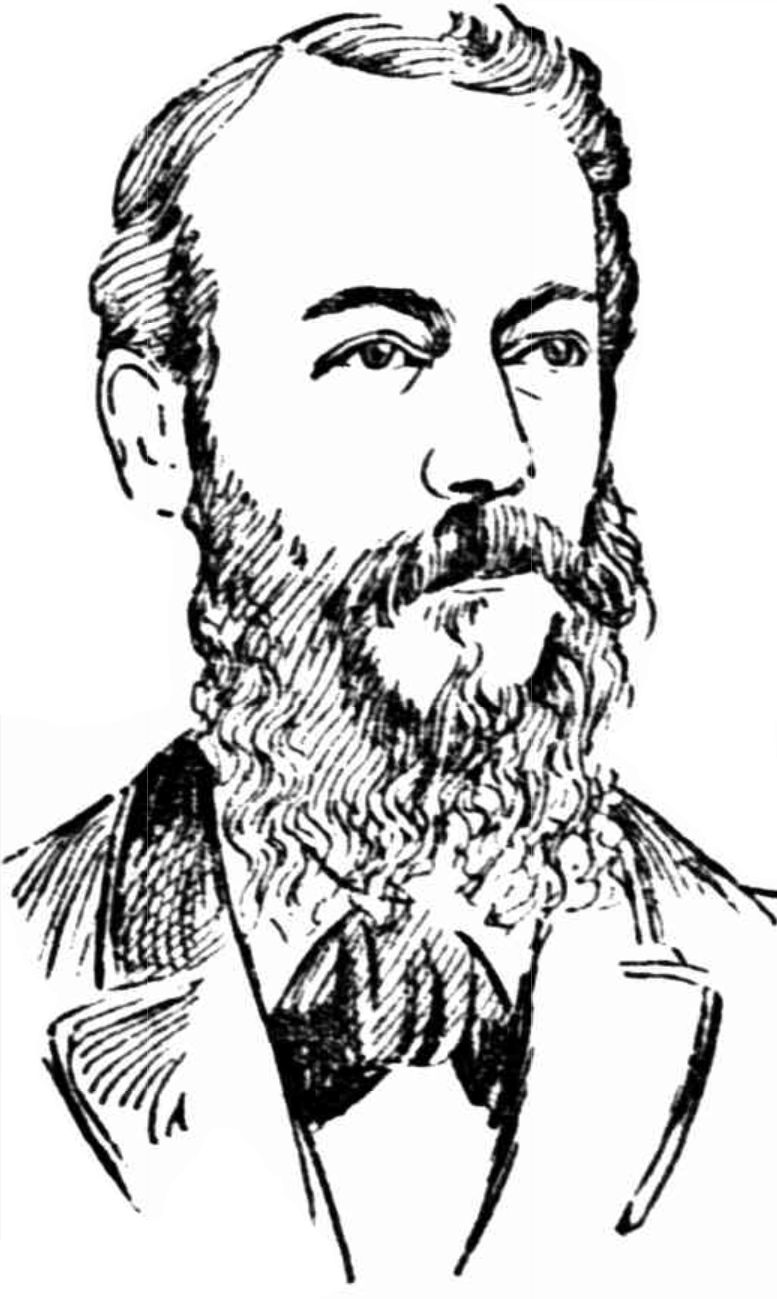
C. A. Topp c. 1894

Topp was born in Huddersfield, Yorkshire, the third son of merchant Samuel Topp (c. 1800 – 23 August 1884) and his wife Sarah Topp, née Clapham, (c. 1819 – 17 September 1890) later of Samuel Topp and Co., 4 Elizabeth Street, Melbourne.

Samuel Topp and his family emigrated to Melbourne by the ship Royal Charter, and young Charles Topp was educated at the Church of England Grammar School and the University of Melbourne, graduating BA in 1867 and LLB in 1869 and was elected to the Bar.

In 1869 he was appointed assistant inspector of schools under G(eorge) Wilson Brown and in 1873 was appointed an inspector for the new department of education. He was appointed senior inspector of schools, then in 1885 succeeded F. J. Gladman as superintendent of the (teacher) Training Institution and principal of the Training College in Spring Street.

In 1888–89 Topp and John Main, senior inspector of Victorian schools, undertook a comparison of Victorian teaching methods with those of New South Wales and South Australia, which report was published in 1889. A recommendation was to grade teachers by ability rather than paper qualifications.

With the overhaul of Victoria's Health laws in 1890, Topp was appointed chairman of the new Board of Public Health, replaced at the Training College by Robert Craig.

He was appointed under-secretary in 1894 and a Public Service Commissioner following the retirement of A. W. Howitt.

He was appointed a Public Service Commissioner following the retirement of A. W. Howitt. G. C. Morrison was his replacement as under-secretary.

== Recognition ==
In 1903 Topp was awarded the Imperial Service Order.

== Other interests ==
Topp was a keen naturalist, joining the Field Naturalists Club of Victoria in 1883, and president in 1889–90. He was elected a Fellow of the Linnean Society in 1887.

In 1886 Topp succeeded Andrew Harper as warden of the senate of Melbourne University, succeeded in 1890 by Thomas P. McInerney.

== Family ==
On 25 July 1877 Topp married Euphemia Shields, youngest daughter of Dr John Shields of Launceston, Tasmania, so becoming a brother-in-law of Robert Ellery and Paul MacGillivray.

He died at his home in East Malvern and his remains buried in the Boroondara Cemetery.
