= John Boyd Watson =

Australian mining magnate

- Born: September 1828; Paisley, Renfrewshire, Scotland
- Died: 4 June 1889; Waverley, New South Wales, Australia
- Resting place: Back Creek cemetery, Sandhurst, Victoria, Australia
- Occupation(s): miner, investor
- Spouse: Mary Ann Covell (1833-1915)
- Children: Margaret Dalton Cooper (1858-1924), George Covell Watson (1857-1868), James Isaac Watson (1865-1944), Jemima Murdoch (1863-1917), John Boyd Watson (1862-1911), Mary Ann Dalton McEacharn (1860-1934)
- Parent(s): James Watson (1802-) and Margaret née Boyd (1804-1870)
- Relatives: Father-in-law of Billy Murdoch, Malcolm McEacharn and Frederick Augustus Cooper

John Boyd Watson (September 1828 – 4 June 1889), was a Scottish-born Australian mining magnate and investor.

== Career ==
He initially worked as a currier at Watson, New South Wales, leaving for Sydney in 1850 and then to the Californian Gold Rush, on his return he went to Sandhurst (now Bendigo) in Victoria where he successfully established a number of mining operations, first at Fifth White Hill, then respectively Paddy's Gully, Old Chum Claim on New Chum Hill. He was a partner in Cornish United Co. and in the late 1860s secured an interest in the adjoining Golden Fleece, Kent and Garden Gully claims. These were later amalgamated under one lease as the Kentish Mine.

He invested in real estate and commercial ventures in Sandhurst and Melbourne. He was one of the founders of the Sydney Daily Telegraph.

== Early life and family ==
Born in Paisley, Renfrewshire, Scotland in 1828, he emigrated to Australia with his parents and siblings on the Orestes arriving in Sydney on 14 March 1841.

Watson married Mary Ann Covell on 6 August 1861 at All Saints Anglican Church, Sandhurst. They had four sons and five daughters. One daughter married Billy Murdoch, another married Malcolm Donald McEacharn. He died on 4 June 1889 in Waverley, New South Wales. He left almost all his fortune of between £1 million and £2 million to his children and grandchildren (one of whom was Basil George Watson), substantial legal proceedings were required to resolve a number of issues. His Victorian assets were valued for probate at £976,549 (equivalent to $155,000,000 in 2022).
