= Springthorpe Memorial =

Memorial in Kew, Victoria, Australia

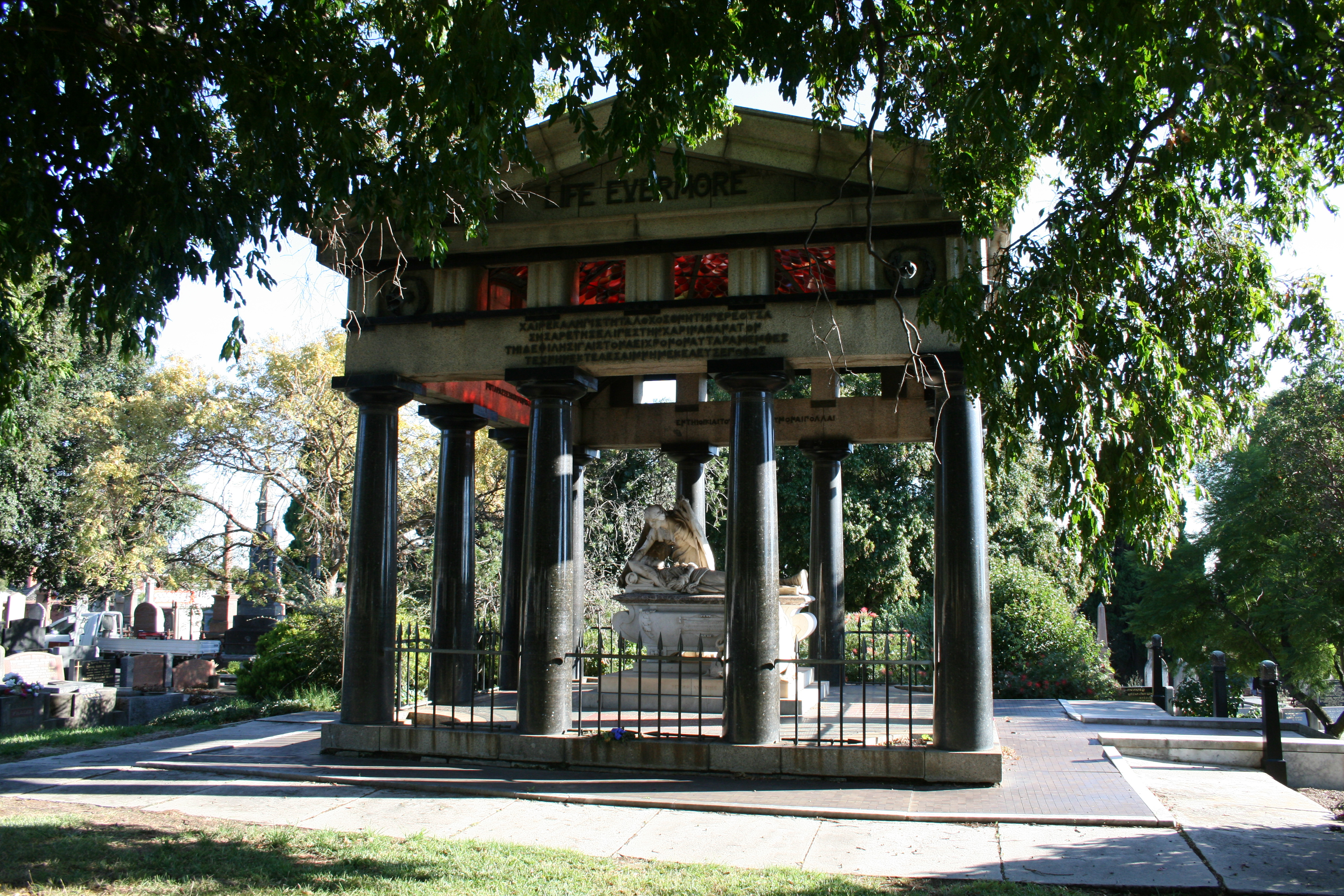
- The memorial, in 2010

- Location of the monument in Greater Metropolitan Melbourne
- Interactive map of Springthorpe Memorial
- Location: Boroondara General Cemetery, Kew, City of Boroondara, Melbourne, Victoria, Australia
- Coordinates: 37°48′12″S 145°2′31″E
- Designer: Harold Desbrowe-Annear
- Type: Victorian era memorial monument
- Material: Marble; granite; bronze; iron; glass; ceramic tiles
- Length: 6 m (20 ft)
- Width: 6 m (20 ft)
- Beginning date: 1897
- Completion date: 1901
- Restored date: 2024
- Dedicated to: Annie Springthorpe
- Commissioned by: Dr John Springthorpe

Site notes
- Area: 33 m^{2} (360 sq ft)
- Sculptor: Bertram Mackennal; Sir John Longstaff; Auguste Fischer (glass); William Guilfoyle (landscape)
- Architectural style: Victorian Academic Classical

Victorian Heritage Register
- Official name: Springthorpe Memorial, Boroondara General Cemetery
- Type: Registered place
- Designated: 7 April 1982
- Part of: Boroondara General Cemetery (VHR H0049)
- Reference no.: VHR H0522
- Heritage overlay no.: HO64
- Categories: Cemeteries and Burial Sites; Monuments and Memorials

The Springthorpe Memorial is an elaborate Victorian era memorial located within Boroondara General Cemetery in Kew, in the City of Boroondara, in the inner eastern suburbs of Melbourne, Victoria, Australia. The memorial was built by Melbourne doctor John Springthorpe, in honour of his wife, Annie Springthorpe (née Inglis), who died in 1897 at the age of 30 while giving birth to their fourth child. Construction began in 1897, and the memorial was unveiled in 1901. The memorial contains twelve columns of deep green granite from Scotland supporting a Harcourt granite superstructure, and a glass dome roof of lead lighting.

The Springthorpe Memorial was added to the Victorian Heritage Register on 7 April 1982 in recognition of its historic and architectural significance.

== Description ==
The centrepiece of the memorial, commissioned a week after her death by the grieving Dr Springthorpe, is a marble sculpture by Bertram Mackennal. A figure of the deceased lies on a sarcophagus while an angel, standing beside her, places a wreath (now missing) by her head. A sorrowful, draped female figure sits beside the sarcophagus, clutching a lyre.

The sculpted figures are housed in a structure derivative of a Greek temple, designed by Melbourne architect Harold Desbrowe-Annear. It has dark marble columns, granite pediments and entablatures adorned with serpent-head gargoyles at each corner, and a stained glass domed roof. The latter is made up of hundreds of ruby-coloured glass pieces supported by radiating ironwork. On a fine day sunlight, streaming through the roof, imparts a reddish glow on the sculpture below.

The memorial is located in a garden setting which the curator of Melbourne's Royal Botanic Gardens, William Guilfoyle, was commissioned to design. However, the layout seen today probably has little in common with his original design.

The base of the memorial, surrounded by an iron picket balustrade, is paved with red tiles which have various verses inscribed on them in gold lettering. There are also inscriptions on each pediment and entablature of the temple structure, in both English and Greek.

There is no mention of the deceased's name on the memorial; the most specific reference being the following inscription:

My own true love
Pattern daughter perfect mother and ideal wife
Born on the 26th day of January 1867
Married on the 26th day of January 1887
Buried on the 26th day of January 1897

By the early 2020s, the statues were stained by pollution-induced soiling and chemical change, the angel's wreath and hand were missing since the 1970s and in 2018 the right wing detached in pieces. Corrosion of the roof's structural framing, broken individual pieces of glass, and increasing leaking at leadwork joints were causing further decay to the statuary, whose fragility was such that simply re-attaching the fallen parts would result in further damage. Consequently, heritage conservationists were engaged and the memorial was restored in 2024.

== Architectural features and influences ==
The Springthorpe Memorial is completed in the Victorian Academic Classical style, influenced by Greek Revival and some key Gothic features. Additionally, it employs an Ionian order, with a distinct emphasis on symmetry and proportion. Such classical attributes are juxtaposed with the more Gothic-derived elements of the stained glass dome and the square plan.

Inspired by John Ruskin, Springthorpe strove to create a structure that was authentic and permanent. This is reflected in the choice of materials including, marble from Carrara, green granite from Labrador, bronze, cast iron cased in copper, mosaic tiles, and glass. All aspects of the memorial, including the sculpture, structure, and ornament were imbued with meaning which combined with the large range of materials gives it a broad level of engagement.

The memorial is conceptualised around a strong belief in Christianity in combination with a dramatisation and idealisation of love. Motivated by the desire to be reunited with his wife, Dr Springthorpe found comfort in a dual commitment to the Protestant church and to building a structure that would capture the complexity of his intense grief. Such devotion created a need to manifest something more solid and more sustaining than traditional forms of memorialising; of conceiving a whole [that] is more than a Tomb [but]…is the Real made Ideal – an apotheosis of love for all true lovers to the end of Time with its tale of loss, memory, separation and Reunion.

To this end, Springthorpe wanted a representation that was creative, energetic, elaborate and universal. Such energy is captured in his enthusiastic use of text. The memorial is laden with inscriptions of chosen poets such as Walt Whitman, Dante, Dante Gabriel Rossetti, and Robert Browning, as well as Springthorpe's personal thoughts. Fascinated by concepts of the ideal woman, Springthorpe had delivered a paper, several years earlier, entitled The Perfect Woman, in which he concluded that Shakespeare's Rosalind was the ideal. Annie seems to be likened to this ideal in the inscription "Pattern Daughter, Perfect Mother, and Ideal Wife".

== Symbolic references of the memorial ==
The Springthorpe memorial is laden with wide range of sculptural and textual symbolism and includes adaptations of the Bible, the Greek classics, Whitman, William Wordsworth, Dante, Browning, Riley, and Rossetti. Springthorpe wanted the structure to stand not just as a memorial for his wife, but also as an expression of the hope in loss for all mankind, and thus the name of his deceased wife was not inscribed anywhere on the memorial.

Circling the memorial from the eastern side, looking up at the four gables, the inscriptions read, "Peace Evermore", "Life Evermore", "Light Evermore" and "Love Evermore", which were borrowed from a hymn in Dr. Charles Strong's collection for the Australian church.

In the original sketches by Desbrowe-Annear, one metope at the end of the memorial's frieze was to be filled with a classically-inspired laurel wreath. However, the completed scheme instead used sculptural bronze snake heads, designed by prominent Melbourne artist and close friend to Springthorpe, Sir John Longstaff. Snake heads were included for their strong association with death, the underworld and also with resurrection. Springthorpe, a devout Protestant doctor also saw the snake as a symbol of his profession and also, as a symbol of Woman.

Springthorpe, an avid follower of the English painter and poet Rossetti, referred several times throughout his diary to Rossetti's Blessed Damozel. Two stanzas from this poem are inscribed in north elevation of the memorial:

The blessed damozel leaned out From the gold bar of Heaven;
Her eyes were deeper than the depth Of waters stilled at even;
She had three lilies in her hand,
And the stars in her hair were seven.

It is worth noting too, that Springthorpe's late wife was depicted in sculpture holding a bouquet of three lilies with a crown of seven stars (the wreath was subsequently removed). Included in the sculptural group sits a weeping woman at his late wife's feet, eternalising human grief and sorrow, and on her other side stands the figure of an angel, a representation of god, death and immortality, who places the wreath on Annie's head.

== Gallery ==
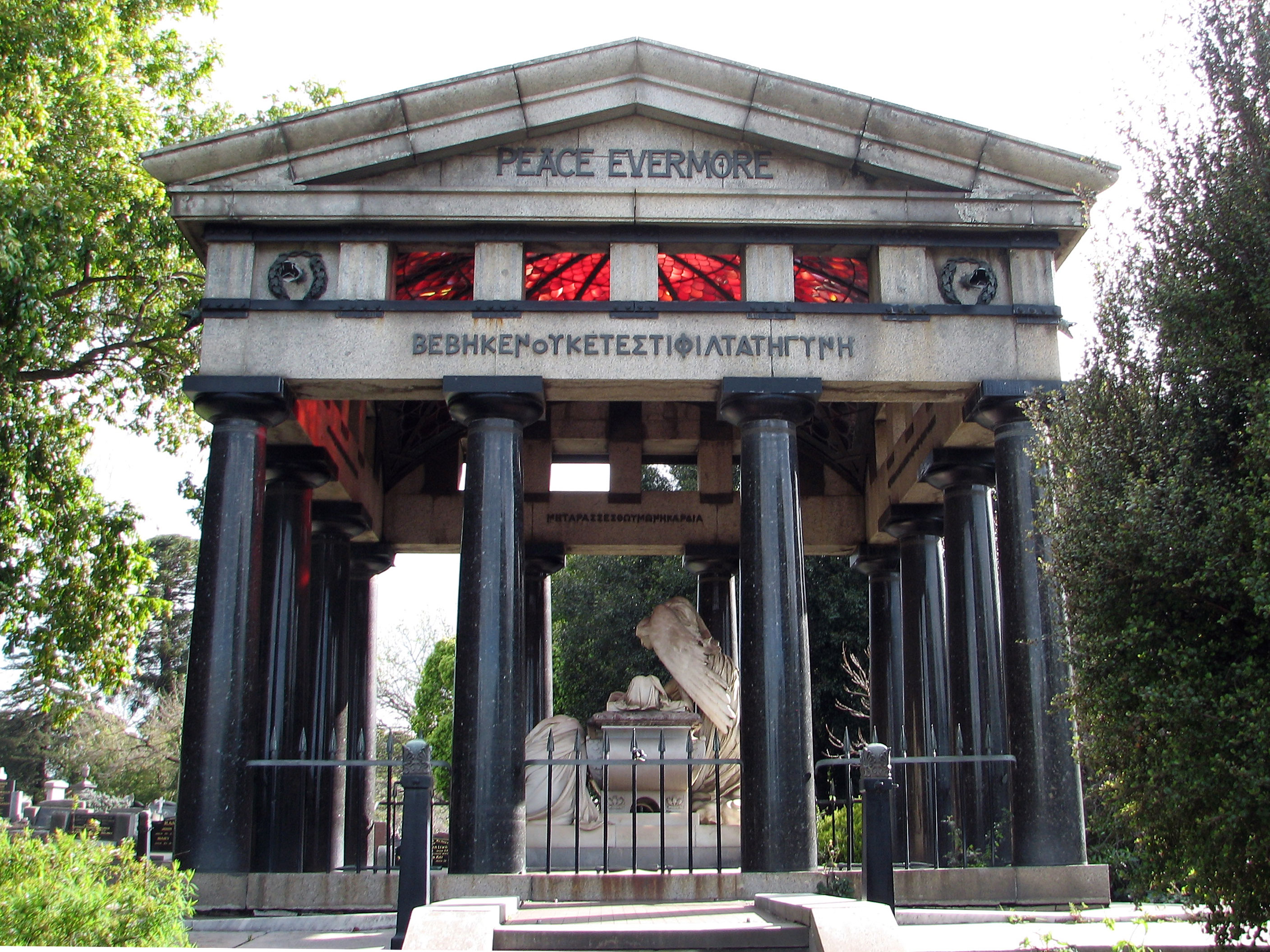
Exterior

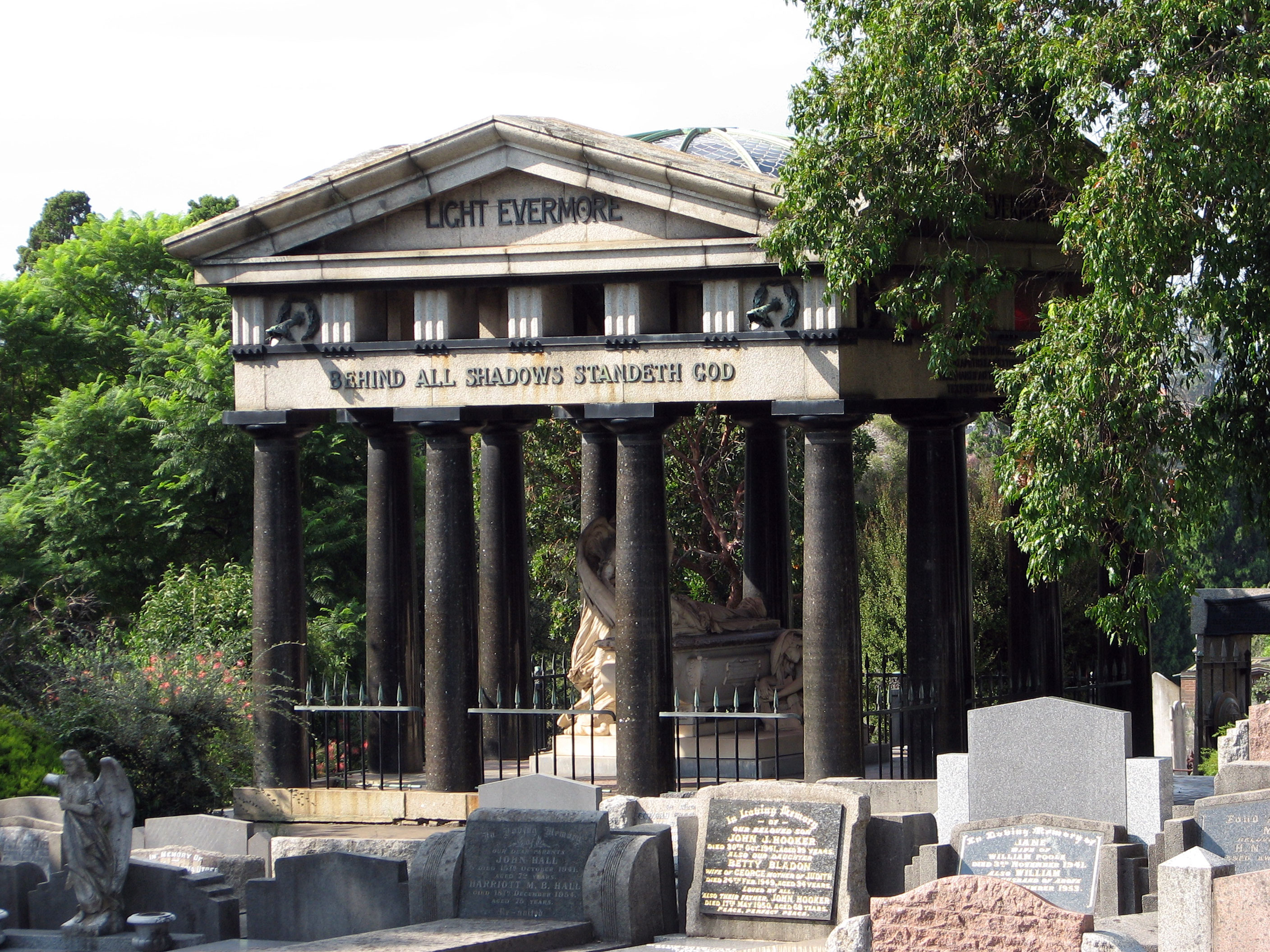
Western side

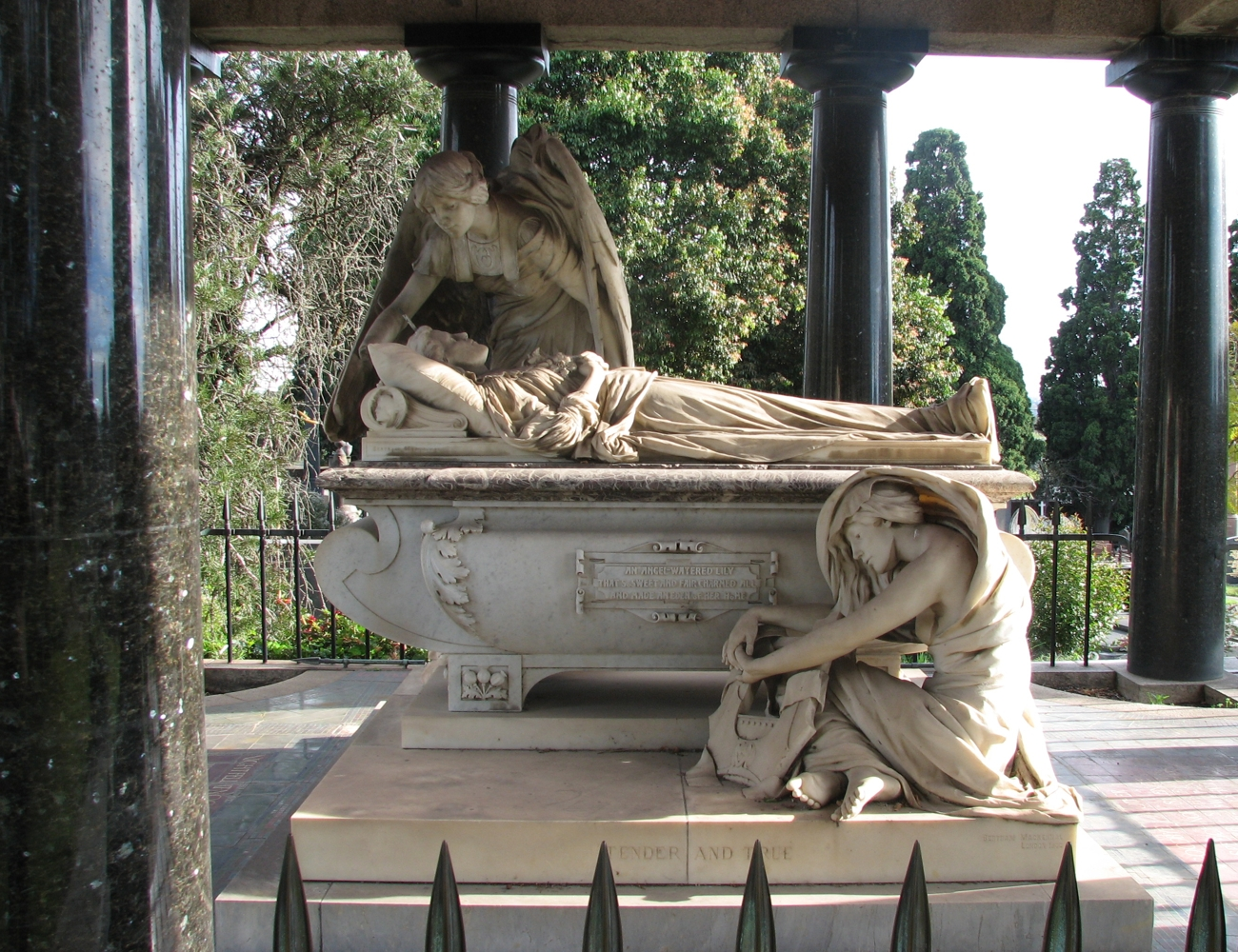
Sculpture Group

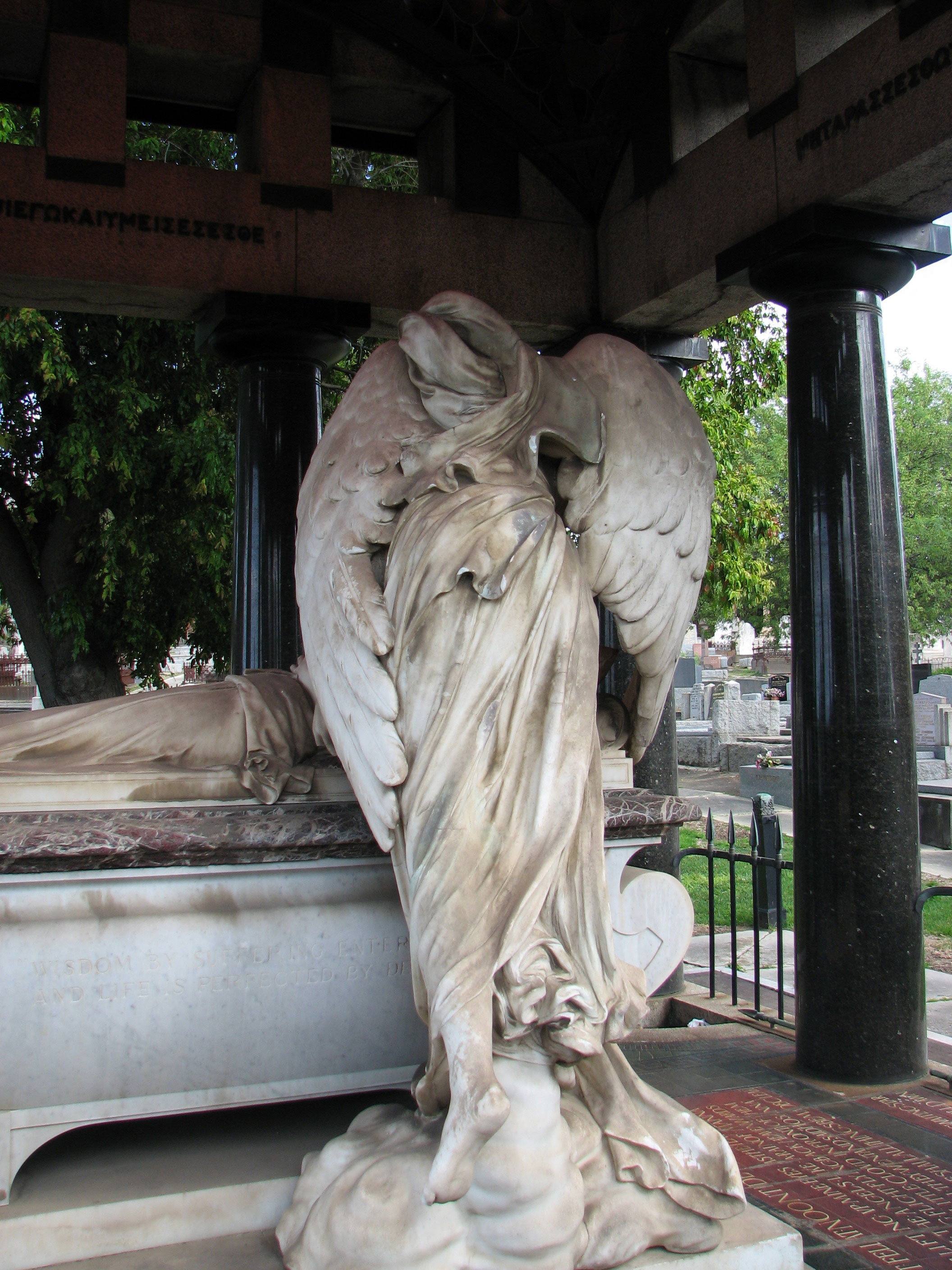
Rear view of angel

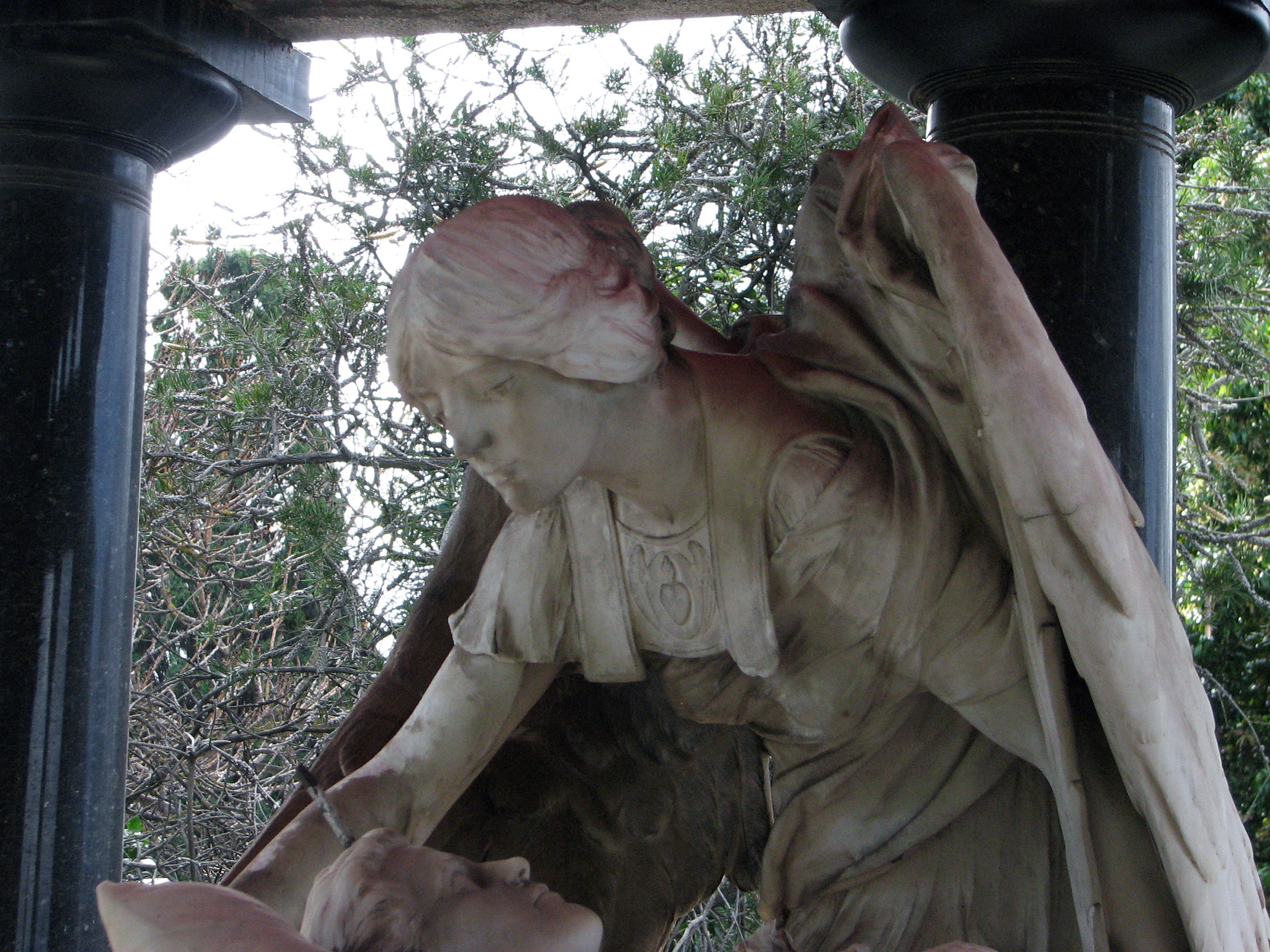
Detail of angel

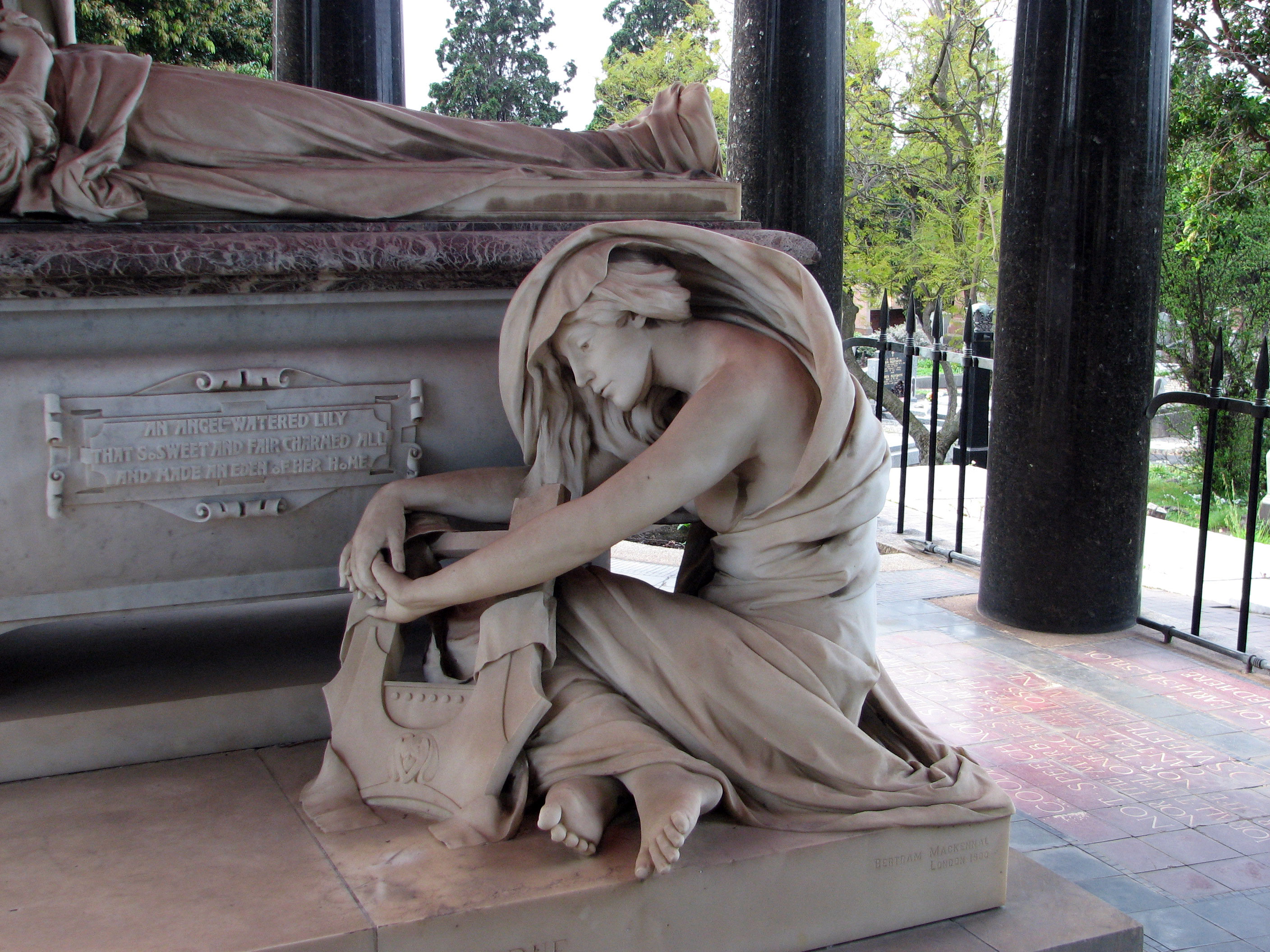
Mourning figure

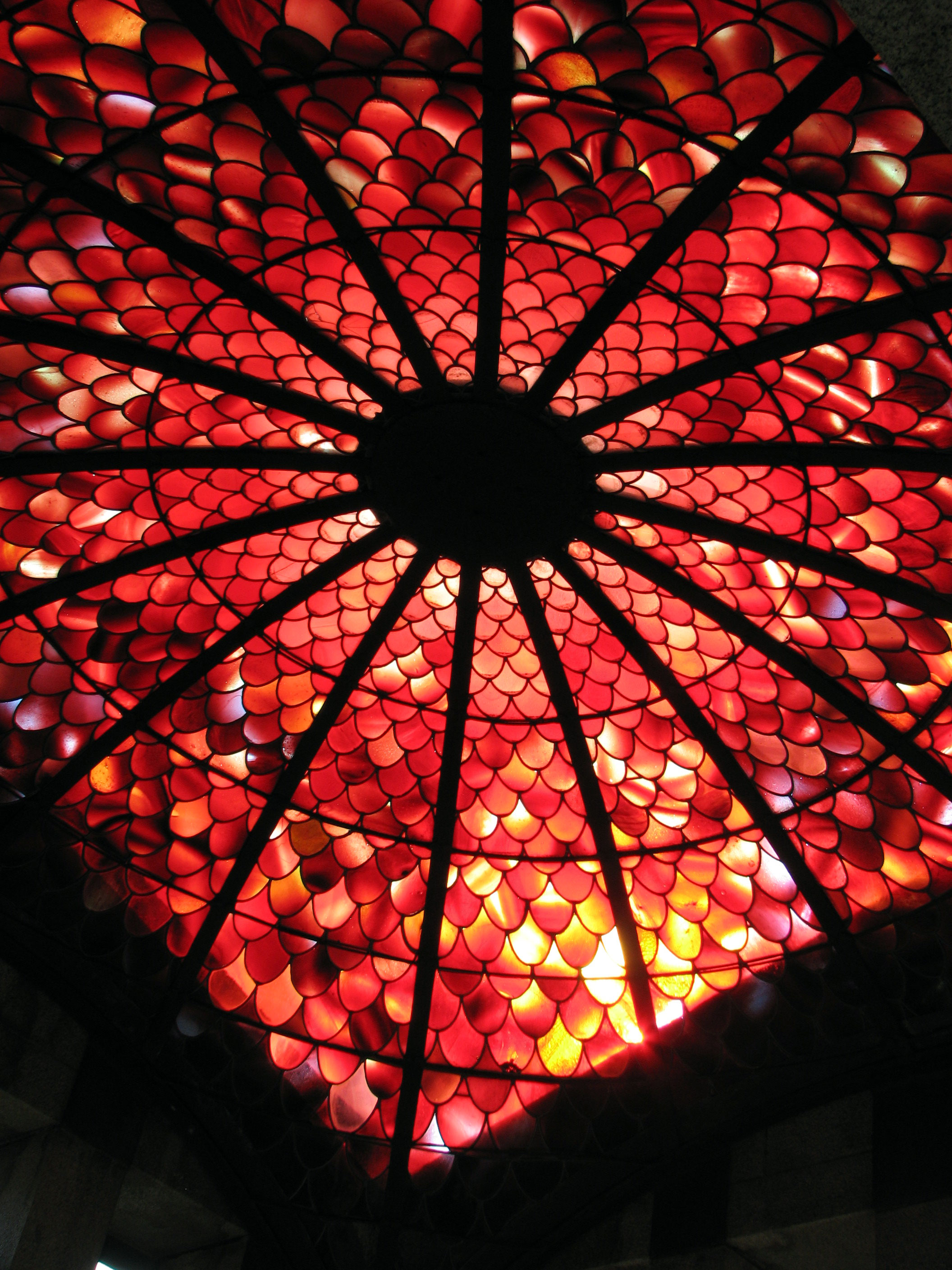
Glass tile roof

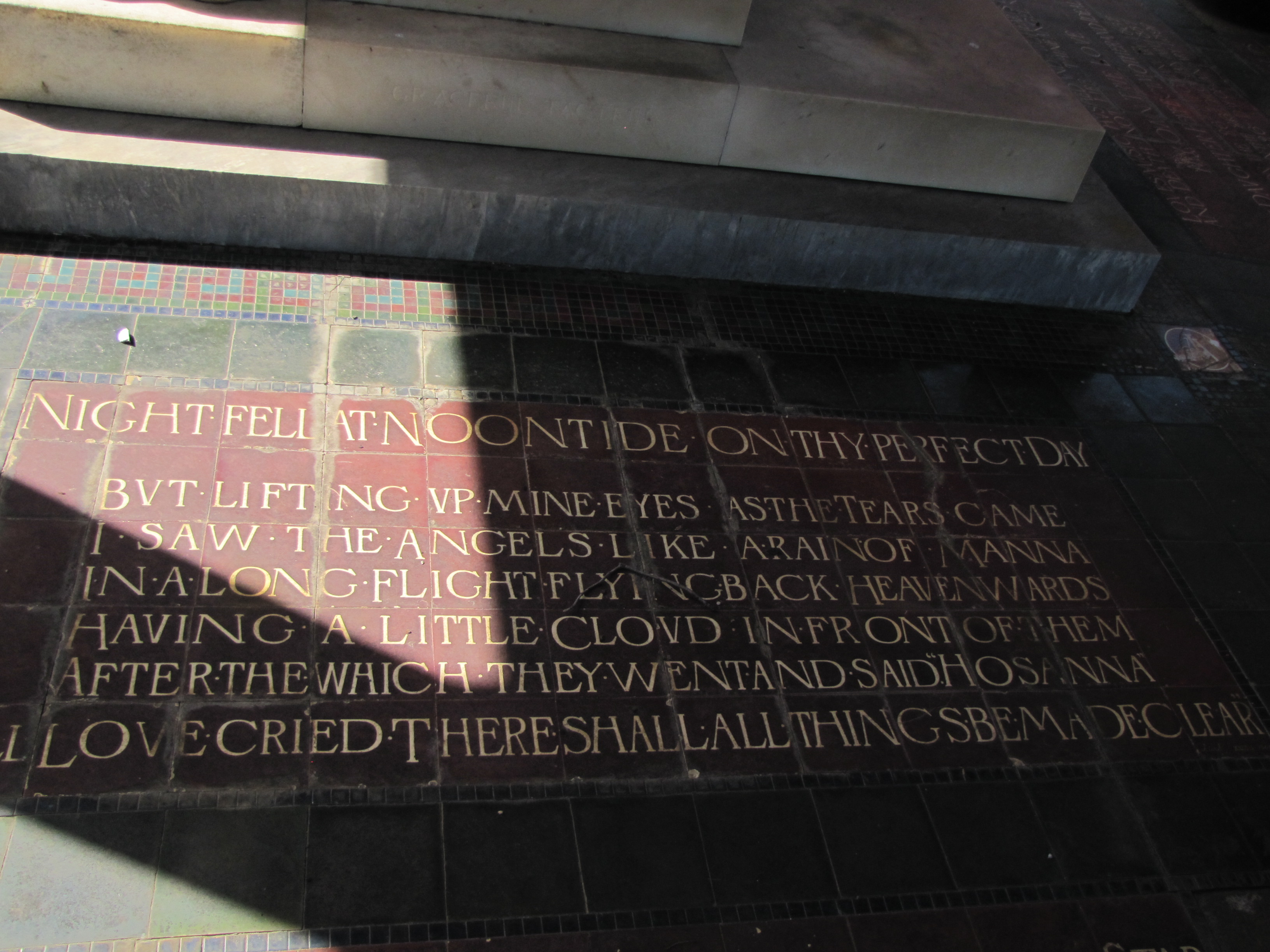
Inscription example

== See also ==
- Architecture of Melbourne
- List of monuments and memorials in Victoria
- List of places on the Victorian Heritage Register in the City of Boroondara
