= John Springthorpe =

Australian physician (1855-1933)

John William Springthorpe
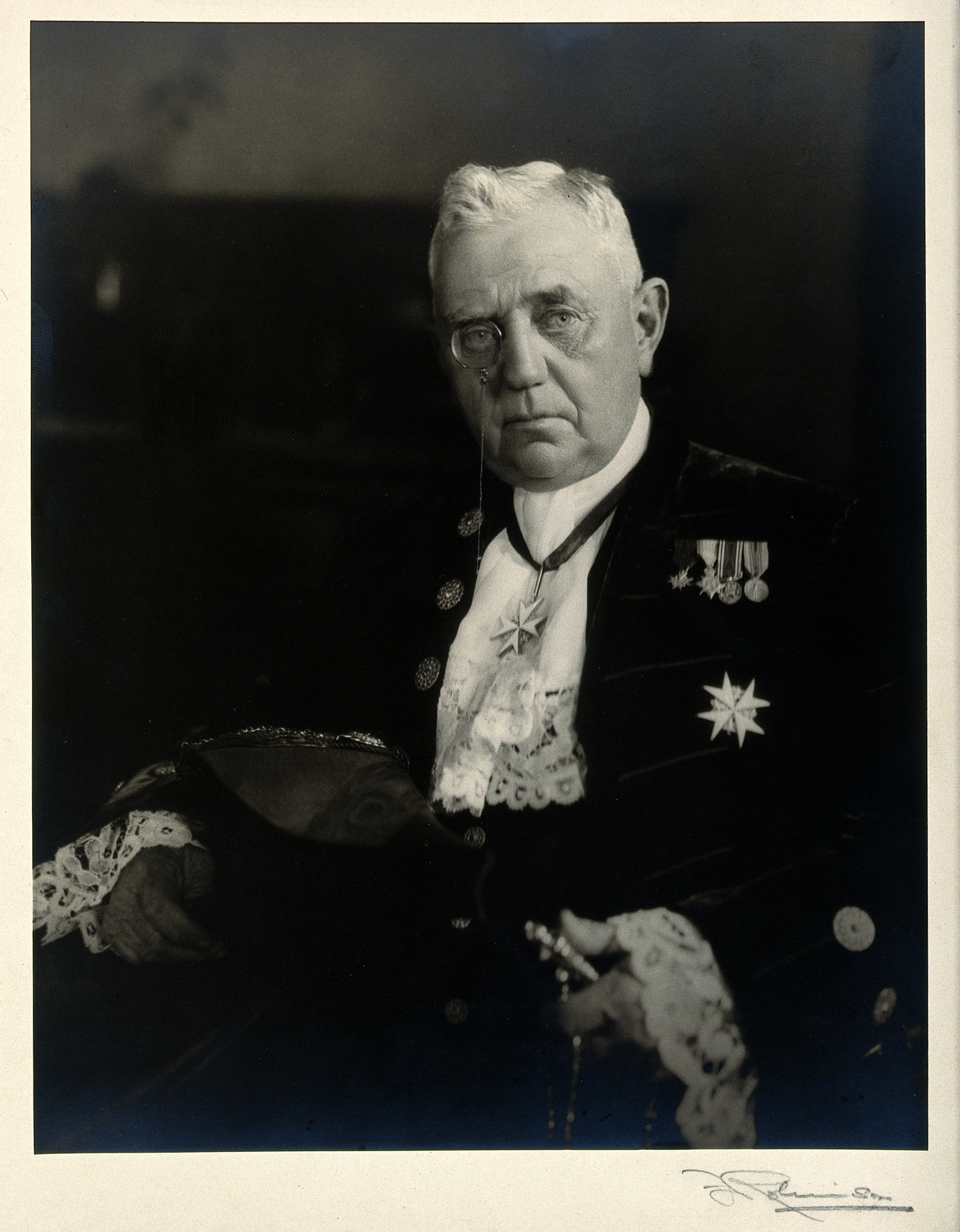
- Portrait. Credit: Wellcome Institute
- Born: 29 August 1855; Wolverhampton, Staffordshire, England
- Died: 22 April 1933 (aged 77); Richmond, Victoria, Australia
- Occupation: Physician
- Spouses: Annie Constance Marie Inglis (m. 1887–1897); Daisie Evelyn Johnstone (m. 1916)
- Parents: John Springthorpe; Hannah, née Newell

John William Springthorpe (1855–1933) was an Australian physician. He was the first Australian graduate to become a member of the Royal College of Physicians of London.

Springthorpe came to Sydney in the Colony of New South Wales when a young child. He started his schooling then and completed it in Melbourne in the Colony of Victoria. He also completed undergraduate and medical degrees at the University of Melbourne. He then did advanced study in the United Kingdom before returning to work in the Colony of Victoria as a medical doctor.

The Springthorpe Memorial at Boroondara General Cemetery was constructed in memory of his wife Annie, who died during childbirth in 1897.
