= Leo Cussen =

Australian jurist (1859-1933)

Sir Leo Cussen
- Born: Leo Finn Bernard Cussen; 29 November 1859; Portland, Victoria, Australia
- Died: 17 May 1933 (aged 73); Auburn, Melbourne, Victoria
- Burial place: Cussen Memorial, Boroondara General Cemetery, Kew, City of Boroondara, Melbourne
- Education: Hamilton College; University of Melbourne
- Occupations: Jurist; barrister; academic
- Years active: 1886–1933
- Known for: Justice of the Supreme Court of Victoria
- Notable work: Consolidation of Imperial Legislation
- Board member of: Melbourne Cricket Club; State Library of Victoria; Victorian Museum; National Gallery of Victoria
- Spouse: Johanna Bevan (m. 1890)
- Children: 6 sons; 1 daughter

Sir Leo Finn Bernard Cussen (29 November 1859 – 17 May 1933) was an Australian jurist who served as a Justice of the Supreme Court of Victoria from 1906 until 1932. Cussen died suddenly at his home in Auburn, Melbourne, aged 73 years.

== Early life and education ==
Cussen was born in Portland on the western coast of Victoria in 1859. He was educated at Hamilton College in Hamilton. He studied civil engineering at the University of Melbourne, graduating with a Certificate of Civil Engineering in 1879. He was a talented sportsman, and represented the University in both cricket and Australian rules football. After graduating, he took a job with the Government of Victoria's Department of Railways, where he worked on the railway between Melbourne and Ballarat.

Cussen returned to the University of Melbourne to study arts and law, graduating with a Bachelor of Arts in 1884, and a Master of Arts and Bachelor of Laws degrees in 1886.

== Career ==
Cussen was admitted to the Victorian Bar to practice as a barrister in September of that year. He continued to play cricket, and was a member of the Victorian Bar XI. In 1890, he was appointed as a lecturer in law at the University of Melbourne. Also in that year, he married Johanna Bevan, with whom he would have six sons and a daughter.

On 19 March 1906, Cussen was appointed a Judge of the Supreme Court of Victoria. He was widely regarded as an excellent judge. Sir Owen Dixon, himself regarded as Australia's foremost judge, once described Cussen as "the greatest of all judges." In 1921, he was knighted for his services as a Judge in the Supreme Court of Victoria.

Cussen conducted two consolidations of all the Acts of the Parliament of Victoria, the first in 1915 and the second in 1928. Consolidation involves compiling all amendments of a particular act into one document. In 1922, Cussen drafted the bill for the Imperial Acts Application Act 1922, which set out which laws of the Parliament of the United Kingdom were in force in Victoria. The Act, along with the 1928 version of the consolidated acts, set out every piece of legislation in force in the state at the time in a central location. Cussen was knighted in 1922 in recognition of this effort, in addition to his work as a judge. He continued to sit on the bench in 1924 and again later in 1931–1932, served as Acting Chief Justice of Victoria.

Aside from his legal work, Cussen was involved in the public life of Victoria. Cussen was elected president of the Melbourne Cricket Club in 1907, a position he would hold until his death; and served as the longest-serving president of the club. In 1916, Cussen was appointed a trustee of the State Library of Victoria, the Victorian Museum, and the National Gallery of Victoria, including serving as president of the trustees from 1928.

== Legacy ==
The Leo Cussen Institute, which provides legal education, was established in 1972 by the Parliament of Victoria and named in Cussen's honour. The Graduates' Association of the Institute conducts the Leo Cussen Memorial Lecture, first held in 1986 and held in most years since.

One of his sons died aged 14 years in 1911. Cussen erected the Cussen Memorial in his honour, located in the Roman Catholic section of the Kew Cemetery. Cussen was interred in the mausoleum in 1933, and various other members of the Cussen family have subsequently been interred in the memorial.
