= Boroondara General Cemetery =

Cemetery in Melbourne, Victoria, Australia

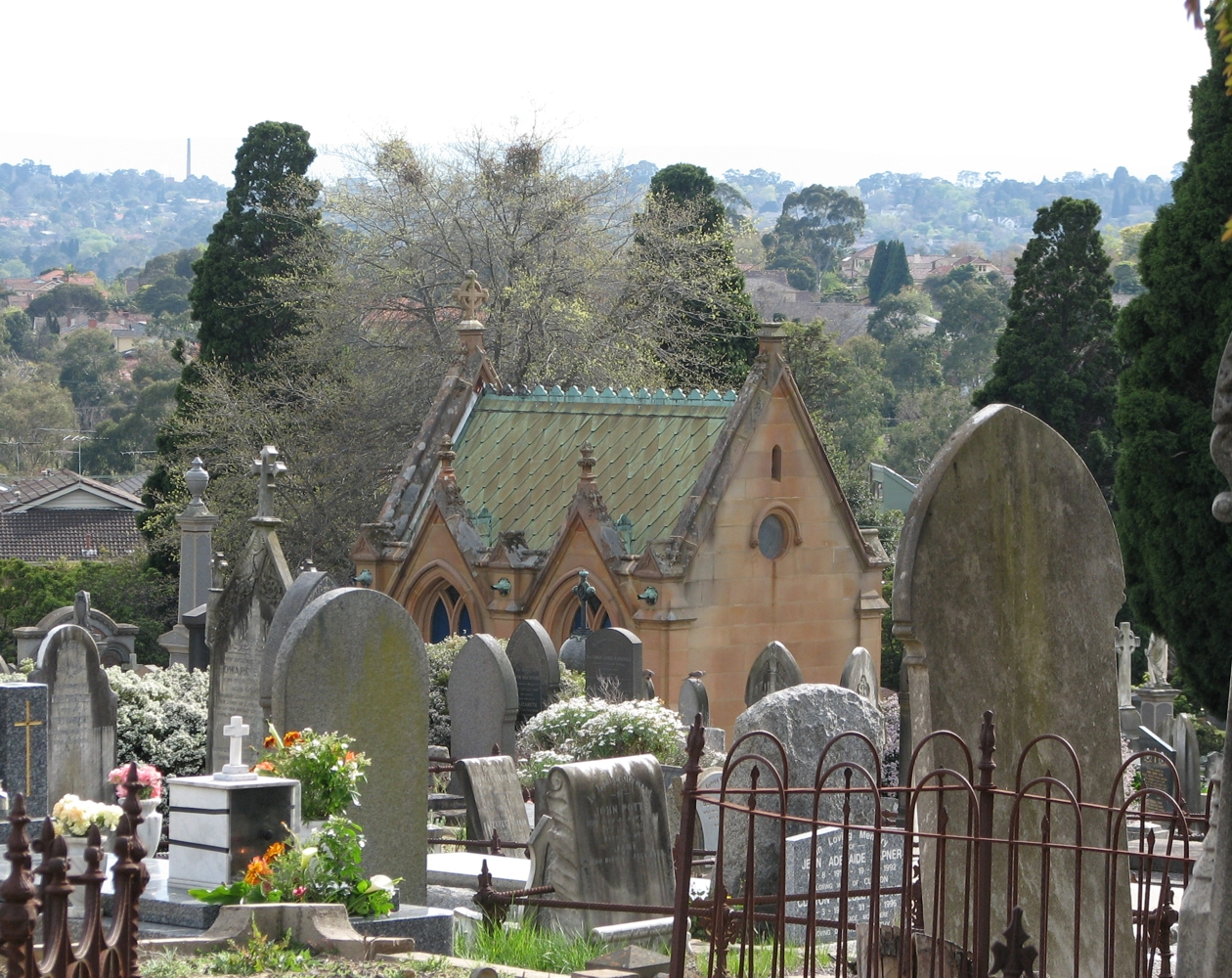
- General view with the Cussen Memorial in the middle ground

- Location of the cemetery in Melbourne
- Interactive map of Boroondara General Cemetery

Details
- Established: 1859; 167 years ago
- Location: Kew, Victoria
- Country: Australia
- Coordinates: 37°48′12″S 145°02′38″E
- Type: Public
- Size: 13 ha (31 acres)
- No. of graves: 75,000
- Website: kewcemetery.com.au
- Footnotes: Key Cemetery Search; Boroondara General Cemetery – Billion Graves; Boroondara General Cemetery CWGC

Victorian Heritage Register
- Official name: Boroondara General Cemetery
- Type: Registered place; Registered object integral to a registered place
- Designated: 8 December 2005
- Reference no.: VHR H0049
- Heritage overlay no.: HO064
- Category: Cemeteries and Burial Sites

The Boroondara General Cemetery, often referred to as Kew cemetery, is one of the oldest cemeteries in Victoria, Australia, created in the tradition of the Victorian garden cemetery. The cemetery, located in Kew, an inner eastern suburb of Melbourne, was added to the Victorian Heritage Register on 8 December 2005 in recognition of its aesthetic, architectural, scientific (botanical), and historical significance.

== History ==
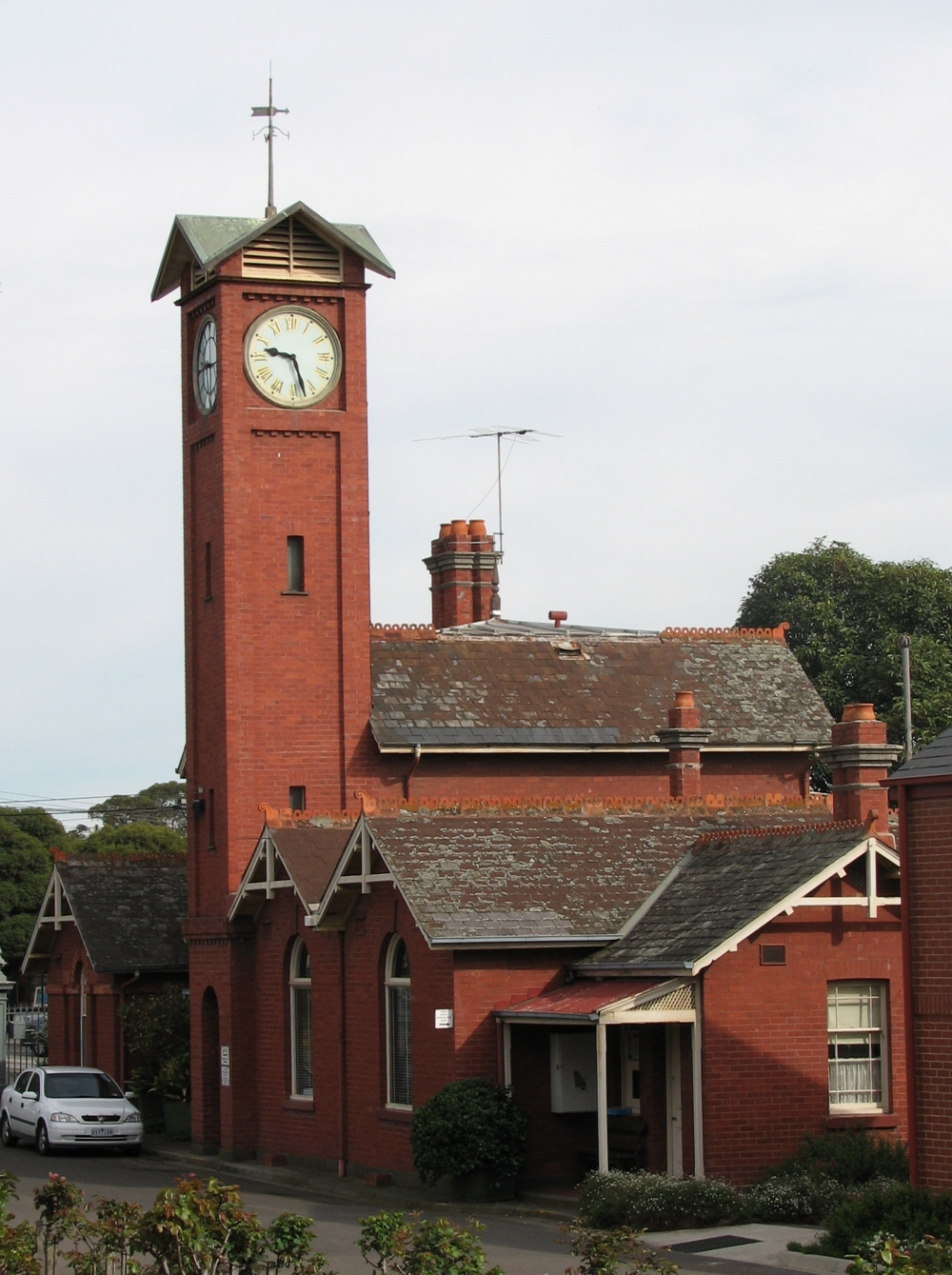
The cemetery office and clocktower

The 13-hectare (31-acre) cemetery site was reserved in 1855 and trustees were first appointed in 1858. A site plan was drawn up by Frederick Acheson, a civil engineer in the Public Lands Office, with the layout segregated by religious denomination, a common occurrence at the time. The first burial took place in 1859.

In 1864 Albert Purchas, who was architect and surveyor for the Melbourne General Cemetery, joined the trust. Purchas is believed to be the designer of the landscape layout as well as many of the features of the cemetery including the cast iron entrance gates (1889), the rotunda (1890) and the surrounding ornamental brick wall (1895–96), as well as various additions to the original 1860 Cottage in the period 1866–1899 including the clock tower. The design of the cemetery was influenced by the Victorian garden cemetery movement. This influence was reflected in the curving path network following the contours of the site, the creation of defined views and a park like setting.

In the latter half of the twentieth century the cemetery was becoming full and many pathways and grassed verges were used to provide new burial sites. At the same time, many of the older Victorian monuments began to fall into disrepair due to their age and lack of funding to maintain them. However, since about 2010, with the assistance of enthusiastic volunteers from the Friends of Boroondara (Kew) Cemetery, the cemetery is undergoing a horticultural renaissance, returning to its early glory as a garden cemetery.

In 2001 the Peace Haven Mausoleum was built by the Cemetery Trust to cater for growing demand for above-ground burials and interments, and in 2011 garden crypts were opened in a bushland setting near the High Street pedestrian gate. The cemetery is still an operating cemetery, offering a range of burial and interment options.

== Burials and memorials ==
The cemetery has had more than 80,000 burials since 1859. Among these are some very prominent Melburnians. The Syme memorial was constructed in 1908 in memory of David Syme, publisher of The Age newspaper. It has a temple-like appearance and Egyptian motifs.

Between 1889 and 1907, the Springthorpe Memorial was constructed on behalf of Dr John Springthorpe in memory of his wife, Annie; and in 1912 the Cussen Memorial was commissioned by Sir Leo Cussen, a justice of the Supreme Court of Victoria as a memorial to his 14-year-old son, Hubert. The latter is a small mausoleum chapel designed in the Federation Gothic Revival style. Both the Springthorpe and Cussen Memorials were separately added to the Victorian Heritage Register.

== Notable interments ==
- John Arthur Andrews (1865–1903), anarchist, journalist, poet, linguist
- George Henry Bennett (1850–1908), brewer, benefactor, politician, Mayor of Richmond, president of Richmond Football Club
- Graham Berry (1822–1904), Premier of Victoria
- Joseph Bosisto (1827–1898), chemist, politician, eucalyptus manufacturer and advocate
- Louis Buvelot (1814–1888), artist
- Edward William Cole (1832–1918), "Cole of the Book Arcade", bookseller and children's book publisher
- Amalie Colquhoun (1894–1974), artist
- Madge Connor (1874–1952), pioneering police officer, private investigator
- Evelyn Conyers (1870–1944), Australian army nursing matron
- Leo Cussen (1859–1933), jurist
- William Davidson (1844–1920), engineer, pioneer of Melbourne's water supply
- Owen Dixon (1886–1972), Chief Justice
- Edmund Duggan (1862–1938), actor & playwright
- Frank Gavan Duffy (1852–1936), Chief Justice
- Edward Dunn (1844–1937), geologist
- Thomas James Everist (1807-1879), Melbourne's first building surveyor
- William Fitchett (1841–1928), journalist, educator
- Major General John Forsyth (1867–1928), soldier
- Thomas Sergeant Hall (1858–1915), scientist
- Lesbia Harford (1891–1927), poet
- H. C. A. Harrison (1836–1929), sports administrator, pioneer of Australian Rules Football
- Helen Hart (1839–1908), Suffragist, lecturer, poet, evangelist
- Edythe Ellison Harvie (1902–1984), architect
- Jessie Isabel Henderson (1866–1951), social welfare worker
- Edward Henty (1812–1878), pioneer
- Major General Godfrey Irving (1867–1937), soldier
- Jules François de Sales Joubert (1824–1907), impresario, prospector
- Ian MacFarlan (1881–1964), Premier of Victoria
- Marion Macfarlane (1840–1898), Anglican deaconess and Roman Catholic nun
- John Simpson Mackennal (1832–1901), sculptor & architect
- Mona McBurney (1862–1932), composer
- Georgiana McCrae (1804–1890), pioneer, artist, diarist
- William Murray McPherson (1865–1932), Premier of Victoria
- Anthony Michell (1870–1959), engineer
- John Michell (1863–1940), mathematician
- Francis Murphy (1809–1891), politician, first Speaker of the Victorian Legislative Assembly
- Charles Nuttall (1872–1934), artist, writer
- William Orr (1843–1929), mining magnate and politician
- John Gibson Paton (1824–1907), Presbyterian missionary to Vanuatu
- Carl Pinschof (1855–1926), merchant, consul, arts patron
- Albert Purchas (1825–1909), architect, surveyor
- Joseph Reed (1823–1890), architect
- Mary Rogers (1872–1932), first woman elected to local government in Victoria
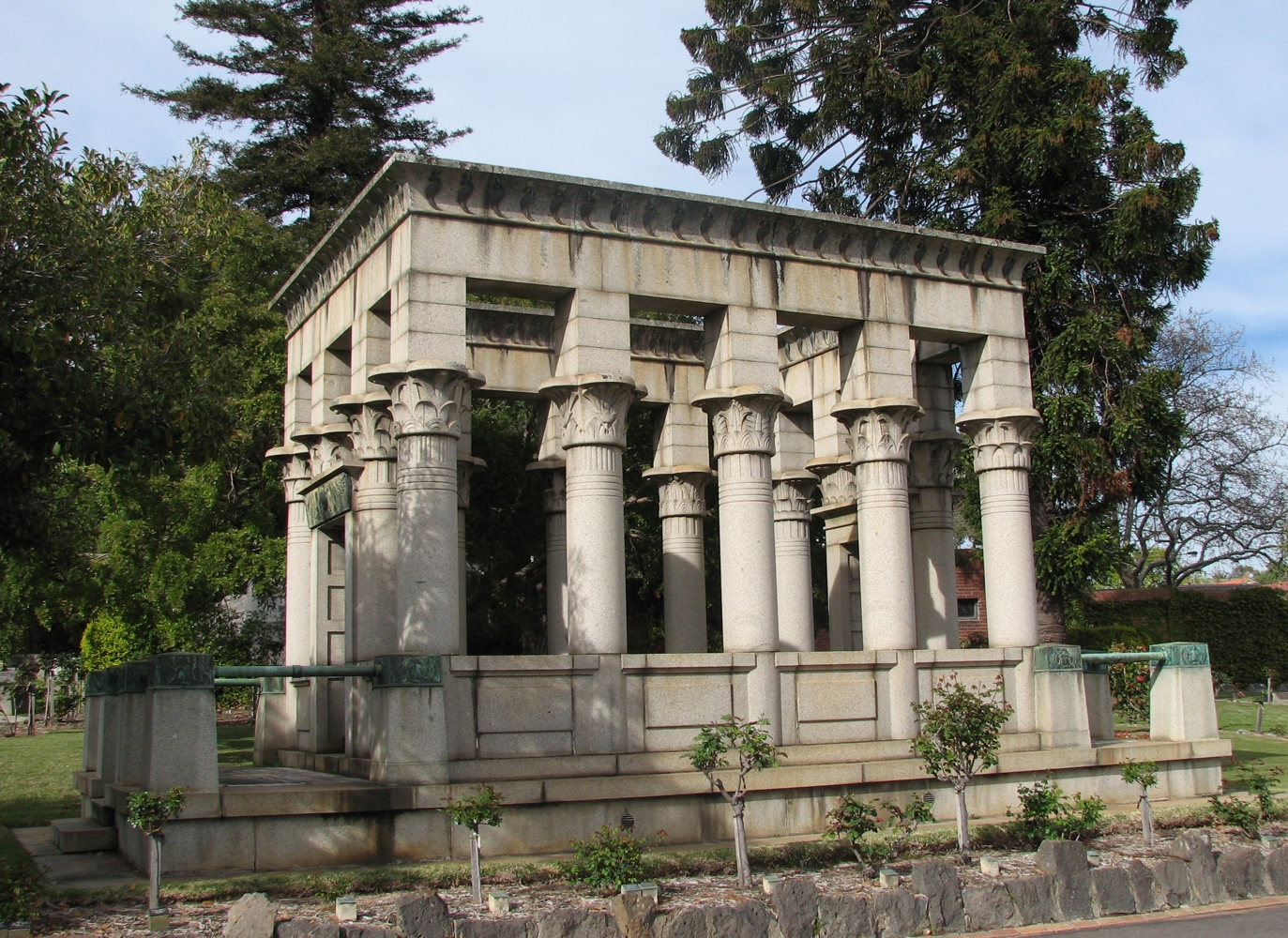
  The Syme Memorial
- Stanley Savige (1890–1954), soldier, founder of Legacy
- John Springthorpe (1855–1933), physician
- Nellie Stewart (1858–1931), actor and singer
- Edward Shaw (died 1889), New Zealand politician
- George Sutherland (1855–1905), author & journalist
- David Syme (1827–1908), newspaper proprietor
- Charles Alfred Topp (1847–1932), education administrator and public servant
- Camillo Triaca (1887–1972), sculptor, restaurateur
- Elise Wiedermann (1851–1922), soprano
- David Wang (1920–1978), retailer, councillor, Chinese community pioneer
- Basil Watson (1894–1917), aviator
- William Williams FLS (1848–1913), naturalist and Methodist minister
- John Wisker (1846–1884), British chess champion
- John Wren (1851–1953), bookmaker, businessman, political operator
- John Dickson Wyselaskie (1818–1883), grazier, benefactor
- Alberto Zelman (1874–1927), conductor, founder of Melbourne Symphony Orchestra

== War graves ==
The cemetery contains the war graves of 45 Commonwealth service personnel, 30 from World War I and 15 from World War II.

== Trees ==
The cemetery has a notable collection of mature trees including rows of Bhutan Cypress (Cupressus torulosa) and Italian cypress (Cupressus sempervirens 'Italica'), as well as specimens of Bunya Bunya (Araucaria bidwillii), Canary Island Pine (Pinus canariensis), Weeping Elms (Ulmus glabra 'Camperdownii'), Queensland Kauri (Agathis robusta) and Weeping Cypress (Cupressus funebris).
