= Cussen Memorial =

Heritage-listed monument in Melbourne, Victoria, Australia

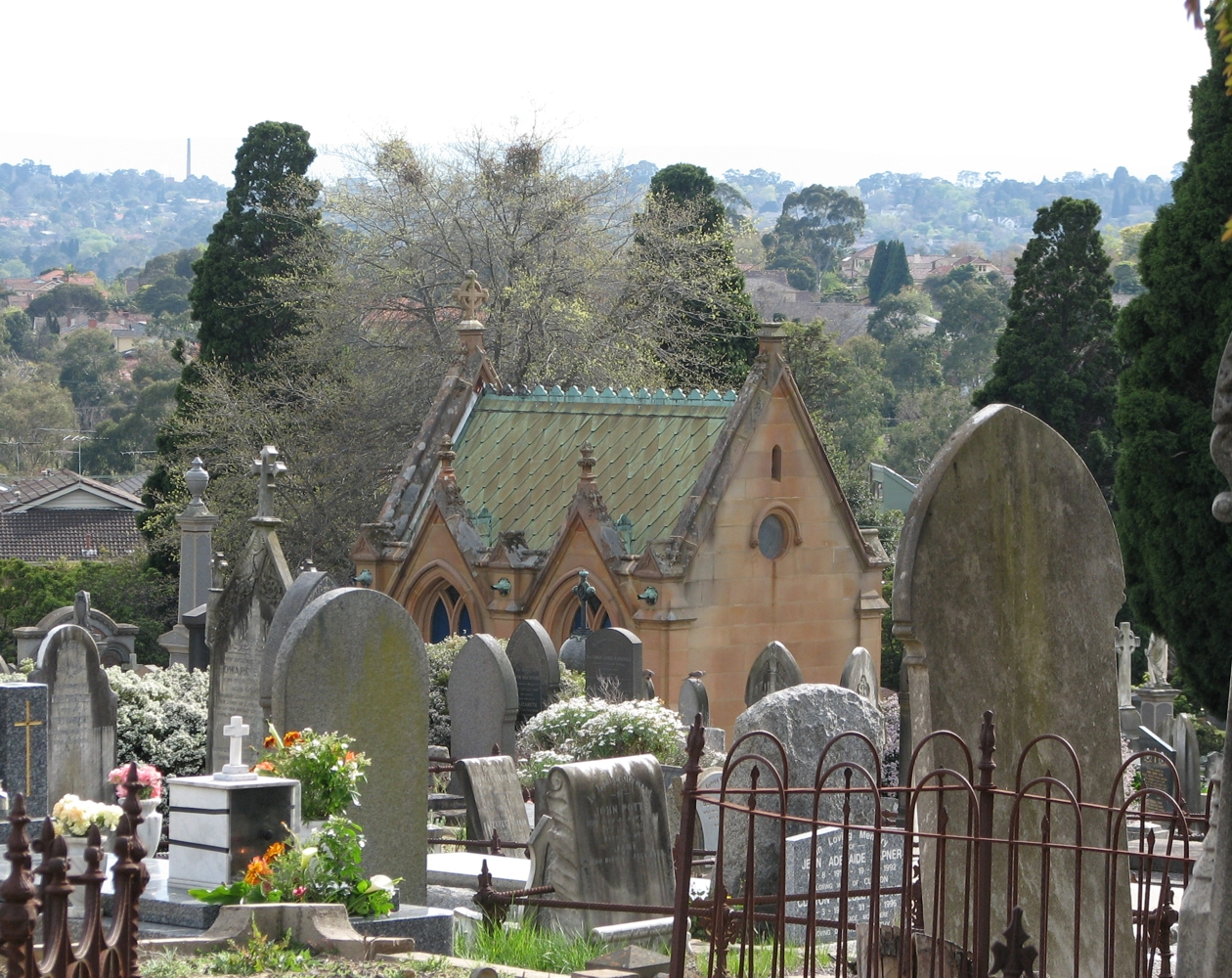
- The Cussen Memorial in 2006

- Location of the mausoleum in Great Metropolitan Melbourne
- Interactive map of Cussen Memorial
- Location: Roman Catholic section, Boroondara General Cemetery, Kew, City of Boroondara, Melbourne, Victoria, Australia
- Coordinates: 37°48′12″S 145°02′35″E
- Type: Memorial monument and mausoleum
- Beginning date: 1912
- Completion date: 1913; 113 years ago
- Dedicated to: Hubert Walter Cussen (d. 1911); also contains the graves of: Sir Leo Finn Bernard Cussen (d. 1933); Gerald Adrian Cussen (bur. 1951); John Bevan Cussen (bur. 1955); Johanna Cussen (bur. 1963); Richard William Cussen (bur. 1966); Marie Louise Cussen (bur. 1977); Maurice Leo Cussen (bur. 1979); Kevin Richard Cussen (bur. 1990); Alice Margaret Morrissey (bur. 1998)
- Commissioned by: Sir Leo Cussen

Site notes
- Architect(s): W. P. Conolly; Kempson and Conolly
- Architectural styles: Federation Gothic; Gothic Revival

Victorian Heritage Register
- Official name: Cussen Memorial
- Type: Registered place
- Designated: 13 November 2003
- Part of: Boroondara General Cemetery (VHR H0049)
- Reference no.: VHR H2036
- Heritage overlay no.: HO64
- Category: Cemeteries and Burial Sites

The Cussen Memorial, sometimes called the Leo Cussen Memorial, is a memorial monument and family mausoleum located in the Roman Catholic section of the Boroondara General Cemetery, at 430–440 High Street in Kew, in the City of Boroondara, in the inner eastern suburbs of Melbourne, in Victoria, Australia. Built initially as a memorial to one family member, as of 1998, the mausoleum held the remains of ten members of the Cussen family.

Built during 1912 and 1913 on the traditional lands of the Wurundjeri people, the mausoleum was added to the Victorian Heritage Register on 11 March 2004 in recognition of its architectural and historical significance; and the cemetery was also added to a non-statutory list by the Victorian branch of the National Trust on 1 September 1997.

== History ==
The Cussen Memorial is a mausoleum located within the Roman Catholic section of the Boroondara General Cemetery. The sandstone memorial is built in the Federation Gothic Revival style in the form of a small chapel with carvings, diamond shaped roof tiles and decorated ridge capping embellishing the exterior. The memorial occupies a landmark position within the cemetery. The Cussen Memorial was constructed in 1912–1913 by Sir Leo Cussen in memory of his son Hubert who died on 3 May 1911, aged 14 years.

Sir Leo was appointed to the bench of the Supreme Court of Victoria in 1906, where he displayed the qualities which were to mark him, in the words of Sir Owen Dixon, as the 'greatest of all judges', combining legal expertise with great humanity and practicality. Sir Leo was considered by Sir Robert Menzies as 'one of the great judges of the English speaking world'. In addition to his duties as a judge, Cussen accepted responsibility for the consolidations of the Victorian Acts of Parliament, which took place in 1915, and again in 1929. In 1922, after four years of labour over centuries of English legislation, he presented to the Victorian Parliament the Bill for the Imperial Acts Application Act, which was passed without amendment. Cussen was elected president of the Melbourne Cricket Club in 1907, a position he would hold until his death in 1933. In 1916, Cussen was appointed as a trustee of the State Library of Victoria, the Victoria Museum, and the National Gallery of Victoria, including serving as president of the trustees from 1928.

== Description ==
The architect for the Memorial was W. P. Conolly of the firm Kempson and Conolly. Conolly was one of the most prominent architects who designed Catholic churches in Melbourne in the late-nineteenth and early-twentieth centuries. Cussen's choice of architect for the memorial reflects his Catholic connections in Melbourne. In 1930, Conolly was asked by Lady Cussen to make alterations to the Cussen Memorial to allow for additional tombs. In spite of being built initially for Hubert Cussen, the Memorial has been strongly associated with Sir Leo Cussen since his burial there in 1933 and is often referred to as the Leo Cussen Memorial. Other members of the Cussen family have subsequently been interred in the mausoleum.

== See also ==
- Architecture of Melbourne
- List of places on the Victorian Heritage Register in the City of Boroondara
