= R. C. Flockart =

Methodist minister in Australia (1820–1898)

Robert Colquhoun Flockart (17 January 1820 – 29 January 1898) was a Wesleyan Methodist minister in colonial South Australia and Victoria; ranked Major Rev. Flockart, he was the first Methodist Chaplain-General of Australia.

== History ==
Flockart was born in Glasgow, Scotland, the son of John Flockhart and Isabel Flockart, née Sinclair.

Flockart was one of those who joined George Williams, John Christian Symons, (died 14 February 1894), and a few others (Note: But his name is not among Williams' famous "eleven friends" listed in the Wikipedia article) who, in 1844, constituted the first meeting of the Y.M.C.A.

He made three voyages to Australia as chaplain on convict transport ships, notably the Thomas Arbuthnot, which arrived 5 May 1847, and is reported to have preached at the original 1841 church in Collins Street in 1849.

After his marriage to Annie Munday they became Wesleyan missionaries, sailing to Australia aboard Randolph, acting as religious instructor on the voyage, arriving Melbourne on 8 August 1849, and entered the Methodist ministry in 1850. At Sydney they were met by Revs W. B. Boyce and Nathaniel Turner. At Hobart they met Rev. John Eggleston, and proceeded to South Australia, where the only Methodist ministers were D. J. Draper, R. C. Symons and W. Lowe (died 1891). Flockart spent 19 years in South Australia: Adelaide, Burra Burra (Kooringa), Kapunda, Mt Barker, Willunga, Gawler, and Brompton. All their children were born in Adelaide.

In 1868 Flockart was transferred to Victoria, his first circuit being Daylesford, followed by North Melbourne, Beechworth, Sale, Clunes, Bendigo, Geelong, Ballarat, and South Melbourne.

In 1885 Flockart was President of the Conference of the Victoria and Tasmania Wesleyan Methodist district. He retired in 1891 at the age of 71 years.

He died at his home, "Clydeville", Seymour Avenue, Malvern, although many references have Armadale, the location of his last parish.

Albert T. Holden (died 1935) succeeded Flockart as Wesleyan military chaplain in Victoria.

== Family ==
In 1849 Flockart married Ann Elizabeth "Annie" Munday (21 August 1821 – 18 August 1917), daughter of Isaac Munday, baker.

She was converted to Wesleyan Methodism in 1845 after hearing the famous preachers Robert Young, Robert Newton, Dr. Beaumont, and Dr. Dixon at the Hinde Street Wesleyan Church.

Their children included:

- Annie Elizabeth Flockart (1850 – 1 March 1870), died age 20.
- Robert Munday Flockart (20 May 1851 – )

- Robert Pearce "Bert" Flockart (14 November 1886 – 15 July 1915), killed at Gallipoli

- Joseph Frederick Flockart (10 December 1855 – ) founded the Victorian branch of the Commercial Travellers Association
- Rev. David Jonathan Flockart (1858– ) of Wangaratta
- Samuel Chalmers Flockart ( – ) of Clifton Hill
