= Paul MacGillivray =

British scientist (1834–1895)

Paul Howard MacGillivray (1834 – 9 June 1895) was a Scots-born surgeon and naturalist in Victoria, Australia.

== Early life ==
MacGillivray was born in Edinburgh to William MacGillivray and Marion MacGillivray née Askill. He was educated at Marischal College in the University of Aberdeen, where his father was appointed a professor in 1841, teaching natural history. While a student, Paul wrote and published A Catalogue of the Flowering Plants and Ferns growing in the neighbourhood of Aberdeen, with the help and support of his father. He gained his MA in 1851, but when his father died in September 1852, MacGillivray lost interest in science, and instead chose to study medicine in London; in 1855 he was elected a member of the Royal College of Surgeons. He joined the ship Cornwall, and in that year first visited Victoria.

== Migration to Australia ==
He returned on the same ship in 1857, and was appointed medical officer at Williamstowm, In Australia he continued his medical practice, and began working at Williamstown, where he joined the local volunteer fire brigade, and served as the brigade's medical officer. In 1862 he was appointed resident surgeon at the Bendigo Hospital, succeeding Dr Atkinson. He produced numerous papers and essays on surgical topics. In 1873 he left the hospital to establish a private practice in Bendigo, and in 1874 was elected president of the Medical Society of Victoria.

MacGillivray also became an important naturalist. He joined the Field Naturalists' Club of Victoria and gained a reputation as an observer, describing novel species of plumatella and studying the unique polyzoa of Australia, collected by the South Australian Museum and the "indefatigable" J. Bracebridge Wilson" around Port Phillip Heads. MacGillivray was elected a member of the Philosophical Institute (later Royal Society of Victoria).

== Death ==
MacGillivray had not completed a promised chapter on zoophytes and fossils for Sir Frederick McCoy's projected A Natural History of Australia, and was close to completing a monograph (on the Polyzoa of Victoria) for the Royal Society of Victoria, when he died on 9 July 1895 at his house on Forest Street, Bendigo.

The funeral was private; mourners included his brothers-in-law Robert L. J. Ellery and Charles Alfred Topp.

His will stipulated that all his property be liquidated and invested, the interest being for the benefit of his widow.

His collections, papers, findings and library were donated to the National Museum of Victoria by the government shortly after his death.

== Family ==
On 28 August 1866 MacGillivray married Isabella Audley Shields (1842 – 11 September 1917), daughter of Dr John Shields of Launceston, Tasmania.; they had one son and five daughters: Their son, William MacGillivray, was presumed dead in 1902 nothing having been heard of him since December 1895 at Cue, Western Australia, his last known address.

John MacGillivray, naturalist and explorer of Papua New Guinea and nearby islands, was a brother.
