= Fitchett =

Fitchett is a surname. Notable people with the surname include:

- Alfred Fitchett CMG (1836–1929), Dean of Dunedin from 1894 to 1929
- Billy Fitchett (1872–1952), Anglican bishop in New Zealand
- Chris Fitchett, Australian writer, producer and script editor
- Frederick Fitchett CMG (1851–1930), Member of Parliament from Dunedin, New Zealand
- Jack Fitchett (1879–1938), English footballer
- John Fitchett (poet) (1776–1838), English poet
- Margaret Fitchett (1875–1958), sometimes called Daisy Fitchett, New Zealand artist
- Michael Fitchett (Australian sportsman) (born 1927), first-class cricketer for Victoria and Australian rules footballer
- Michael Fitchett (basketball) (born 1982), New Zealand former professional basketball player
- William Henry Fitchett (1841–1928), Australian journalist, minister, educator, founding president of the Methodist Ladies' College, Melbourne
- John Fitchett Marsh (1818–1880), English solicitor, official and antiquary

== See also ==
- Feytiat
- Fitch (disambiguation)
- Phichit
- Vichot
