= 1928 Birthday Honours =

British government recognitions

The 1928 Birthday Honours were appointments by King George V to various orders and honours to reward and highlight good works by citizens of the British Empire. The appointments were made to celebrate the official birthday of The King, and were published in The London Gazette on 4 June 1928.

The recipients of honours are displayed here as they were styled before their new honour, and arranged by honour, with classes (Knight, Knight Grand Cross, etc.) and then divisions (Military, Civil, etc.) as appropriate.

== United Kingdom and British Empire ==
=== Baron ===
- Sir George Rowland Blades Bt GBE MP by the name, style and title of Baron Ebbisham, of Cobham in the County of Surrey. President of the Federation of British Industries. Lord Mayor of London 1926-27. For public services.
- The Rt. Hon. Sir Alfred Moritz Mond Bt MP by the name, style and title of Baron Melchett, of Landford in the County of Southampton. For public and political services.
- Sir James Farquharson Remnant Bt CBE MP by the name, style and title of Baron Remnant, of Wenhaston in the County of Suffolk. Member of Parliament for Holborn since March 1900. For political and public services.

=== Privy Councillor ===
The King appointed the following to His Majesty's Most Honourable Privy Council:

- Godfrey Lampson Tennyson Locker-Lampson MP Member of Parliament for Salisbury January, 1910–18, and for Wood Green Division since December, 1918. Under Secretary of State for Foreign Affairs since December 1925, and for Home Affairs, 1923–24, and November 1924-December 1925

=== Baronetcies ===
- The Rt. Hon. Edward Mervyn Archdale JP DL Minister of Agriculture for Northern Ireland
- William Walter Carlile OBE JP DL Member of Parliament for Buckingham Division 1895-1906. Chairman of the Magisterial Bench, Buckinghamshire, For political and public services in Buckinghamshire.
- Major William Cope TD JP MP Member of Parliament for Llandaff and Barry Division since December 1918. Comptroller of His Majesty's Household since January 1928. Lord Commissioner of His Majesty's Treasury March 1923 to January 1924, and November 1924 to January 1928
- Sir Havilland Walter de Sausmarez, Bailiff of Guernsey
- Robert Williams DL Managing Director of Tanganyika Concessions

=== Knight Bachelor ===
- John Sandeman Allen JP MP Member of Parliament for West Derby Division of Liverpool since 1924. Member of the Council of the International Chamber of Commerce and Acting Chairman (Chairman Designate) of the Royal Colonial Institute. For political and public services.
- Reginald Mitchell Banks KC MP Member of Parliament for Swindon Division of Wiltshire since November 1922. Recorder of Wigan since April 1928. For political and public services.
- Walter Baker Clode KC President, Railway Rates Tribunal. Chairman, Rates Advisory Committee, Ministry of Transport
- Cecil Allen Coward, President of the Law Society
- Professor William Alexander Craigie Joint Editor of the Oxford English Dictionary. Professor of English in the University of Chicago
- Brigadier-General James Edward Edmonds CB CMG Director of the Military Branch, Historical Section, Committee of Imperial Defence
- Sydney James Gammell. For political and public services in the North East of Scotland.
- John Marice Æmilius Gatti JP Ex-Chairman of the London County Council
- Henry Cubitt Gooch DL For political and public service's in the County of London. Member of Parliament for Peckham 1908-10 and member of the London County Council for 15 years, being Chairman 1923-24
- Victor Raphael Harari Pasha CMG Director of the National Bank of Egypt and of the Agricultural Bank of Egypt. A leading member of the British community in Cairo. For services over a long period in promoting trade and commerce between England and Egypt
- Enoch Hill JP For political and public services in Yorkshire. Chairman of the Building Societies Association
- James Atkinson Hosker MRCS DL For political and public services in Bournemouth. Chairman of the Bournemouth Conservative Association
- Archibald Hurd, Author of many works on Naval subjects
- George Aitken Clark Hutchison KC JP MP Member of Parliament for the Northern Division of Midlothian and Peebles, 1922–23 and since October 1924, and three times contested Argyllshire in the Unionist interest. For political and public services.
- James Hopwood Jeans FRS Member of the Advisory Council for Scientific and Industrial Research. Secretary of the Royal Society
- John Buck Lloyd, Junior, Financial Director of the Anglo-Persian Oil Company
- Henry Thomas McAuliffe, FCA Member of the Corporation of the City of London; and Chairman of the Finance Committee for seven years
- Percy Graham MacKinnon, Chairman of Lloyd's
- Ernest Louis Meinertzhagen JP Senior London County Council Member for Chelsea for over 20 years. Chairman of Chelsea Conservative Association. For public and political services.
- Benjamin Howell Morgan, Chairman of British Empire Producers Organisation. For public services.
- Francis Morris JP Chairman of the Metropolitan Asylums Board
- James Openshaw OBE JP DL For political and public services in Lancashire. President and Chairman of the Fylde Conservative Association
- Max Pemberton JP Author, Director of the London School of Journalism
- Lieutenant-Colonel Charles Pinkham OBE JP DL Chairman of the Middlesex County Council
- Nigel Playfair, Manager of the Lyric Theatre, Hammersmith
- Reginald Ward Edward Lane Poole, For political and public services.
- Spencer John Portal JP Chairman of the Trustee Savings Banks Association, Chairman of the London Savings Bank
- Lieutenant-Colonel Hugh Bateman Protheroe-Smith OBE Chief Constable, Cornwall. For services in the above-mentioned capacity and in connection with the relief of the Cornish tin miners and their families
- George Stuart Robertson KC FSA Chief Registrar of Friendly Societies
- Alderman Samuel Thomas Talbot DL For political and public services in Birmingham
- Thomas Marris Taylor CBE JP Vice Chairman of the Special Grants Committee, Ministry of Pensions
- Gilbert Christopher Vyle, President, Association of British Chambers of Commerce, 1926–28
- Henry Walker CBE His Majesty's Chief Inspector of Mines
- Thomas Watts MP Member of Parliament for Withington Division of Manchester November 1922-23 and since October 1924. For political and public services.
- Colonel Albert Edward Whitaker CBE TD DL For political and public services in Nottinghamshire.
- Thomas White JP Chairman of the Central Valuation Committee for England and Wales

Dominions

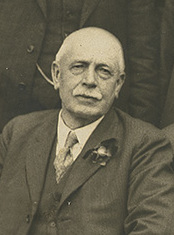
Sir George Fowlds

- Murray Bissett, Senior Judge of the High Court of Southern Rhodesia
- The Hon. George Fowlds CBE President of Auckland University College, Dominion of New Zealand; for public services.
- John Melrose, a prominent pastoralist in the State of South Australia; in recognition of his charitable services.
- Lieutenant-Colonel Henry Simpson Newland CBE DSO a leading surgeon of Adelaide, State of South Australia
- Captain George Hubert Wilkins MC distinguished Australian aviator and explorer

British India

- Khan Bahadur Muhammad Usman Sahib Bahadur, Member of the Executive Council of the Governor of Madras
- Babu Ganesh Datta Singh, Minister in charge of the Ministry of Local Self-Government, Bihar and Orissa
- Maulavi Saiyid Muhammad Saadulla, Minister, Assam
- Justice Alan Brice Broadway, Senior Puisne Judge, High Court of Judicature at Lahore
- Justice Benjamin Lindsay, Puisne Judge, High Court of Judicature at Allahabad
- Justice Henry Sheldon Pratt, Judge, High Court of Judicature at Rangoon
- Jamshedji Behramji Kanga JP Advocate-General, Bombay
- Captain Edward James Headlam CSI CMG DSO Director of the Royal Indian Marine
- Lieutenant-Colonel George Henry Willis CIE MVO Royal Engineers, Master of the Security Printing Press at Nasik
- Muhammad Akbar Nazar Ali Hydari, Nawab Hydar Nawaz Jang Bahadur, Sadr-ul-Maham, Finance Department, His Exalted Highness the Nizam's Government
- Hadji Abdul Karim Abu Ahmed Khan Ghuznavi, Member of the Bengal Legislative Council
- Austin Low CIE Chairman, Messrs. Griridlay & Co.

Colonies, Protectorates, etc.

- Kitoyi Ajasa OBE Unofficial Member of the Legislative Council of Nigeria
- Christian Ludolph Neethling Felling CMG General Manager, Kenya and Uganda Railways
- Ewen Reginald Logan, Judge of the High Court, Northern Rhodesia
- Thomas Laurence Roxburgh CMG Unofficial Member of the Privy Council of Jamaica
- Gualterus Stewart Schneider, Senior Puisne Judge of the Supreme Court, Ceylon

=== The Most Ancient and Most Noble Order of the Thistle ===
==== Knight of the Most Ancient and Most Noble Order of the Thistle (KT) ====
- Victor Alexander John, Marquess of Linlithgow OBE TD DL

=== The Most Honourable Order of the Bath ===
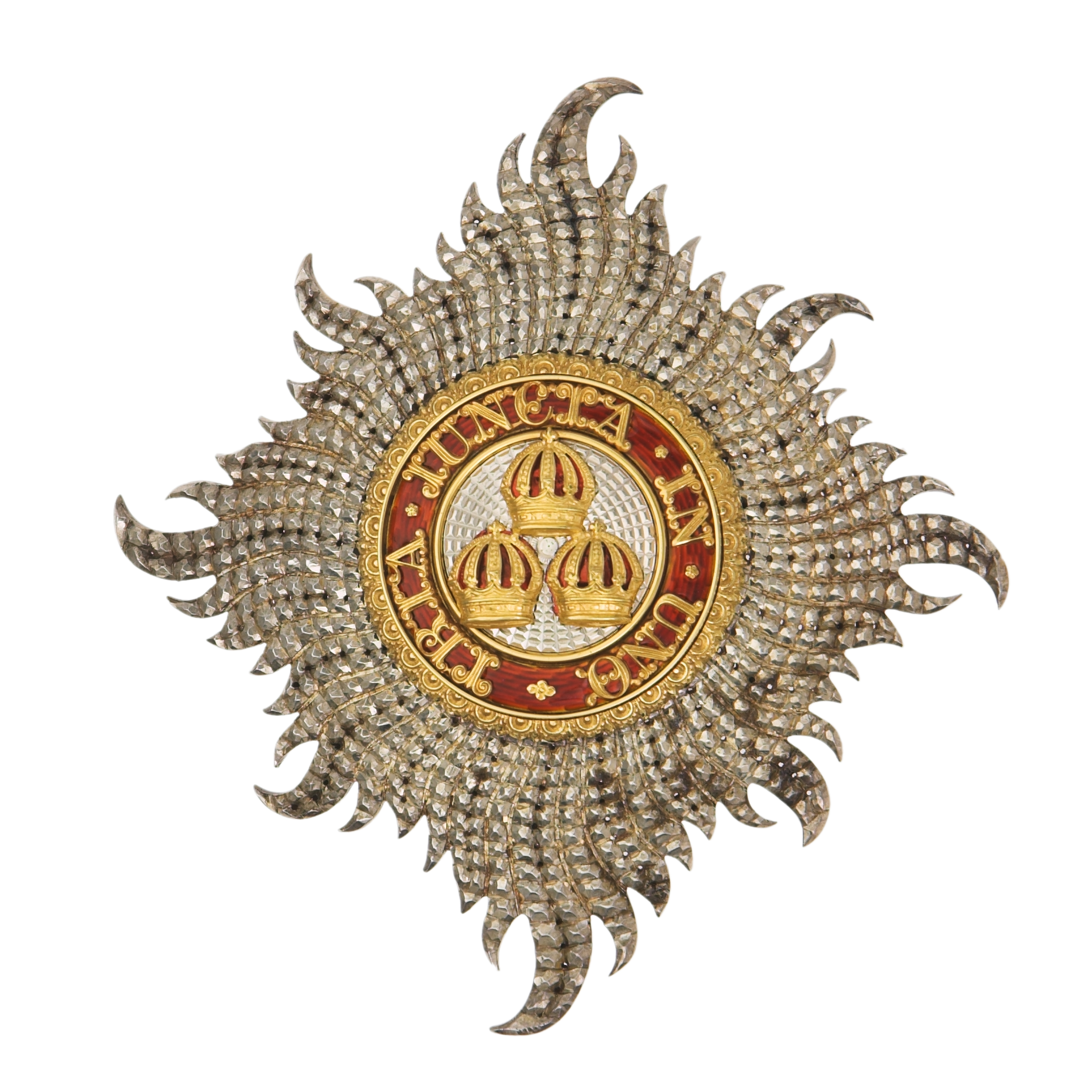
Civil star of the Knight Grand Cross of the Order of the Bath

==== Knight Grand Cross of the Order of the Bath (GCB) ====
===== Military Division =====
Royal Navy

- Admiral of the Fleet Sir Henry Francis Oliver KCB KCMG MVO

Army

- General Sir John Philip Du Cane KCB Colonel Commandant, Royal Artillery, Aide-de-Camp General to The King, Governor and Commander-in-Chief, Malta and its Dependencies
- General Sir George de Symons Barrow KCB KCMG Indian Army, Colonel 14/20th Hussars, Colonel, The Scinde Horse (14th Prince of Wales's Own Cavalry), Indian Army late General Officer. Commanding-in-Chief, Eastern Command, India

===== Civil Division =====
- The Rt. Hon. Sir Esmé William Howard GCMG KCB CVO His Majesty's Ambassador at Washington, D.C.

==== Knight Commander of the Order of the Bath (KCB) ====
===== Military Division =====
Royal Navy

- Vice-Admiral Cyril Thomas Moulden Fuller CB CMG DSO

Royal Air Force

- Air Vice-Marshal Sir John Frederick Andrews Higgins KBE CB DSO AFC

===== Civil Division =====
- Sir Ernest Arthur Gowers KBE CB Chairman, Board of Inland Revenue
- Maurice Linford Gwyer CB Solicitor to the Treasury
- Oswald Richard Arthur Simpkin CB CBE Public Trustee
- Sir Charles John Howell Thomas CMG Permanent Secretary, Ministry of Agriculture and Fisheries

==== Companion of the Order of the Bath (CB) ====
===== Military Division =====
Royal Navy

- Rear-Admiral John Moore Casement
- Rear-Admiral the Hon. Matthew Robert Best DSO MVO
- Rear-Admiral Humphrey Thomas Walwyn DSO
- Engineer Rear-Admiral Hugh Sydney Garwood OBE

Army

- The Reverend Alfred Charles Eustace Jarvis CMG MC Chaplain General to the Forces (Chaplain to The King), Chaplain, Tower of London
- Major-General Harold Ben Fawcus CMG DSO Deputy Director General; Army Medical Services, War Office'
- Colonel Reginald John Thornton Hildyard CMG DSC Brigade Commander, 2nd Rhine Brigade, The British Army of the Rhine
- Colonel Horace de Courcy Martelli DSO Commanding Royal Artillery, 42nd (East Lancashire) Division, Western Command
- Colonel Evan Maclean Jack CMG DSO Director General, Ordnance Survey, Ministry of Agriculture and Fisheries
- Colonel Arthur Edward McNamara CMG DSO Commandant, Small Arms School, Netheravon
- Colonel Henry Barstow CBE Indian Army, Commander, Delhi Independent Brigade Area, India
- Colonel William Albany Fetherstonhaugh CBE DSO Indian Army, Commandant Lahore Base Sub-area, and Brigade Commander, Lahore Brigade Area, India
- Colonel William Marshall Fordham CBE Indian Army, Deputy Adjutant and Quartermaster General, Eastern Command, India
- Colonel Harold Boulton CBE Indian Medical Service, V.H.S., Assistant Director of Medical Services, Deccan District, India

Royal Air Force

- Air Commodore Edgar Rainey Ludlow-Hewitt CMG DSO MC

===== Civil Division =====
- Colonel Richard Vernon Tredinnick Ford CBE RM
- Colonel John Edward Sarson OBE VD TD DL late 1st Volunteer Battalion, the Leicestershire Regiment, Honorary Colonel 4th Battalion, The Leicestershire Regiment
- James Sidney Barnes OBE Assistant Secretary, Admiralty
- Charles Patrick Duff CVO Private Secretary to the Prime Minister
- Colonel Herbert Tom Goodland DSO Deputy Controller, Imperial War Grave's Commission, France and Flanders
- Edgar Hackforth, Deputy Controller, Ministry of Health
- James Stirling Ross CBE Director of Accounts, Air Ministry

=== Order of Merit (OM) ===
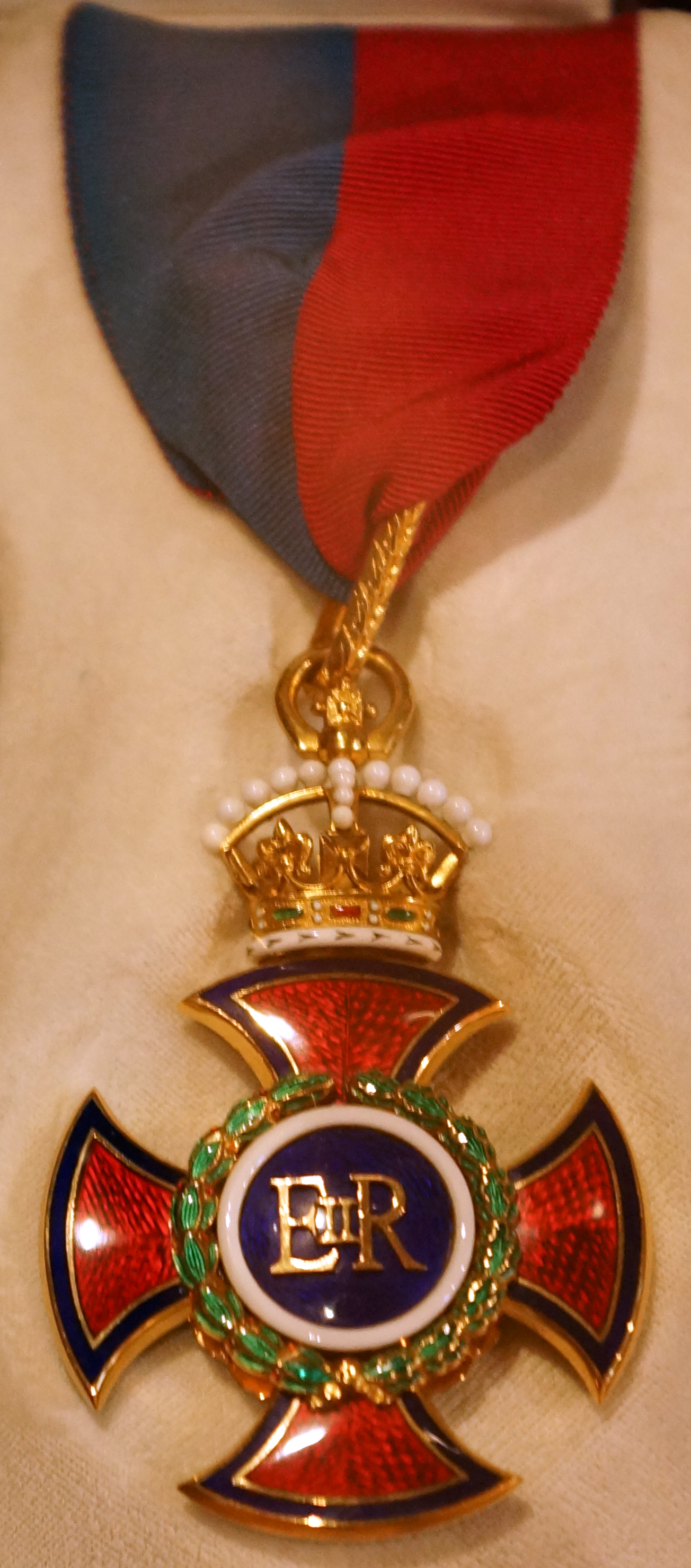
The riband and badge of the Order of Merit

- Sir George Abraham Grierson KCIE In recognition of his eminent position as an Oriental Scholar and of the value to the Empire of his work on Indian Languages and Dialects

=== The Most Exalted Order of the Star of India ===
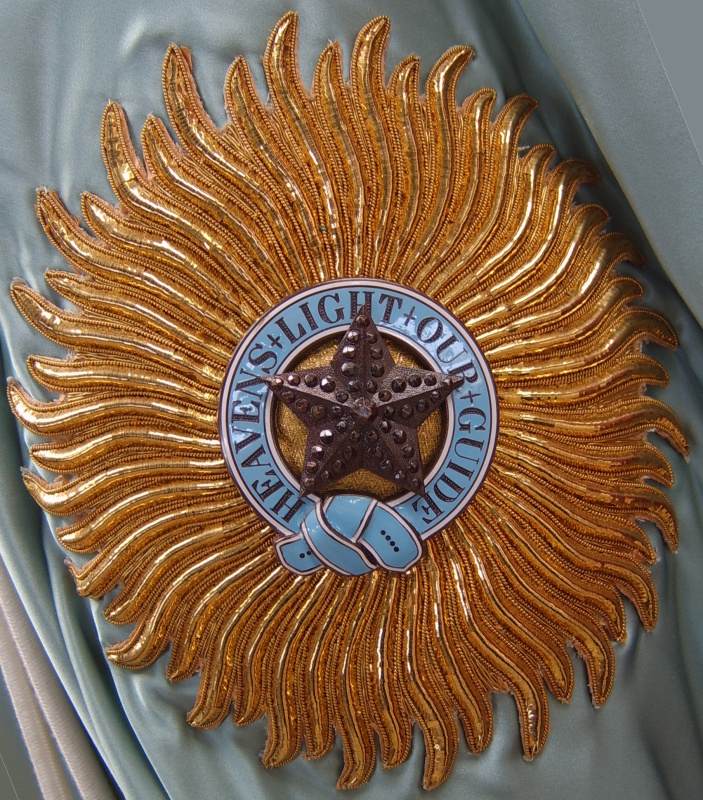
Star of a Knight Grand Commander of the Most Exalted Order of the Star of India

==== Knight Grand Commander (GCSI) ====
- Sir Spencer Harcourt Butler GCIE KCSI ex-Governor of Burma

==== Knight Commander (KCSI) ====
- Sir William John Keith CIE Indian Civil Service, late Finance Member of the Executive Council of the Governor of Burma

==== Companion (CSI) ====
- Leonard William Reynolds CIE MC Indian Civil Service, Agent to the Governor-General, Rajputana, and Chief Commissioner, Ajmer-Merwara
- Hopetoun Gabriel Stokes CIE Indian Civil Service, Member, Board of Revenue, Madras
- Rana Bhagat Chand, Raja of Jubbal, Simla Hill States
- James Campbell Ker CIE Indian Civil Service, Private Secretary to His Excellency the Governor of Bombay
- Maurice George Simpson, Director-in-Chief, Indo-European Telegraph Department

=== The Most Distinguished Order of Saint Michael and Saint George ===
Star of the Order of Saint Michael and Saint George.

==== Knight Grand Cross of the Order of St Michael and St George (GCMG) ====
- Sir Charles Thomas Davis KCMG Permanent Under-Secretary of State for Dominion Affairs
- Sir Reginald Edward Stubbs Captain-General and Governor-in-Chief of Jamaica

==== Knight Commander of the Order of St Michael and St George (KCMG) ====
- Brigadier-General Sir Joseph Aloysius Byrne KBE CB Governor and Commander-in-Chief of Sierra Leone
- The Rt. Hon. Isaac Alfred Isaacs, Senior Puisne Justice of the High Court of Australia
- The Right Reverend Henry Hutchinson Montgomery Prelate of the Most Distinguished Order of Saint Michael and Saint George
- Lieutenant-Colonel Sir William Thomas Prout Kt CMG OBE Senior Medical Adviser to the Colonial Office
- Ernest Amelius Rennie MVO His Majesty's Envoy Extraordinary and Minister Plenipotentiary to the Republic of Finland

==== Companion of the Order of St Michael and St George (CMG) ====
- D'Arcy Wentworth Addison MVO ISO Under-Secretary for the State of Tasmania, Chief Electoral Officer and Clerk to the Executive Council
- Robert John Boyne, Government Representative on the Canned Fruit Export Control Board, Commonwealth of Australia
- Robert William Dalton, His Majesty's Senior Trade Commissioner in the Commonwealth of Australia
- The Very Reverend Alfred Robertson Fitchett Dean of Dunedin, Dominion of New Zealand
- Henry James Manson, New Zealand Trade Commissioner in the Commonwealth of Australia
- Cyril Wilson Alexander, Acting Lieutenant Governor of the Northern Provinces, Protectorate of Nigeria
- Hubert Russell Cowell, Assistant Secretary, Colonial Office
- Herbert Henniker-Heaton, Colonial Secretary, Bermuda
- John Lisseter Humphreys CBE Governor of the State of North Borneo
- Reginald Fleming Johnston CBE Commissioner of Wei-hai-Wei
- Lieutenant-Colonel Leonard Fielding Nalder CIE CBE Anglor, Iraq. Delegate on the Turco-Iraq Frontier Delimitation Commission
- John Hope Reford lately Director of Medical and Sanitary Services, Uganda Protectorate
- Major Arthur Henry Chamberlain Walker-Leigh, Chief Commissioner, Northern Territories of the Gold Coast
- Henry James Brett, Acting Commercial Counsellor, Shanghai. Lancelot Giles, His Majesty's Consul at Swatow
- Ernest Hamilton Holmes, His Majesty's Consul-General at Yokohama
- Richard Edwardes More OBE Sudan Agent at Cairo
- Arthur Langford Sholto Rowley, His Majesty's Consul-General at Antwerp
- Brevet Lieutenant-Colonel Rupert Sumner Ryan RA DSO Deputy British High Commissioner on the Inter-Allied Rhineland High Commission

=== The Most Eminent Order of the Indian Empire ===
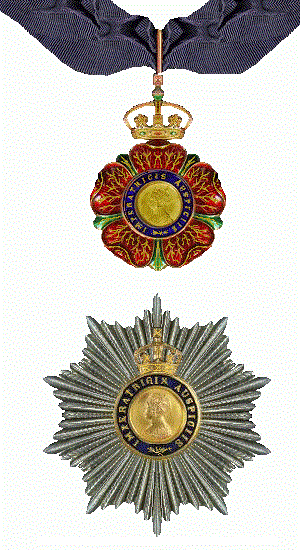
Riband, badge and star of the Knight Grand Commander of the Order of the Indian Empire

==== Knight Grand Commander (GCIE) ====
- Sir William Malcolm Hailey KCSI CIE Governor of the Punjab

==== Knight Commander (KCIE) ====
- Lieutenant Nawab Muhammad Ahmad Sa'id Khan CIE MBE of Chhatari, Home Member of the Executive Council of the Governor of the United Provinces
- Reginald Isidore Robert Glancy CSI CIE Indian Civil Service, Agent to the Governor-General in Central India
- Maharaja Bahadur Kshaunish Chandra Ray, of Nadia, Vice-President of the Executive Council of the Governor of Bengal (posthumous)

==== Companion (CIE) ====
- Darbar Shri Vala Mulu Surag, Jurisdictional Talukdar of Jetpur-Pithadiah, States of Western India
- George Goodair Dey, Chief Engineer and Secretary to the Government of Bengal in the Public Works Department
- John Godfrey Beazley, Indian Civil Service, Secretary to the Government of the Punjab in the Transferred Departments
- Algernon Earle Gilliat, Indian Civil Service, Secretary to the Government of Burma in the Finance Department
- Richard Henry Beckett, Director of Public Instruction and Secretary to the Government of the Central Provinces in the Education Department
- Theodore Benfey Copeland, Indian Civil Service
- Francis Graham Arnould, Chief Engineer, Bombay, Baroda and Central India Railway
- Charlton Scott Cholmeley Harrison, Chief Engineer, Lloyd Barrage and Canals Construction, Karachi, Bombay
- Arthur Henderson Mackenzie, Director of Public Instruction, United Provinces
- George Arthur Cocks CBE Inspector-General of Police, Punjab
- Colonel Clarence Preston Gunter OBE Director, Frontier Circle, Survey of India
- Professor Reginald Coupland, lately Member of the Royal Commission on the Superior Civil Services in India
- William Stenning Hopkyns OBE Indian Civil Service
- Lieutenant-Colonel Ernest William Charles Bradfield OBE Indian Medical Service, Professor of Surgery, Medical College, and Superintendent, General Hospital, Madras
- Lieutenant-Colonel Lewis Cook, Indian Medical Service, Civil Surgeon, Bhagalpur, Bihar and Orissa
- Lieutenant-Colonel George Denne Franklin OBE Indian Medical Service, late Chief Medical Officer, Delhi
- Lieutenant-Colonel Robert Ross Will DSO VD Commandant, the Bengal Artillery Force
- Lieutenant-Colonel John Cunningham, Indian Medical Service, Director, Pasteur Institute, Kasauli
- Herbert Aubrey Francis Metcalfe MVO Secretary to the Chief Commissioner, North-West Frontier Province
- Valangiman Krishnaswami Ayangar Aravamudha Ayangar, Indian Audit and Account Service, officiating Under Secretary to the Government of India, Commerce Department
- Sydney David Smith, Deputy Commissioner of Excise, Bombay
- George Edward Campbell Wakefield OBE Police and Public Works Minister, Jammu and Kashmir State
- Raj Bahadur Badridas Goenka, Member of the Bengal Legislative Council
- Hugh Gordon Roberts Welsh Mission at Shillong, Assam
- John Augustus Voelcker of the Royal Agricultural Society of England

=== Imperial Order of the Crown of India ===
- Her Highness the Senior Maharani Shrimati Chinkooraja Scindia, of Gwalior

=== The Royal Victorian Order ===
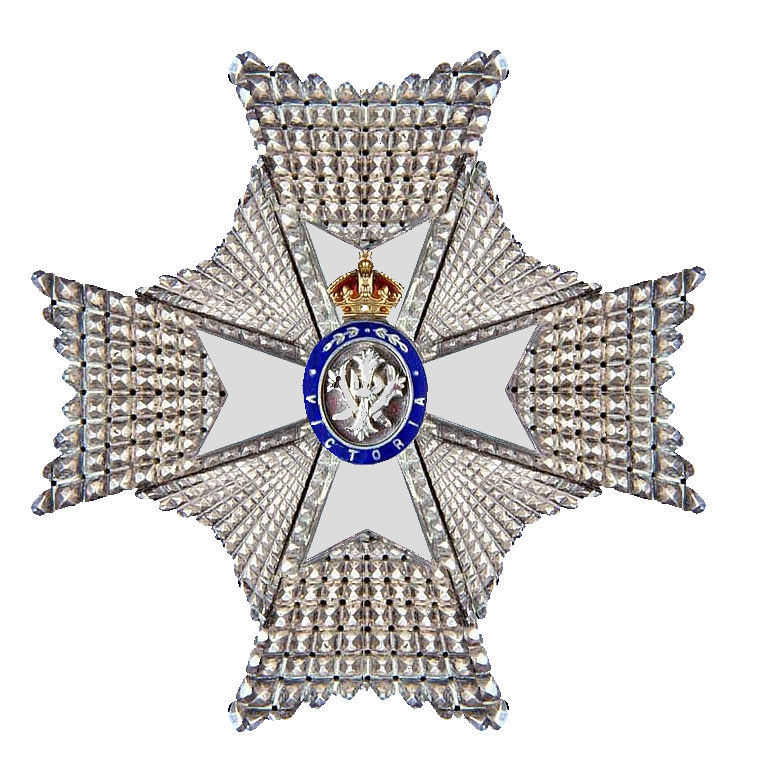
Insignia of a Knight / Dames Commander of the Royal Victorian Order

==== Knight Grand Cross of the Royal Victorian Order (GCVO) ====
- The Rt. Hon. William Heneage, Earl of Dartmouth KCB
- Major-General The Hon. Sir Cecil Edward Bingham KCMG CB CVO

==== Knight Commander of the Royal Victorian Order (KCVO) ====
- Sir Hugh Percy Allen CVO
- Sir Charles John Holmes
- John Marnoch CVO, Surgeon
- Major Philip Hunloke CVO

==== Commander of the Royal Victorian Order (CVO) ====
- The Hon. Montague Charles Eliot MVO OBE
- Sir John Prosser, lawyer (d.1945)
- Charles John Dalrymple-Hay MVO
- Alfred Bakewell Howitt (Dated 21 April 1928)

==== Member of the Royal Victorian Order, 4th class (MVO) ====
- Major Alexander Kilgour Macpherson, 10/2nd Bombay Pioneers
- Captain Herbert Pott RN

==== Member of the Royal Victorian Order, 5th class (MVO) ====
- James Atkinson
- William Henry Reed

=== The Most Excellent Order of the British Empire ===
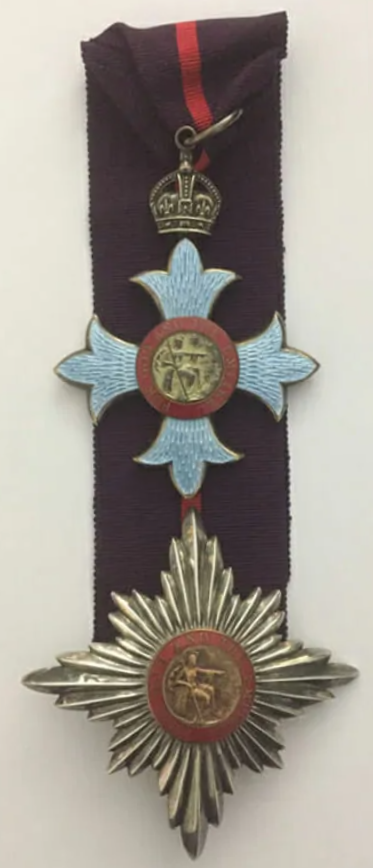
Knight Commander of the Order of the British Empire, insignia 1917–35

==== Knight Grand Cross of the Order of the British Empire (GBE) ====
===== Civil Division =====
- Sir John Dewrance KBE For public and political services.
- Brigadier-General Sir Henry Percy Maybury KCMG CB MInstCE JP Director General of Roads, Ministry of Transport
- Sir John Hubert Oakley, Member of the Irish Grants Committee

Diplomatic Service and Overseas List

- Sir William Grenfell Max-Muller KCMG CB MVO lately His Majesty's Envoy Extraordinary and Minister Plenipotentiary at Warsaw

==== Dame Commander of the Order of the British Empire (DBE) ====
- Elizabeth Wordsworth late Principal of Lady Margaret Hall, Oxford
- Eadith Campbell Walker CBE For philanthropic and charitable services in the State of New South Wales

==== Knight Commander of the Order of the British Empire (KBE) ====
===== Military Division =====
Royal Navy

- Vice-Admiral Aubrey Clare Hugh Smith CB MVO (retired)

Army

- Major-General Walter Holland Ogilvie CB CMG Indian Medical Service, Director of Medical Services, Army Headquarters, India
- Major-General Casimir Cartwright van Straubenzee CB CMG General Officer Commanding Straits Settlements, Malaya

===== Civil Division =====
- Alderman George Bevan Bowen JP DL For political and public services in Pembrokeshire
- Colonel Robert Arthur Johnson CBE TD Deputy Master, Royal Mint
- William Maitland-Heriot CBE DL For political and public services in Dumfriesshire
- Sir Edward Nicholl JP DL For political and public services.
- Sir Hugh William Orange CB CIE Accountant General, Board of Education
- Nathaniel Francis Banner Osborn CB Director of Army Contracts, War Office
- Major Percival Reuben Reynolds OBE Ex-President of the National Association of British and Irish Millers

Diplomatic Service and Overseas List

- Josiah Crosby CIE OBE His Majesty's Consul-General, at Batavia
- Herbert Goffe CMG lately one of His Majesty's Consuls-General in China
- Lieutenant-Colonel Lionel Berkeley Holt Haworth, Political Resident in the Persian Gulf

Dominions

- Colonel Ernest Haviland Hiley CBE late Chairman of the Rhodesian Railway Commission
- Lieutenant-Colonel the Hon. James Anderson Murdoch CMG Member of the Legislative Council, State of New South Wales. For public and charitable services.

Colonies, Protectorates, etc.

- Harold Baxter Kittermaster CMG OBE Governor and Commander-in-Chief of the Somaliland Protectorate
- William Peel CMG Chief Secretary to Government, Federated Malay States
- Lieutenant-Colonel George Stewart Symes CMG DSO Chief Secretary to the Government of Palestine; Resident and Commander-in-Chief designate at Aden

==== Commander of the Order of the British Empire (CBE) ====
===== Military Division =====
Royal Navy

- Captain the Hon. Arthur Charles Strutt ADC
- Surgeon Captain James Herbert Fergusson
- Paymaster Captain Harry George Wilson

Army

- Lieutenant-Colonel and Brevet Colonel Granville Arthur Battcock TD 4th Battalion The Royal Berkshire Regiment (Princess Charlotte of Wales's) Territorial Army
- Colonel Howard Ensor CB CMG DSO late Royal Army Medical Corps, Deputy Director of Medical Services, North China Command
- Colonel John Standish Surtees Prendergast, Viscount Gort VC DSO MVO MC late Grenadier Guards, General Staff Officer, 1st Grade, 4th Division, Eastern Command
- Lieutenant-Colonel Lancelot Noel Friedrick Irving King OBE Royal Engineers, Senior British Commissioner, Jubaland Boundary Commission
- Colonel Alfred Sinclair Marriott, Indian Army, Director of Farms, Master-General of Supply Branch, Army Headquarters, India
- Lieutenant-Colonel Chilton Lind Addison-Smith OBE 3rd Battalion The Seaforth Highlanders (Ross-shire Buffs, The Duke of Albany's)
- Colonel Harry Reginald Walter Marriott Smith DSO late Royal Artillery, Director of Artillery, War Office
- Colonel John Lindsay Smith, Indian Army, Deputy Director of Supplies and Transport, Northern Command, India
- Principal Matron Catherine Geddes Stronach RRC Queen Alexandra's Imperial Military Nursing Service
- Colonel Douglas Vere Willoughby DSO Indian Army, Officer Commanding 4th/1st Punjab Regiment, Indian Army
- Quartermaster and Lieutenant-Colonel Stephen Wright OBE DCM lately employed as Inspector of Army Catering, Department of the Quartermaster-General to the Forces, War Office

Royal Air Force

- Group Captain George Laing OBE

===== Civil Division =====
- Jameson Boyd Adams DSO Divisional Controller, North Eastern Division, Ministry of Labour
- Frederick James Adye, Secretary, Pacific Cable Board
- Charles Francis Ball DL For political and public services in Letchworth
- Edward Gordon Beam, Chief Inspector, Outdoor Insurance Staff, Ministry of Health
- Sir George Menteth Boughey Bt OBE Secretary, Royal Colonial Institute
- William Allport Brockington OBE Director of Education, Leicestershire
- William Henry Carter, Assistant Director of Naval Construction, Admiralty
- James Walker Clark JP President of the Halifax Chamber of Commerce
- John Clark JP FEIS Director of Education, Glasgow Education Authority
- David Davis JP DL Chairman of London Insurance Committee
- Gwendolyne Denton. For political services.
- Major Sholto William Douglas DSO Chief Constable of the Lothians and Peebles
- Ernest Arthur Eborall, Deputy Chief Inspector of Taxes, Inland Revenue
- John Rankine Finlayson JP Director of Manchester Chamber of Commerce since 1912
- Francis Russell Gosset, Deputy Sergeant at Arms, House of Commons
- Major John Harry Hebb OBE Royal Army Medical Corps (Retired), Director of Medical Services, Ministry of Pensions
- John Broughton Knight, Controller, Clearing Office (Enemy Debts), Board of Trade
- Cecil Howard Lander Director of Fuel Research, Department of Scientific and Industrial Research
- Samuel Lithgow JP Chairman of the St. Marylebone & Paddington Local Employment Committee
- Robert Findlay Longmuir, For political and public services in Ayr and the West of Scotland
- Thomas William Houldsworth McDougal JP Chairman, of the Lothians War Pensions Committee
- Robert Lee Matthews OBE Chief Constable of Leeds
- Alexander Millar, Secretary of the Antrim County Council
- Emily Alicia George
- Herbert Morrell DL For political and public services in Oxfordshire and Berkshire
- John Quirey, Vice President for Finance, London, Midland & Scottish Railway
- Councillor Gwilym Rowlands DL For political and public services in Rhondda, Glamorgan
- The Hon. Lockhart Matthew St. Clair CIE OBE Commandant, Metropolitan Special Constabulary
- William Marshall Simpson, Postmaster-Surveyor, Liverpool
- William Arthur Sturdy, Auditor, India Audit Office
- Nathan Thompson OBE ISO Inspector General of Waterguard, Board of Customs & Excise
- Henry Weatherill OBE FIA Assistant Comptroller, National Debt Office
- Duncan Randolph Wilson Secretary of the Industrial Fatigue Research Board, Medical Research Council
- Harry Egerton Wimperis OBE Director of Scientific Research, Air Ministry

British India

- Charles Maclvor Grant Ogilvie, Indian Civil Service, late Deputy Commissioner, Lahore
- Joseph Terence Owen Barnard CIE Deputy Commissioner, Burma, on special duty with the Triangle Expedition, Burma
- Raja Saiyid Ahmad Ali Khan Alvi MBE of Salempur, United Provinces
- Pestonji Sorabji Kotwal, Second Additional Judicial Commissioner, Central Provinces
- Percy Albert Cory OBE Honorary Treasurer of the Lady Minto's Indian Nursing Association, Home Branch

Diplomatic Service and Overseas List

- Arthur Douglas Deane Butcher, Director of the Hydraulic Section, Egyptian Irrigation Department
- Charles Fortescue Garstin, His Majesty's Consul at Shanghai
- Colonel William Fanshawe Loudon Gordon, late Commandant of the Shanghai Volunteer Corps
- James Henderson, President of the British Chamber of Commerce in Italy
- Penrhyn Grant Jones, His Majesty's Consul at Harbin
- Major Cecil Stephen Northcote, Governor of the Nuba Mountains Province, Sudan
- Major Mervyn James Wheatley OBE Governor of Bahr-el-Ghazal Province, Sudan

Dominions

- Shirley Eales OBE Assistant Imperial Secretary, South African High Commission
- Clifford Henderson Hay CMG MVO Under-Secretary and Permanent Head of the Premier's Department, State of New South-Wales
- Robert Noble Jones, Chief Judge of the Native Land Court and Under-Secretary for Native Affairs, Dominion of New Zealand
- George Shaw Knowles OBE Assistant Secretary and Assistant Parliamentary Draftsman, Attorney-General's Department, Commonwealth of Australia
- Mary McLean, lately Principal of Wellington Girls' College, Dominion of New Zealand
- Henry John Sheehan, Assistant Secretary, Treasury, Commonwealth of Australia
- Frank Stratum Assistant Secretary, Prime Minister's Department, Commonwealth of Australia

Colonies, Protectorates, etc.

- Edward William Baynes OBE Colonial Secretary, Leeward Islands
- William Douglas Davis Bowden, Commissioner of the Central Province, Sierra Leone
- Walter Andrew Bowring, Treasurer, Gibraltar
- Harold Kennard Holmes, Crown Solicitor, Hong Kong. For services for the welfare of the troops in Hong Kong
- Humphrey Trice Martin, Commissioner for Local Government, Lands and Settlement, Kenya
- Joseph Antoine Maurice Martin. Elected Member of the Council of Government, Mauritius. For public services.
- Mathew Alexander Murphy MICE Director of Public Works, Trinidad
- Lieutenant-Colonel John Edward Strathearn OBE Warden of the Hospital of the Order of Saint John of Jerusalem in Palestine
- Robert Walter Taylor OBE Treasurer, Tanganyika Territory
- George John Frederick Tomlinson, lately Assistant Secretary for Native Affairs, Nigeria

==== Officer of the Order of the British Empire (OBE) ====
===== Military Division =====
Royal Navy

- Paymaster Captain Bernard William Gillhespie Cook (retired)
- Commander John Fenwick Hutchings DSO
- Lieutenant Commander Denys Arthur Henderson
- Engineer Commander Bertram Harvey
- Surgeon Commander Bryan Pickering Pick
- Commander Ernest William Swan VD RNVR

Army

- Lieutenant-Colonel Herbert Charles Agnew, Royal Engineers
- Lieutenant-Colonel and Brevet Colonel Harold Wood Barker TD late 6th Battalion The West Yorkshire Regiment (The Prince of Wales's Own), Territorial Army
- Major Robert Boal DSO Royal Engineers (Indian Army), Commanding Royal Engineer; 2nd Class, Loralai, India
- Major Edward Bertie Hartley Berwick TD Bossall School Contingent, Officers Training Corps
- Inspector of Works and Major John Barker Bradshaw AMInstCE Staff for Royal Engineer Services
- Quartermaster and Captain George Brown, 3rd Battalion City of London Regiment (The Royal Fusiliers); Territorial Army
- Major Valentine Rodolphe Burkhardt DSO Royal Artillery
- Captain Esmond Humphrey Miller Clifford MC Royal Engineers, Second British Commissioner, Jubaland Boundary Commission
- Major Leslie Charles Bertram Deed DSO Royal Engineers, Military Engineering Services, India
- Quartermaster and Lieutenant-Colonel Arthur Edward Everingham DSO Retired pay, Recruiting Staff, Scottish Command
- Quartermaster and Captain James Henry William Ford TD The Nottinghamshire Yeomanry (Sherwood Rangers), Territorial Army
- Captain Alec Frankland, 1st/4th Bombay Grenadiers, Indian Army, General Staff Officer, 3rd Grade, General Staff Branch, Army Headquarters, India
- Major James Hebblethwaite Martin Frobisher Royal Army Medical Corps
- Lieutenant-Colonel John Maxwell Gillatt DSO Regular Army Besecve of Officers, The Royal Scots (The Royal Regiment), lately Commanding 4th Battalion Iraq Levies
- Captain William Angel1 Goddard, The Dorsetshire Regiment, late Assistant Superintendent, Physical Training, Aldershot Command
- Lieutenant-Colonel Huntly Fleetwood Gordon, Indian Army, Army Remount Department, India
- Lieutenant-Colonel Ernest William Grant, Staff Paymaster, Royal Army Pay Corps
- Lieutenant-Colonel Humphrey Francis Humphreys MC 143rd Field Ambulance, Royal Army Medical Corps, Territorial Army
- Captain Arthur Gwynne Kay, Royal Tank-Corps, Assistant Instructor, Tank Driving and Maintenance School, Headquarters Central Schools, Wool
- Major Chilton Gresham Lewis, Royal Engineers, Superintendent, Indian Survey Department, attached to the Turco-Iraq, Frontier-Delimitation Commission
- Lieutenant-Colonel Ernest Achey Loftus, 6th Battalion, The Essex Regiment, Territorial Army
- Captain Ronald Tracy Alexander McDonald, Staff Corps, Australian Military Forces
- Captain William Douglas McGregor, 1st King George's Own Gurkha Bines, Indian Army, attached B Corps Signals
- Matron Lilian Emily Mackay RRC Queen Alexandra's Imperial Military Nursing Service
- Major Albert Edward Macrae MIMechE Royal Artillery, lately Attached Royal Gun and Carriage Factories, Woolwich Royal Arsenal
- Lieutenant-Colonel Otho Hugh Chartres Molony, Supernumerary List, Indian Army
- Commissary and Major Patrick Moore, Indian Army Ordnance Corps
- Commissary and Major Thomas Henry Naughton MBE Military Engineering Services, Indian Army
- Captain Frederick William Ollis, The Gloucestershire Regiment, Chief Instructor, Chemical Warfare School, Porton
- Lieutenant-Colonel Ernest Parbury, Indian Army Ordnance Corps, Inspector of Ammunition, Kirkee, India
- Captain Andrew Peffers, The Cameronians (Scottish Bines), Staff Captain 56th (1st London) Division, Territorial Army
- Major George Scott Nelson-Scott, 5th/6th (Renfrewshire) Battalion The Argyll and Sutherland Highlanders (Princess Louise's), Territorial Army
- Lieutenant Evelyn Philip Servallis Shirley, The Royal Irish Fusiliers (Princess Victoria's), late Captain, Somaliland Camel Corps, The King's African Rifles
- Major Douglas Gordon Smith, Commanding 1st Battalion Trinidad Light Infantry Volunteers
- Quartermaster and Captain Alfred Summersell, Extra Regimentally employed List, Chief Clerk, Headquarters, Eastern Command
- Major James Parry Swettenham VD Commanding Selangor Volunteer Corps, Federated Malay States
- Captain Douglas Rhys Thomas MC The Bedfordshire and Hertfordshire Regiment, Adjutant 1st Battalion
- Lieutenant-Colonel Henry Tudsbery Tudsbery MC MInstCE Essex Group, Anti-Aircraft Searchlight Companies, Royal Engineers, Territorial Army
- Major Gordon Wilson MC Royal Army Medical Corps
- Captain Bramwell Henry Withers, The Loyal Regiment (North Lancashire), attached Sudan Defence Force

Royal Air Force

- Squadron Leader Alan FitzRoy Somerset-Leeke
- Christine Cameron RRC Matron, Princess Mary's Royal Air Force Nursing Service
- The Reverend Maurice Henry Edwards Chaplain, Royal Air Force

===== Civil Division =====
- Alfred John Adams. For political and public services in Hertfordshire.
- Tom Wood Ainge. For political services.
- Captain George Frederick Alexander, General Secretary, Irish Sailors and Soldiers Land Trust
- Milgitha Lettice Alcock, Clerk to His Majesty's Private Secretary
- William Gerald Allen, Principal, Home Office
- Frederick Nathaniel Bath, Accountant, Ministry of Health
- Cyril Bavin, General Secretary, Migration Department of the National Councils of the YMCA of Great Britain and Ireland
- Leslie Cecil Blackmore Bowker MC Chief Clerk to the Law Officers of the Crown
- Clifford Henry Boyd, Principal, Board of Trade
- John Carmichael, Chief Constable of Dundee
- The Venerable Archdeacon Harry William Carpenter Archdeacon of Sarum. For many years service on behalf of the troops quartered on Salisbury Plain.
- Lieutenant-Colonel Clarence Horatio Chapell, Examiner, Technical Examination Branch, War Office
- Johanna Margaret Clay RRC Principal Matron for Scotland, Ministry of Pensions
- Leonora Cohen JP Chairman of the Women's Sub-Committee of the Leeds Local Employment Committee
- Cecil Wharton Collard MBE Commander, Metropolitan Special Constabulary
- Emily Jane Connor DL For public services in Ulster.
- Minna Galbraith Cowan, For political and public services in Edinburgh.
- Herbert William Crapp, Principal Clerk, Board of Inland Revenue
- Ernest Lionel Victor Crocker, Senior Principal Clerk, Ministry of Pensions
- James Crowther, Principal, Halifax Technical College
- Elizabeth Harley Cunningham. For public services in the Isle of Man.
- Daniel Nicol Dunlop, Director, British Electrical & Allied Manufacturers Association
- Sydney George Edridge. For many years Chairman of the National Association of Probation Officers
- Robert Elrick, Deputy Accountant General, Board of Customs & Excise
- Percy Alexander Francis MBE Poultry Commissioner, Ministry of Agriculture and Fisheries
- William Joseph Gannon, His Majesty's Divisional Inspector of Schools, Board of Education
- Evelyn Margaret Garner, Principal of Women's Staff, Board of Inland Revenue
- Christopher Hodson, Chief Constable of Blackburn
- Councillor Adam Horrocks Hollingworth DL For political and public services in Middleton, Lancashire
- Surgeon Commander Walter Kempson Hopkins RN (retired), Medical Officer, Board of Customs and Excise
- Stamford Hutton MBE JP Chairman of the Gloucestershire War Pensions Committee
- Charles Joseph Jeffries, Principal, Colonial Office
- Robert Pierce Jones, Deputy Controller, Wales Division, Ministry of Labour
- Anthony Edward Killick Superintending Valuer, Board of Inland Revenue
- John Kirkland FRIBA Architect, Board of Control
- Octavius Lance MBE Director of Expense Accounts, Admiralty
- Tennyson John David Large, late Collector of Customs and Excise, Belfast
- Alexander Leighton JP Rector, Morgan Academy, Dundee
- Commander Frederick George Loring RN (Retired) Inspector of Wireless Telegraphy, Post Office
- Constance Mary Marwood, Superintendent, Money Order Department, Post Office
- John Masterton MBE His Majesty's Divisional Inspector of Mines, Mines Department
- Joseph Meller, For many years Chairman of the House Committee, Queen's Hospital for Children, Hackney Road
- Teresa Merz DL For services in connection with the Newcastle Hostel for training boys for Oversea Settlement
- Alice Eva Marion Milnes, Secretary of the League of Mercy
- Henry Oliver Minty Principal Examiner, Patent Office, Board of Trade
- Lieutenant-Colonel Eric Murray, Secretary, British Empire League
- Albert Robert Myers ARIBA Senior Architect, H.M. Office of Works
- Ellis Owen, Official Receiver in Bankruptcy, Cardiff
- Ivor Llewelyn Phillips, Secretary, Welsh Association of Insurance Committees
- Walter Bawden Pindar, Clerk to the Rural District Council of Hunslet
- Harry Pratt, For political services.
- George Ritchie Rice, Financial Adviser and Local Auditor with the Shanghai Defence Force
- Edward Salmon, Editor of the Journal of the Royal Colonial Institute
- Milly Gertrude Harry Selby, Chairman of the Bromley Division Conservative Women's Association. For political and public services in Kent.
- John Robert Sivess MICE Deputy Civil Engineer-in-Chief, Admiralty
- Reginald Stagg, Headquarters Supervisor of Home Areas, Navy, Army and Air Force Institutes
- Henry Claude Taylor, Assistant Director in the Exhibitions Division of the Department of Overseas Trade
- Frederick John Taylor JP MIMechE Chairman, Neath Local Employment Committee
- Harold Victor Taylor MBE ARCS Horticultural Commissioner, Ministry of Agriculture and Fisheries
- Samuel Robert Todd, Chief Inspector, Trade Boards Division, Ministry of Labour
- Major William Sansome Tucker Director of Acoustics at the Air Defence Experimental Establishment, War Office
- Captain Herbert Reginald Vyvyan, Chief Constable of Devon
- Frederick Porter Wensley MBE Chief-Constable of the Metropolitan Criminal Investigation Department
- Percy John Wheeldon, Principal, Department of Scientific and Industrial Research
- Richard Trefor Williams MBE Chief Insurance Inspector, Welsh Board of Health
- William Williams His Majesty's Divisional Inspector of Schools, Board of Education
- Robert Humphrey Wilson, Clerk to the Belfast Board of Guardians
- Ronald McKinnon Wood MBE Principal Scientific Officer, Royal Aircraft Establishment, Farnborough
- George Henry Wright FCIS Secretary of the Birmingham Chamber of Commerce

British India

- M. R. Ry. Madhavan Nambiar Arachil Candeth Avargal, Indian Educational Service, Deputy Director of Public Instruction, Madras
- Major Frank Cook, Engineer, Nabha State
- Robert Foulkes, Member of the Madras Legislative Council, President, District Board, Madura
- Khan Bahadur Chaudhri Fazal Ali MBE Member of the Punjab Legislative Council, Chairman, District Board, Gujrat
- Raj Bahadur Doctor Kishori Lai Chaudhri MBE Assistant Director of Public Health, United Provinces
- Leon Williamson Amps AMICE Executive Engineer in charge of the construction of the British Legation Buildings at Kabul
- Khan Bahadur Chaudhri Rashicl-ud-Din Ashraf, Taluqdar of Karkha, Bara Banki District, United Provinces
- Terence Purves Dewar, Assistant Superintendent in charge of the Naga Hills Expedition, Burma
- Percy Mitchell Russell Leonard, Assistant Superintendent, on duty with the Triangle Expedition, Burma
- Joseph McGregor Cheers MBE Officer Supervisor, General Staff Branch, Army Headquarters
- George Campbell Devon, State Engineer, Kotah, Rajputana
- Matilda McGann, Mysore
- Mangaldas Vijbhukhandas Mehta, Medical Practitioner, Bombay

Diplomatic Service and Overseas List

- Mary Ethel Winifred, Lady Barton. In recognition of valuable services for the welfare of the Shanghai Defence Force.
- James Godfrey Lyon Brown For services in connection with the Emergency Volunteer Corps at Hankow
- Alphonse Busuttil. For valuable services to British interests in Tunis
- George Rammell Footner, Director of the Omdunnan Civil Hospital
- The Reverend Robert Frew, Chaplain at The Hague
- Cyril Havercroft, Deputy-General Manager, Sudan Government Railways and Steamers
- John Colville Hutchison, Acting British Vice-Consul at Hankow
- Lieutenant-Colonel Malcolm Hunter Logan, Shanghai Defence Force
- Archibald Colin Christian Deleto MacDonald, Director of the Equipment and Finance Department of the Egyptian Ministry of Interior
- Norman Lush Sparke In recognition of services in connection with the Shanghai Defence Force
- George Ronald Storrar MBE Chief Engineer, Sudan Government Railways

Dominions

- William Herbert Ifould, Principal Librarian and Secretary, Public Library, State of New South Wales
- Henry Charles Weatherilt, Member of the European Advisory Council in the Bechuanaland Protectorate
- Effie Io Wilkinson. For public services in the Commonwealth of Australia.

Colonies, Protectorates, etc.

- Percy William Duncombe Armbrister, lately Receiver General and Treasurer, Bahama Islands
- William Frederick Becker, Unofficial Member of the Legislative Council of Nigeria
- Professor Albert Victor Bernard MBE Medical Officer of Health, Malta
- Harold Frank Birchal, Construction Engineer, Kenya and Uganda Railways
- The Venerable George Robert Blackledge, Archdeacon of Uganda
- Robert Sutherland Cooke, Inspector-General, Ministry of Auqaf and Honorary Director of Antiquities, Iraq
- Sydney Cuthbert, Unofficial Member of the Executive Council, British Honduras
- Thomas Robert Cutler, Collector of Customs, Trinidad
- Herbert George Dempster, Resident Engineer, Uganda Extension, Kenya and Uganda Railways
- Cecil Moore Dobbs, Provincial Commissioner, Kenya
- Duncan Elliott, lately Senior Executive Engineer, Public Works Department, Nigeria
- Captain Bertram Alexander Francis, Collector of Customs and Harbour Master, Mauritius
- Edward Butler Home, Provincial Commissioner, Kenya
- William Hamilton Lee-Warner, lately District Officer, Federated Malay States
- Emma Pauline Manasseh. For charitable services in the Straits Settlements
- Arthur Stephen Mavrogordato, Commandant Department of Police and Prisons, Palestine
- The Reverend Canon Frank Darvall Newham, Director of Education, Cyprus
- Clifford Henry Fitzherbert Plowman, British Consul at Harar, Abyssinia. For services to the Somaliland Protectorate.
- Edward Reginald Sawer, Director of the Department of Agriculture, Palestine
- Nanayakkarage Don Stephen Silva, Justice of the Peace; for public and charitable services, Island of Ceylon
- Alice Sproule. For charitable services in the Straits Settlements.
- King'sley Willans Stead, Director of Customs, Excise and Trade, Palestine
- Robert Sutherland MBE For services for the welfare of the troops in Hong Kong
- Frank Edward Talland, Unofficial Member of the Legislative Council of the Gold Coast
- Tso Shin-wan. For public services, Hong Kong.
- Bertram Tom Watts, Director of Land Registration and Surveys, Cyprus
- Major William Clement Francis Allan Wilson, Administrative Inspector, Ministry of Interior, Iraq
- John Woodman, lately President, Court of First Instance, Iraq

Honorary Officers

- Tahsin Beg Qadri, Rais al Awul, Aide-de-Camp to H.M. the King of Iraq

==== Member of the Order of the British Empire (MBE) ====
===== Military Division =====
Royal Navy

- Engineer Lieutenant Commander Alfred Dore Slatter
- Lieutenant Commander Instructor in Cookery Frank Pharoah
- Telegraphist Lieutenant Alonzo Boniface (retired)
- Commissioned Master at Arms Robert Henry Johnson
- Headmaster John Alfred Rowe
- Chief Skipper Peter Yorston DSC RNR Ordnance
- Lieutenant-Commander George Prideaux RAN

Army

- Deputy Commissary and Captain Arthur Ambrose, Superintendent, Adjutant General's Branch, Army Headquarters, India
- Captain Robert James Appleby, 2nd Battalion, The Durham Light Infantry
- Sergeant-Major Instructor Frank Barber, Royal Artillery, School of Artillery, Larkhill
- Mechanist Quartermaster-Sergeant Clifford Barton, Royal Army Service Corps, attached Sudan Defence Force
- First Class Staff Sergeant-Major John Thomas Bevvs, Royal Army Service Corps, Department of the Quartermaster-General to the Forces, War Office
- Lieutenant Ashley Raymond Bond, 2nd Battalion, The Durham Light Infantry
- Conductor George Joseph Flowerdew Brown, Indian Unattached List, Military Engineering Services, Indian Army
- Regimental Sergeant-Major Henry Nichol Close, The Royal Scots Greys (2nd Dragoons)
- Captain Vivian Dykes, Royal Engineers, Staff Captain Department of the Quartermaster-General to the Forces, War Office
- Quartermaster and Captain Charles Edward Easterbrook, Royal Engineers
- Battery Sergeant-Major Ernest Francis Ferraro, Hampshire Heavy Brigade, Royal Artillery, Territorial Army
- Regimental Quartermaster Sergeant Henry Howard Fletcher, Supernumerary List, Coldstream Guards, attached Royal Military College, Sandhurst
- Superintending Clerk Herbert Benjamin James Franklin, Royal Engineers, Department of the Chief of the Imperial General Staff, War Office
- First Class Assistant Surgeon Edward Henry Gillson, Indian Medical Department
- Lieutenant Alfred Percy Green, Royal Artillery
- Staff Sergeant-Major Christopher Henry Hanson, Royal Army Service Corps, Department of the Adjutant General to the Forces, War Office
- Risaldar Hari Singh, Indian Army Service Corps, Cavalry Brigade, Transport Company
- Deputy Commissary and Captain William Harrison, Indian Miscellaneous List, Superintendent, General Staff Branch, Army Headquarters, India
- Captain George Waddell Harvey, Forth Heavy Brigade, Royal Artillery, Territorial Army
- Quartermaster and Captain Thomas Webster Hill, 5th Battalion The Loyal Regiment (North Lancashire), Territorial Army
- Lieutenant Reginald Thomas Hockey TD 96th (Royal Devon Yeomanry) Field Brigade, Royal Artillery, Territorial Army
- Lieutenant Gilbert Daly Holmes, Royal Artillery, attached Somaliland Camel Corps, The King's African Rifles, lately attached 3rd (Kenya) Battalion The King's African Rifles and Officer Commanding Escort, Jubaland Boundary Commission
- Captain Frederick Ralph Honeyball, 4th/10th Baluch Regiment, Indian Army
- Lieutenant Henry Richard Hopking, The Suffolk Regiment, Adjutant 2nd Battalion
- Lieutenant Harry Alfred Adrian Howell, The Middlesex Regiment (Duke of Cambridge's Own), Local Captain, Assistant Staff Officer to the Local Forces, Straits Settlements, Malaya
- Ordnance Executive Officer 2nd Class and Captain George Ernest Victor Howe's, Royal Army Ordnance Corps
- Company Sergeant-Major Albert Murray Humphreys MM 26th (London) Anti-Aircraft Battalion (London Electrical Engineers) Royal Engineers, Territorial Army
- Acting Sergeant-Major Leslie Herbert Ives, Royal Army Medical Corps, attached 48th (South Midland) Divisional Medical Services
- Sergeant-Major Frederick John Lionel Jeffery, Indian Unattached List, Embarkation Sergeant-Major, Burma
- Lieutenant Alfred Douglas Murray Lewis, The Royal Welsh Fusiliers, temporary Captain Somaliland Camel Corps, The King's African Rifles
- Instructor John Patrick Loughlin, Army Educational Corps
- Quartermaster Sergeant-Instructor John George Maughan, Royal Tank Corps
- Regimental Sergeant-Major Thomas William Milner, 1st Battalion The Duke of Wellington's Regiment (West Riding)
- Company Sergeant-Major (Acting Regimental Sergeant-Major) George Mitchell DCM 5th Battalion The Green Howards (Alexandra, Princess of Wales's Own Yorkshire Regiment), Territorial Army
- Quartermaster and Captain Frank Moore, Royal Army Service Corps
- Regimental Sergeant-Major William Murray DCM 2nd Battalion Scots Guards
- Lieutenant Harry Norman Newey, Army Educational Corps, late Instructor, Army School of Education, Belgaum, India
- Regimental Sergeant-Major Victor Charles Northover, Devonshire (Fortress) Royal Engineers, Territorial Army
- Company Sergeant-Major Thomas Coulthard O'Brien DCM Royal Engineers, Chemical Warfare School, Porton
- Quartermaster Sergeant-Instructor Thomas William Pedley, Royal Engineers, Survey School, School of Military Engineering, Chatham
- Subadar-Major Piran Ditta DCM late Hong Kong Singapore Brigade, Royal Artillery
- Commissary and Major Harry Pluck, Indian Miscellaneous List, Officer Supervisor, Master-General of Supply Branch, Army Headquarters, India
- Quartermaster and Lieutenant Frederick Preston, Corps of Military Police
- Quartermaster and Captain John Robinson, 8th Battalion The Lancashire Fusiliers, Territorial Army
- Assistant Commissary and Lieutenant Felix Deeble Rogers, Indian Miscellaneous List, Chief Clerk, Burma District
- Battery Sergeant-Major Charles Lewis Ryan, 66th (South Midland) Field Brigade Royal Artillery, Territorial Army
- Staff Quartermaster-Sergeant Aubrey Oswald Sibbald, Royal Army Service Corps
- Garrison Sergeant-Major Henry Arthur Singleton, Garrison Staff, Aldershot
- Regimental Sergeant Major William Stevenson DCM MM 1st Battalion Welsh Guards
- Regimental Sergeant-Major Alfred Sutherland, Depot, Royal Tank Corps
- Surveyor of Works and Lieutenant Stanley James Templeton, Royal Engineers
- Battery Sergeant-Major Daniel Vigar, 51st (Westmorland and Cumberland) Field Brigade, Royal Artillery, Territorial Army
- Assistant Commissary and Lieutenant Alexander Vingoe, Indian Corps of Clerks
- Company Sergeant-Major Alfred Frederick Warwick, 24th (Derbyshire Yeomany) Armoured Car Company, Royal Tank Corps, Territorial Army
- Commissary and Major Albert Waters, Indian Army Service Corps
- Battery Sergeant Major Charles William Edward Workman DCM MM Hampshire Heavy Brigade, Royal Artillery, Territorial Army
- Sergeant-Major Instructor Arthur Worsley DCM retired pension, late Army Physical Training Staff, Aldershot

Royal Air Force

- Flight Lieutenant Hugh Nelson
- Sergeant Major 1st Class Reginald Arthur Howes
- Sergeant Major 2nd Class Herbert William Smith

Honorary Member

- Rab Khaila David D'Mar Shimun, Aide-de-Camp to the Commandant, Iraq Levies

===== Civil Division =====
- Charles Herbert Benson Abbot, Accountant Cashier, France, Imperial War Graves Commission
- John Frederick Anstead, Staff Clerk, War Office
- Benjamin George Arthur, Secretary of the National Leather Goods and Saddlery Manufacturers Association
- Gladys Bertha Attwood, Chief Superintendent of Typists, Mines Department
- Charles McKenzie Bell, Chief Superintendent, Durham Constabulary
- William Robert Bell JP Clerk of the Newry Board of Guardians and of the Newry Rural District Councils
- Paymaster Commander Thomas Robert Best RD RNR Chief Superintendent, N.E. Coast District Mercantile Marine Office, Board of Trade
- Walter Robert Black Assistant Principal, Ministry of Agriculture and Fisheries
- Ursula Henrietta Blackwood, Superintendent of Translators, War Office
- George Herbert Bowler, Chief Area Officer, Ministry of Pensions
- Agnes Bowley, Late Head Mistress of Medway Street Infants Department, Leicester
- John David Brown, Traffic Accountant, Pacific Cable Board
- William Alfred Bunner, Inspector of Stamping, Somerset House
- James Lawther Clark, Clerk of the Antrim Board of Guardians and Rural District Council
- Letitia Sarah Clark RRC Matron, Whippa Cross Hospital
- Arthur Markland Clegg, Staff Officer, Mines Department
- James Craig, Superintendent and Deputy Chief Constable, Westlothian
- Francis Hoyland Crapper, Superintendent, Lancashire Constabulary. For devoted and meritorious police service particularly in connection with the floods at Fleetwood in October, 1927
- William Irwin Cunningham, Town Clerk of Portrush Urban District Council
- Cornelius Curran, Senior Staff Officer, Statistical Office, Board of Customs and Excise
- James Wright Dick, Acting First Class Clerk, Ministry of Health
- Edwin Page, Examiner of Dockyard Work, Engineer-in-Chief s Department, Admiralty
- James Donald Feely. Higher Executive Officer, Ministry of Pensions
- Walter Cecil Fenwick, Contract Officer, Air Ministry
- Robert Chesney Finney, First Class Examiner in the Companies (Winding-up) Department, Board of Trade
- Thomas Ogle Freeman (senior), Collector of Taxes, Newcastle upon Tyne
- Leonard David Gibbs, Clerk, Records Department, London, Imperial War Graves Commission
- Walter Gordon, Superintendent, Wigan Borough Police
- Rosa Forsyth Grant, Masseuse, Military Hospital, Edinburgh. For voluntary services.
- Albert Griffiths, Clerk to the Bridgend and Cowbridge Board of Guardians
- Robert William Hanna, Secretary of the British National Committee of the International Chamber of Commerce
- Robert Harper, Chairman of the Medway Boroughs, Gravesend and District War Pensions Committee
- Amy Louise Hatch, Higher Clerical Officer (Divisional Superintendent), Ministry of Pensions
- William Henderson, Accountant, Board of Customs and Excise
- Eliza Mary George Henry. Retired teacher. For services to education in Banffshire and the Western Isles
- Edith Harriet Herbert, Superintendent of Royal College of St. Katharine, Poplar
- Dorothy Aileen Humphrey, Assistant Secretary to the Permanent Under Secretary of State, Foreign Office
- George Thomas Hyden JP Chairman of the Consett, Blaydon and District War Pensions Committee
- Jean Kennedy Irvine, Superintendent, South-Eastern Pricing Bureau. For meritorious service in connection with the National Health Insurance Scheme
- Charlotte Keeling JP Member of the Westminster, Kensington and Chelsea War Pensions Committee
- Alfred William Kingsland, Treasurer and Accountant to the Borough of Ramsgate
- George Thomas Knight, Superintendent and Deputy Chief Constable, Hertfordshire Constabulary
- Richard Knox, Superintendent, Hampshire Constabulary
- Robert Cecil Last, Staff Officer, Board of Inland Revenue
- Janet Coghill Swanson Luke. For political and public services in Lanarkshire.
- The Reverend Joseph McKenna. For services during the floods at Fleetwood in October 1927
- Alexander Mackenzie, Superintendent and Deputy Chief Constable, Argyllshire
- Albert McLean, Organising Master, Carlton Street Senior Evening Institute, Bradford
- Councillor Patrick McNicholas. For services during the floods at Fleetwood in October 1927
- Ernest William Moat, Superintendent, Middlesex Deeds and Land Charges Department, Land Registry
- John William Monson, Staff Officer, Board of Inland Revenue
- Katharine Moore, Confidential Shorthand Typist to the Secretary of State, and Assistant to the Private Secretary, India Office
- John Reginald Nelson, Staff Clerk, War Office
- William Hastings Nichols, Superintending Clerk, Accountant General's Department, Admiralty
- William Ernest Noall, Staff Officer, Dominions Office
- Rosina Palmer JP Member of the Worcester, Kidderminster and District War Pensions Committee
- William George Paramour, Superintendent, Kent Constabulary
- George Henry Paxon, Accountant, Finance Department, Ministry of Labour
- Kate Annie Popert, Accountant, Finance Department, Ministry of Labour
- Grace Alice Rees, Manager, Special Employment Exchange for Women, Girls and Boys, Great Marlborough Street
- Alfred James Richards, Chief Superintendent, Staffordshire Constabulary
- William Rowbotham, Superintending Clerk, Pensions Department, Ministry of Health
- George Ernest Russell, Head Master, Battle Council Mixed Department, Reading
- Wilfred George Sanders, Constructor, Department of the Director of Naval Construction, Admiralty
- John Thomas Savill, formerly Head Master of Bladon School, Oxfordshire
- Olive Letitia Scurlock, Chief Superintendent of Typists, Board of Trade
- Arthur Henry Shepherd, Head of Section, Superintendent of Lines Department, Great Western Railway
- Charles Henry Simonds, Clerk to the Recorder of Bradford
- Ernest Smith, Higher Clerical Officer, Ministry of Health
- Lieutenant-Colonel Frederick William Smith DSO DCM Superintendent, Glamorgan Constabulary
- Henry Watson Stockman, First-Class Clerk, Ministry of Health
- Frederick Carey Stringer, Senior Staff Clerk, War Office
- Robert William Strugnell, Assistant Civil Engineer, Works and Buildings Department, Air Ministry
- John Taft, Governor of H.M. Borstal Institution, Feltham, Middlesex
- Alfred Edmund Taylor, Superintendent, Shropshire Constabulary
- Harry Robert Tooley, Acting Expense Accounts Officer, Admiralty
- Wallace John Turl, Higher Clerical Officer, Ministry of Health
- Stanley William Vaughan, Details Superintendent Clerk, Motor Transport, France and Belgium, Imperial War Graves Commission
- Arthur Edward Walker, Senior Executive Officer, Secretaries Office, Board of Customs and Excise
- Edmund Seller Wiggins, Higher Clerical Officer, Ministry of Health
- Mabel Agnes Wilde, Honorary Secretary of the Tunbridge Wells Committee of the Kent Association for Empire Settlement
- Barbara Edith Barber Williams. For charitable services in Southport
- Samuel John Young, Manager, Shoreditch Employment Exchange, Ministry of Labour

British India

- Francis Woodman-Wilson JP Executive Electrical Engineer, and Electrical Inspector to Government, Bombay
- William Henry King, Assistant Engineer, Posts and Telegraphs Service
- Edwin Harold Brandon, Assistant Secretary, Home Department of the Government of India
- William Norman Richardson JP Bombay Civil Service, Deputy Collector and City Magistrate, Karachi
- Arthur Matthews, Officer Supervisor, Adjutant-General's Branch, Army Headquarters
- Rao Bahadur Waman Ganesh Rale, retired Deputy Collector, Bombay
- Mark William Smith, Superintendent, Foreign and Political Department, Government of India
- James Henry Green, Superintendent, Department of Education, Health and Lands, Government of India
- Herbert Cyrill Marshall Upshon, Jailor, Presidency Jail, Calcutta
- Captain Frank Ernest Hitchin, Superintendent, Borstal School, Tanjore, Madras
- Henry Kelegher Penrose, Secretary, Municipal Committee and District Board, Peshawar
- Herbert Matthew Cameron Harris, Head Master, Government High School, Ajmer, Rajputana
- William Baker Cairns, Quarry and Stoneyard Officer, Delhi
- Alfred William Conolly, Works Manager (Production), Rifle Factory, Ishapore
- Ruth Young, Personal Assistant to the Chief Medical Officer, Women's Medical Service, and the Secretary of the Funds under the Presidency of Her Excellency the Lady Irwin
- Pandit Ram Nath, Principal, Pandit Baij Nath High School, Amritsar
- Khan Sahib Ardeshir Ruttonji Mehta, Senior Hospital Storekeeper, British Military Hospital, Quetta

Diplomatic Service and Overseas List

- Harry James Archibald, Editor and Proprietor of the Central China Post
- Joseph William Caruana, British Pro-Consul at Port Said
- Robert Diacono, President of the Maltese Community in Cairo
- James Lawrie Duncan, Master of Works, Khartoum Province
- Ernest Edwin Gabbetis, Superintendent of Works, Public Works Department, Sudan Government
- Martha Isabel Garvice, Senior Lady Medical Officer, Egyptian Ministry of Education
- The Reverend Bertie James Harper, Khartoum
- Meta Hunt, Social and Educational Worker, Khartoum
- Thomas Cornelius Sargent, British Vice-Consul at Santiago
- Frank Wicker, Secretary of the Hertford British Hospital in Paris

Dominions

- Louisa Adlam, lately Matron-in-Chief of the Southern Rhodesia Nursing Service

Colonies, Protectorates, etc.

- Captain Frederick Stanworth Adey. For services for the welfare of the troops in Hong Kong.
- Mabel Winifred Mary Alabaster. For services for the welfare of the troops in Hong Kong.
- Edward Bird, Chief Clerk in the Governor's Office, Kenya
- Leila Evelyn de Lisle Bowen, Honorary Secretary of the Naval Welfare League, Barbados. For services in providing entertainment and hospitality for men of H.M. Ships.
- James Frederick Corson Assistant Bacteriologist, Medical and Sanitary Department, Tanganyika Territory
- Francis Lionel Daniel, Justice of the Peace and Unofficial Police Magistrate, Colombo, Ceylon
- John Adolphus Songo Davies, Unofficial Member of the Legislative Council, Sierra Leone
- Muriel Hanschell, President of the Naval Welfare League, Barbados. For services in providing entertainment and hospitality for men of H.M. Ships.
- Commander Fred Mason Jenkins, Marine Superintendent, Kenya and Uganda Railways
- George Maclean Sleeping Sickness Officer, Medical and Sanitary Department, Tanganyika Territory
- Nevile Southcote Mansergh, Commissioner of Police, Gold Coast
- Muriel Edith Miskin, Principal of the Deaf and Blind School at Mount Lavinia, near Colombo, Ceylon
- Augustus Rawle Parkinson, Headmaster of the Wesley Hall Elementary School, Barbados
- Alice Christabel Remington. For services for the welfare of the troops in Hong Kong.
- John Goodwin Roberts, Public School Teacher in the Out-islands, Bahama Islands
- Lois Mary Roberts, Matron of the Public Hospital, Belize, British Honduras
- Beatrice Russell-Brown. For services for the welfare of the troops in Hong Kong.
- Raymond Gustave Sargeant, Port Captain, Kenya
- Charles Henry Joseph Sheppard, Inspecting Officer of Police, Iraq
- James Godfrey Tetteh O'Baka Torto, Treasury Assistant, Nigeria
- Emily Mary Tull. For services in connection with the Baby Welfare Movement in Grenada, Windward Islands
- Agnes Catherine Wolfe. For services for the welfare of the troops in Hong Kong.

Honorary Members

- Nejib Effendi Bawarshi, Assistant District Officer, Palestine
- Abdel Baszak Effendi Kleibo, Assistant District Officer, Palestine
- Yeshua Shami Medical Officer, Department of Health, Palestine

=== Members of the Order of the Companions of Honour (CH) ===
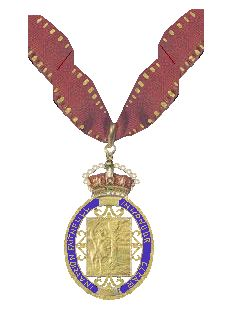
The riband and badge of the "Companions of Honour"

- Professor John Scott Haldane Director of the Mining Research Laboratory of Birmingham University. For Scientific work in connection with industrial disease.

=== Kaisar-i-Hind Medal ===
First Class

- Winifred May, Lady Wilson, Bombay
- Rai Bahadur Sir Bipin Krishna Bose KCIE Vice-Chancellor, Nagpur University, Central Provinces
- Iris Goodeve Brayne, Gurgaon, Punjab
- Christian Frederik Frimodt-Møller, Medical Superintendent, Union Mission Tuberculosis Sanatorium, Madanapaller Chittoor District, Madras
- Ada Lee, Superintendent, Lee Memorial Mission, Calcutta
- Father Alphonse Fargeton, Superintendent, Rangoon Leper Asylum, Burma
- Annie Caroline Smith, in charge of the Zenana Hospital of the Church of Scotland Mission, Gujrat
- Robert Johnston Ashton Kachwa, Mirzapur District, United Provinces

=== British Empire Medal (BEM) ===
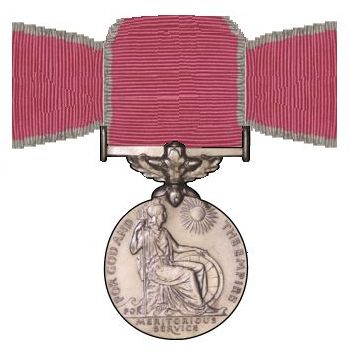
The British Empire Medal for meritorious service

==== Military Division ====
For Meritorious Service

- Corporal Kashi Mohanied, 3rd Battalion, The King's African Rifles

==== Civil Division ====
For Meritorious Service

- John Berry, Superintendent of Messengers, and Office Keeper
- John Britch, Constable, Lancashire Constabulary
- Thomas Jones, Fireman, Lytham St. Annes Fire Brigade
- Charles Adolphus Judd, Superintendent of Messengers in the office of the Parliamentary Secretary to the Treasury
- Henry Kirkham, Fireman, Lytham St. Annes Fire Brigade
- George Lament, Inspector, Lanarkshire Constabulary
- Francis Graham Marshall, Sub-District Commandant, Royal Ulster (Special) Constabulary
- Epbert Moore, Sergeant, Royal Ulster Constabulary
- William Burnett Smithwick, Market Constable, Liverpool
- Thomas Sumner, Constable, Lancashire Constabulary

=== Military Cross (MC) ===
- Captain Christopher Ronald Spear, 13th Frontier Force Rifles, 5th Battalion (late 58th Vaughan's Rifles, Frontier Force), Indian Army, in recognition of gallant and distinguished services in action during military operations in China in March 1927.

=== Air Force Cross (AFC) ===
- Flight Lieutenant Thomas Stanley Horry DFC
- Flight Lieutenant Robert Lyle McKendrick Barbour DFC
- Flight Lieutenant David D'Arcy Alexander Greig DFC

=== Air Force Medal (AFM) ===
- Flight Sergeant (Pilot) Harry Walter Woods
- Leading Aircraftman Francis Thomas Arney

=== Imperial Service Order (ISO) ===
Home Civil Service

- Frank Ernest Allum, Deputy Master of the Branch Mint at Perth, Western Australia
- Arliss Hayden Carter, Accountant, Ministry of Health
- David Crombie, Secretary and Inspector, Prison Commission for Scotland
- Henry Charles Glaysher MBE Senior Staff Clerk, War Office
- David Allan Gracey FIC Superintending Chemist, Government Chemist's Department
- Albert Thomas John Lister Guest, Clerk in charge of Registration and Muniments, Charity Commission
- Arthur Hogan MBE Senior Auditor, Exchequer and Audit Department
- Albert Edward Laslett, Engineer Surveyor-in-Chief and Inspector of Testing Establishments, Board of Trade
- Donald Macleod, Sub-Inspector, Scottish Education Department
- Edward John Metters, Chief Clerk, Children's Branch, Home Office
- Edward Parkes OBE Technical Assistant in Consular Department, Foreign Office
- George Slater, Controller, Money Order Department, General Post Office
- Walter George Twort, Chief Inspector, National Insurance Audit Department
- William Vickers, Senior Staff Officer, Exchequer, Edinburgh

Dominions

- Harry Blinman MVO Under-Secretary, Secretary to the Premier and Clerk of the Executive Council, State of South Australia
- Captain John Bollons, Master of S.S. Tutanekai, Marine Department, Dominion of New Zealand
- Joshua Dyson Farrar, Chief Electoral Officer, Department of Home and Territories, Commonwealth of Australia
- Henry Latimer Walters, Secretary, Department of Works and Railways, Commonwealth of Australia
- Basil Hale Warner, lately an Assistant Commissioner in Swaziland

Indian Civil Service

- Khan Bahadur Hafiz Muhammad Wilayatullah, Deputy Commissioner, Bhandara, Central Provinces
- Khan Bahadur Ahmed Bakhsh, Assistant Residency Surgeon, Personal Assistant to the Administrative Medical Officer in Central India and Superintendent, Central India Agency Jail, Indore
- Ardeshir Edalji Servai JP Acting Under Secretary to the Government of Bombay in the Revenue Department
- Jogindra Chander Ghose, Punjab Civil Service, Secretary, District Board, Ludhiana, Punjab

Colonial Civil Service

- Cecil Molesworth Bunbury, Chief Engineer, Kenya and Uganda Railways
- Henry Casolani MBE Superintendent of Emigration, Malta
- Charles Herman Vidal Hall, lately Collector of Revenue, Jamaica
- George William Knapman, Establishment Officer, Secretariat, Kenya
- Philip Thomas Lamble, Superintendent of Staff and Works, Sanitary Department, Hong Kong
- Hugh McLaren, Principal of the Accra Technical School, Gold Coast
- Robert James Pereira, Extra Office Assistant to the Government Agent, Western Province, Ceylon
- Amaro John Reed, Accountant, Post Office, Hong Kong
- Ratu Deve Toganivalu, Member of the Legislative Council, and Provincial Commissioner, Fiji
- Leslie Tucker, Federal Inspector of Schools, Leeward Islands

=== Imperial Service Medal (ISM) ===
- Baroda Behari Banerji, late Senior Compositor, Press of the Private Secretary to His Excellency the Viceroy
- Sargonath Coomar, late Record Sorter, Foreign and Political Department of the Government of India
- Pandit Salig Rarn, Jamadar to the Chief Justice, High Court of Judicature at Allahabad
- Muhammad Moideen, late Duffadar, Legislative Council Office, Madras
- Saidai Khan of Yarkand, late Consulate Postman between Yarkand and Kashgar
- Hardwar Tiwari, late Reserve Warder and Orderly to the Inspector-General of Prisons, United Provinces
