= Robert Noble =

Robert Noble may refer to:

- Robert Noble (physician) (1910–1990), Canadian physician involved in the discovery of vinblastine
- Robert Noble (company), Scottish textile company established 1666
- Robert Noble (artist) (1857–1917), Scottish landscape artist
- Robert Noble Jones (1864–1942), New Zealand lawyer, public servant and land court judge
- Robert Houston Noble (1861–1939), US Army general who commanded the 158th Infantry Brigade
- Robert Noble (actor), actor in Held for Ransom (2000 film)
- Robert Noble (diplomat), see List of Canadian diplomats

== See also ==
- Bobby Noble (disambiguation)
- Bob Noble (disambiguation)
- Roberto Noble (1902–1969), Argentine politician, journalist and publisher
- Ronald Noble, American law enforcement officer
