= MacKubin =

MacKubin or Mackubin may refer to:

- Florence MacKubin (c. 1857–1918), American portrait painter
- Mackubin Thomas Owens

== See also ==
- George Mackubin & Co., predecessor of the American firm Legg Mason
