= William Henry Fitchett =

Australian educator, journalist and writer (1841–1928)

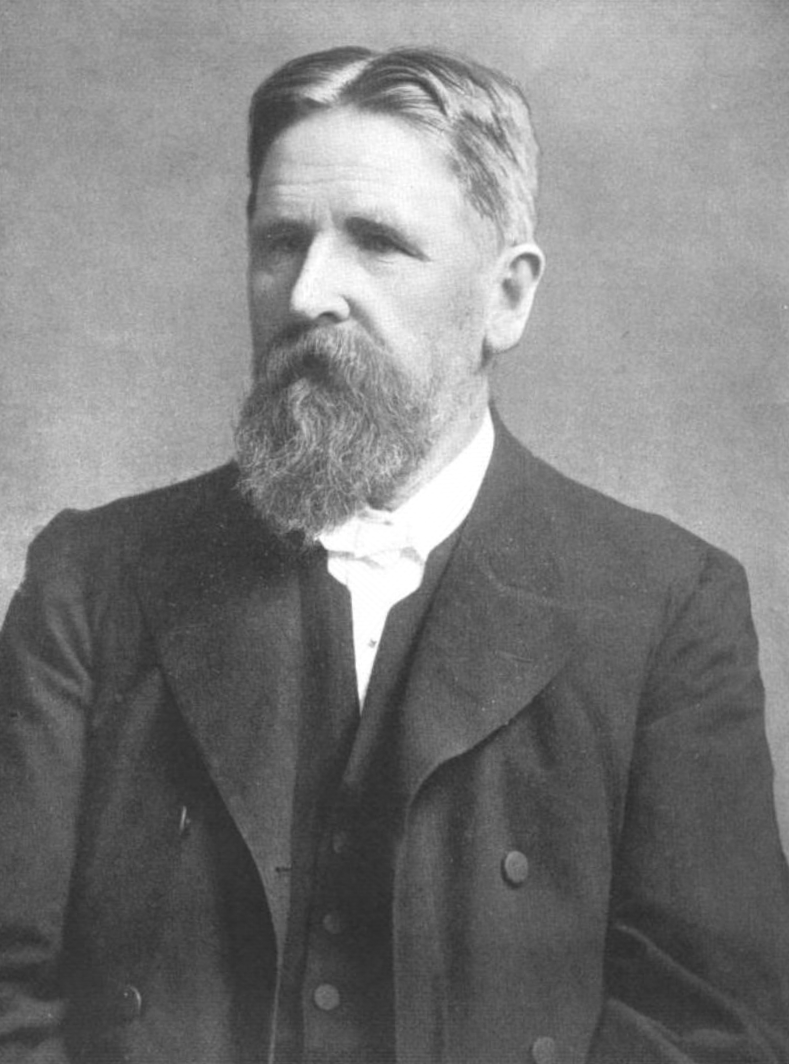
- In The Sketch, 20 December 1899
- Born: 9 August 1841; Grantham, Lincolnshire, England
- Died: 25 May 1928 (aged 86); Kew, Victoria, Australia
- Occupations: Journalist, writer, minister, educator
- Known for: Founder of the Methodist Ladies' College, Melbourne
- Relatives: Alfred Fitchett (brother); Frederick Fitchett (brother); Billy Fitchett (nephew); Margaret Fitchett (niece); Ian Fitchett (grandson)

William Henry Fitchett (9 August 1841 – 25 May 1928) was an Australian journalist, minister, newspaper editor, educator and founding president of the Methodist Ladies' College, Melbourne.

== Early life ==
Fitchett was born in Grantham, Lincolnshire, England, third son of William Fitchett (c. 1813 – 22 December 1851), a perfumer, hairdresser, clog and patten-maker, toy-dealer and Wesleyan preacher. He arrived with his parents by the immigrant ship Larpent in August 1849; his father died a few years later. (Note: Assertions by C. I. Benson of Larpent arriving in 1853 and W. Fitchett sen. dying in 1854 may be disregarded.)

== Literary career ==
- Fights for the Flag (1898)
- Wellington's Men (1900)
- The Tale of the Great Mutiny (1901)
- Nelson and his Captains (1902)
- The New World of the South: Australia in the making (1903)
- How England Saved Europe, 4 vols. (1909)
- The Great Duke, 2 vols. (1911)
- The Romance of Australian History (1913)

Fitchett also produced four volumes of fiction:

- The Commander of the Hirondelle (1904)
- Ithuriel's Spear (1906)
- A Pawn in the Game (1908)
- The Adventures of an Ensign (1917)

Also four books on religion:

- The Unrealized Logic of Religion (1905)
- Wesley and his Century (1906)
- The Beliefs of Unbelief (1908)
- Where the Higher Criticism Fails (1922)

== C. Irving Benson ==
Fitchett became mentor to the young Benson, later a long-serving superintendent of the Central Mission and the first Methodist to be knighted. He encouraged the literary endeavors of his young protégé, who repaid the compliment in a glowing biography in his Herald column "Church and People": in 1928 repeated in 1942, the centenary of his birth.

== Death and legacy ==
Fitchett died at the school on 25 May 1928 from a haemorrhage of a duodenal ulcer. He married twice: firstly on 24 March 1870 to (Jemima) Cara Shaw, who died on 15 September 1918 and secondly to Edith Skelton Williams, née Wimble, the widow of the Rev. William Williams. He had five sons and one daughter of the first marriage. His fourth son, also named William Henry Fitchett M.B., B.S., D.D.R., D.Ph. (c. 1877 – 21 April 1950) began studying medicine at age 34.
