= Ian Fitchett =

Australian journalist (1908–1988)

Ian Glynn Fitchett
- Born: 11 September 1908; Terang, Victoria, Australia
- Died: 10 October 1988 (aged 80); Canberra, Australian Capital Territory
- Occupations: Journalist, war correspondent
- Years active: 1937–1974
- Employer(s): Daily Telegraph, The Age, The Sydney Morning Herald, Daily Express
- Known for: Political reporting; Second World War correspondence
- Notable work: Political coverage for The Age and The Sydney Morning Herald
- Spouse: Florence Myrtle Edlington (née Clutton) (m. 1959; died 1974)
- Military career
- Allegiance: Australia
- Branch: Australian Army
- Service years: 1939–1941
- Rank: Sergeant
- Unit: 2/4th Battalion
- Conflicts: North African campaign, Siege of Tobruk, Malayan campaign
- Awards: Africa Star; Pacific Star with Burma Clasp; Defence Medal; War Medal 1939–1945; Australia Service Medal; Elizabeth II Coronation Medal

Ian Glynn Fitchett (11 September 1908 – 10 October 1988) was an Australian journalist who specialised in political reporting and also worked as a war correspondent during the Second World War.

== Early life and education ==
Fitchett was born in Terang, Victoria, on 11 September 1908, the third child in a family of four. His father, Alfred Shaw Fitchett, was a solicitor, and his mother, Nellie (née Delany), came from an Irish Catholic family. His paternal grandfather, William Henry Fitchett was a Methodist clergyman and writer. He was taught initially by private tutors, later attending the local Convent of Mercy school and Xavier College in Melbourne.

He undertook legal training under his uncle, Frank Fitchett, and qualified as a barrister and solicitor in March 1935. After a short period as associate to Justice Sir Hayden Starke, he left the legal profession to pursue journalism.

== Career in journalism ==
Fitchett began his newspaper career in 1937 when he joined The Daily Telegraph in Sydney as a senior cadet, reporting primarily on federal politics in Canberra.

=== Military service and war reporting ===
Enlisting in the Second Australian Imperial Force in October 1939, Fitchett served as a sergeant in the 2/4th Battalion. During the voyage to the Middle East in early 1940, he began reporting as a war correspondent. He was discharged from military service in early 1941 to take up the role of assistant official war correspondent in the Middle East.

While in that role, he covered the Libyan campaign and spent several weeks inside Tobruk during its siege. Later in 1941, he was assigned as official war correspondent to the 8th Division in Malaya. He remained there until early February 1942, departing just days before Singapore fell to Japanese forces. Fitchett travelled via Java and eventually returned to Australia. He then undertook work for the Department of Information in various locations, including Papua and New Caledonia.

From 1943 to the end of the war, he reported for both the Daily Telegraph and the London Daily Express, covering military developments across Burma, India and China under South-East Asia Command.

=== Post-war political reporting ===
After the war, Fitchett briefly returned to the Daily Telegraph before joining The Age in 1947 as its political correspondent in Canberra.Within the Federal Parliamentary Press Gallery, he was regarded as an experienced political reporter and acted as an informal mentor to several younger journalists.

In 1960, he moved to The Sydney Morning Herald, where he spent ten years covering national politics before focusing on defence and diplomatic issues.

He retired from writing in 1974.

== Personal life ==
On 24 January 1959, Fitchett married Florence Myrtle Edlington (née Clutton) at St Aloysius' Catholic Church in Cronulla, New South Wales. She died in 1974. In his later years, he conducted research on Australian military history for the Australian War Memorial in Canberra.

== Death ==
Fitchett died in Canberra on 10 October 1988 at the age of 80.

== Honours and awards ==

1939–1945 Star
Africa Star
Pacific Star with Burma Clasp
Defence Medal
War Medal 1939–45
Australia Service Medal 1939–45
Queen Elizabeth II Coronation Medal
