= 1928 Birthday Honours (New Zealand) =

Awards list for New Zealand

The 1928 King's Birthday Honours in New Zealand, celebrating the official birthday of King George V, were appointments made by the King on the recommendation of the New Zealand government to various orders and honours to reward and highlight good works by New Zealanders. They were announced on 4 June 1928.

The recipients of honours are displayed here as they were styled before their new honour.

== Knight Bachelor ==
- The Honourable George Fowlds CBE – of Auckland; president of Auckland University College. For public services.
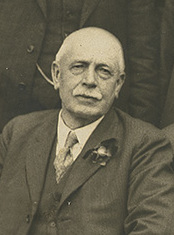
Sir George Fowlds

== Order of Saint Michael and Saint George ==
=== Companion (CMG) ===
- The Very Reverend Alfred Robertson Fitchett MA DD – dean of Dunedin.
- Henry James Manson – New Zealand trade commissioner in Australia.
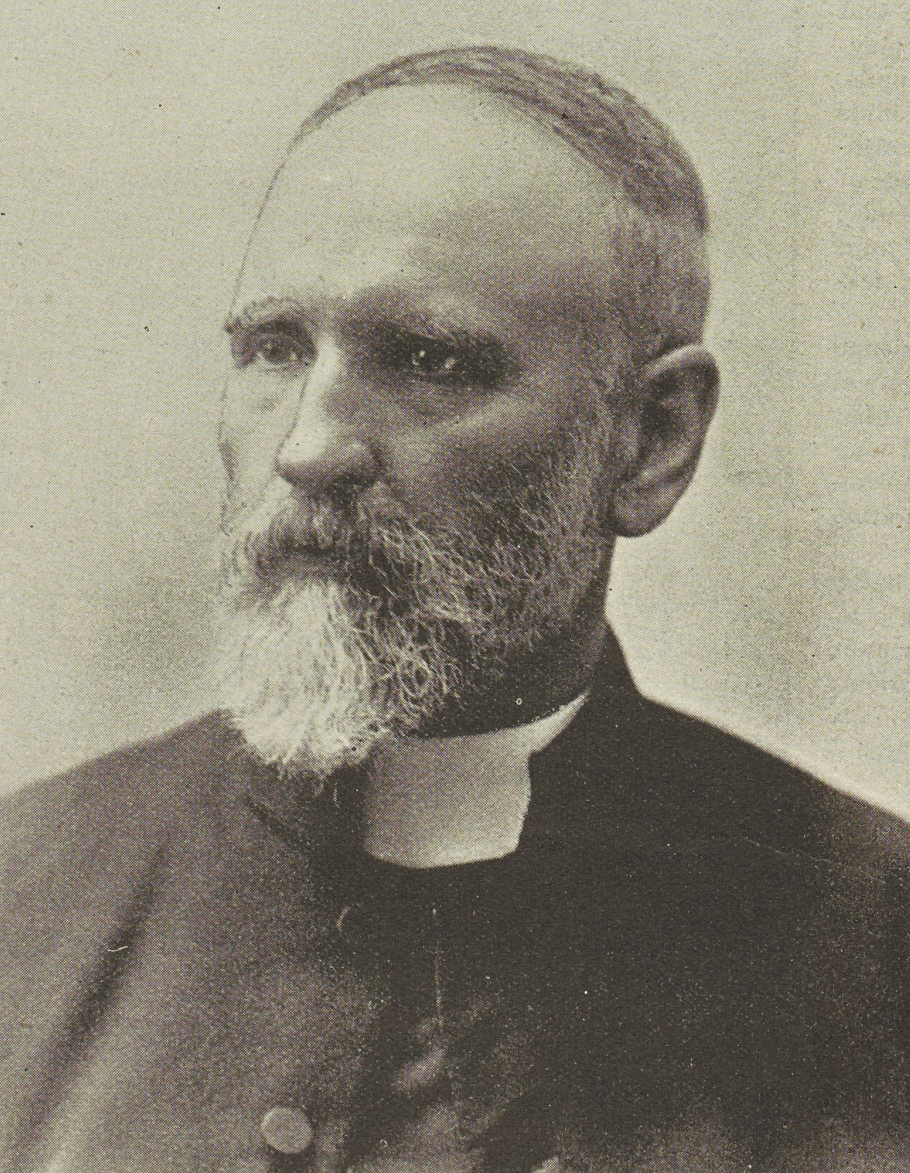
Alfred Fitchett

== Order of the British Empire ==
=== Commander (CBE) ===
Civil division

- Robert Noble Jones – chief judge of the Native Land Court and under-secretary for Native Affairs.
- Mary McLean MA – lately principal of Wellington Girls' College.
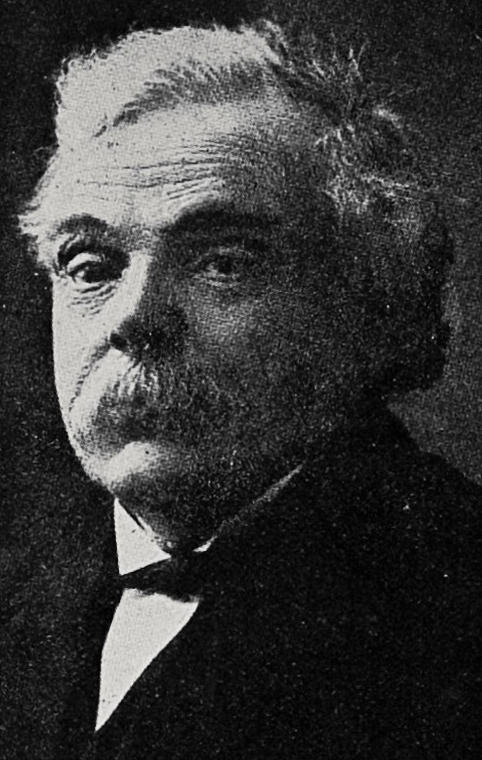
Robert Noble Jones

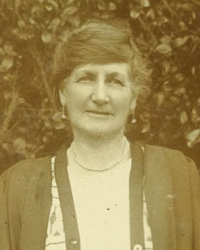
Mary McLean

== Companion of the Imperial Service Order (ISO) ==
- Captain John Bollons – master of SS Tutanekai, Marine Department.
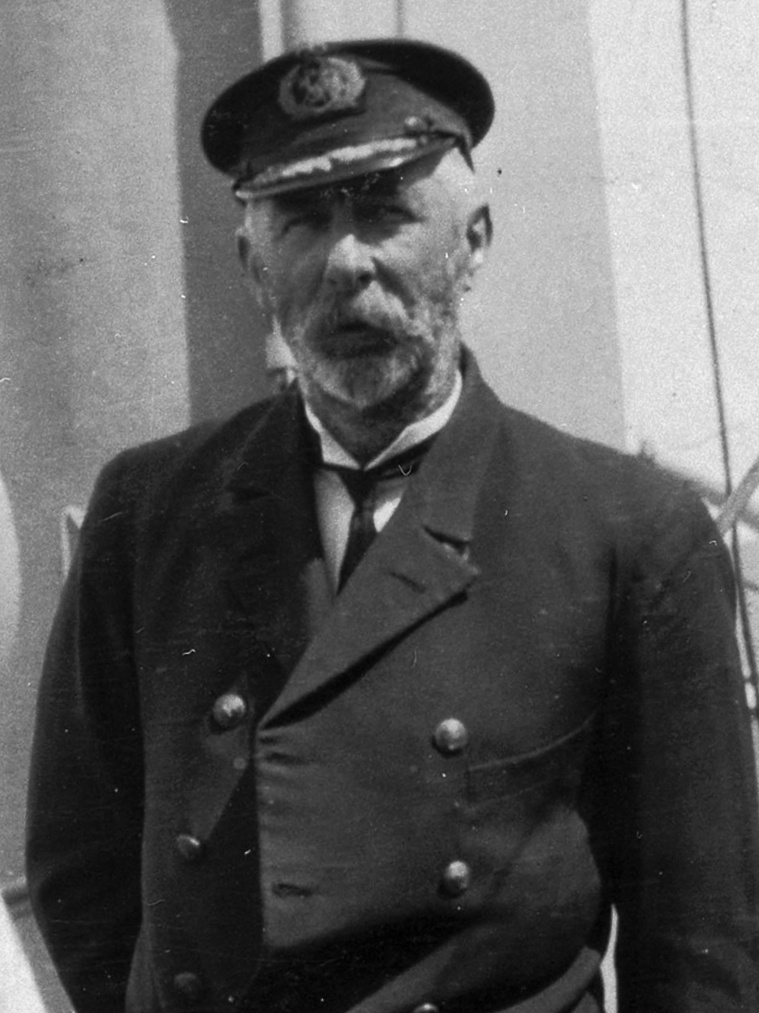
John Bollons
