= Isabel Ormiston =

Australian medical doctor (1883–1958)

Isabel Ormiston MBE OBE
- Born: Martha Isabel Ormiston; 1883; Albury, New South Wales
- Died: July 1958 (aged 74–75); Sydney
- Other name: Isabel Garvice

Martha Isabel Ormiston MBE OBE (1883–1958) later known as Isabel Garvice was an Australian medical doctor who was recognised for her service with the British Army in the First World War.

== Early life ==
Ormiston was born in Albury, New South Wales, one of nine children born to Sarah and Andrew Ormiston. She attended Albury Superior Public School, later known as Riverine Grammar, winning the classics prize in her last year. Originally enrolling as an Arts student at the University of Sydney, she boarded at the Women's College. In 1902, she switched to medicine and graduated as a doctor 1907.

== Career ==
Ormiston travelled to Brisbane to complete her residency at the Bowen Hospital for Children. In September 1910, her first appointment was in the public health sector in Tasmania, as the health inspector of Tasmanian schools, and travelled around the state for her work. She travelled to London in 1914 to attend the Victoria League Conference on Child Health and then travelled to Ireland. She was intending to gain her Diploma of Public Health at the University of Edinburgh, however, while she was still in Ireland World War I broke out.

=== World War I ===
Ormiston volunteered for the war effort, joining the Wounded Allies Relief Committee (WARC), which was organised in collaboration with the Red Cross, the Admiralty, and the War Office, and ran hospitals and specialist units in France, Belgium, and the Balkans. From October 1914 Ormiston was working in a 60 bed hospital in Ostend, Belgium, treating Belgian soldiers, and refugee women and children. She remained at her post at the L'Hôpital de L'Ocean, the Queen of the Belgians' Hospital when Ostend was invaded by Germany in 1914. Ormiston was a prisoner of the invading army until late October, when all British citizens were expelled from Belgium.

In early 1915 Ormiston returned to her work at the L'Hôpital de L'Ocean in La Panne, until WARC posted her to a hospital in Montenegro. However, when the Austrian Army invaded, she was forced into retreat on a perilous eight-day trip on horseback, through the Dinaric Alps to Salonica. During 1916, Ormiston worked at the British Red Cross Convalescent depot in Egypt. Her final posting was in 1917, when WARC sent her to a hospital in Limoges, France, until April 1918.

=== Post World War I ===
In 1919, Ormiston returned to Egypt and took a posting as a schools medical inspector. In January 1920 Ormiston married Chudleigh Garvice DSO OBE, the Commandant of Alexandra police. Chudleigh died 14 months later unexpectedly. Ormiston became the Senior Lady Medical Officer for the Egyptian Ministry of Education in Alexandria. This role saw her overseeing the health of 40,000 children, with a staff of 5 doctors and forty nurses.

In 1935, she was the first woman passenger to travel from Egypt to Australia on Imperial Airlines.

=== World War II ===
On top of her role at the Egyptian Ministry of Education, Ormiston took on extra work as an anaesthetist at a military hospital in Cairo during World War II.

== Later years ==
Ormiston retired in 1949, and returned to Australia to be with her family. She died in July 1958 in Sydney, Australia.

== Awards ==
- For her service in Montenegro during World War I Ormiston was Mentioned in dispatches and awarded the Montenegrin Red Cross and Orders of Danilo by King Nicolas I.
- She received the French Red Cross for her service in World War I.
- She later received the Order of Leopold of Belgium, the King's medal for "conspicuous bravery and devotion to duty".
- In the 1928 Birthday Honours, she was made a Member of the Order of the British Empire. This was for her services to the community as the Senior Lady Medical Officer, Egyptian Ministry of Education.
- In the 1944 New Year Honours, she was made an Officer of the Order of the British Empire for her services in World War II.
