= Bob Noble =

Bob Noble may refer to:

- Bob Noble (ice hockey), coach of Orangeville Flyers
- Bob Noble (politician), in Canadian federal election results in Eastern Ontario
- Bob Noble (actor) in King's Quest III: To Heir Is Human (AGD Interactive)

== See also ==
- Bobby Noble (disambiguation)
- Robert Noble (disambiguation)
