= Bipin Krishna Bose =

Indian advocate

Rai Bahadur Sir Bipin Krishna Bose KCIE
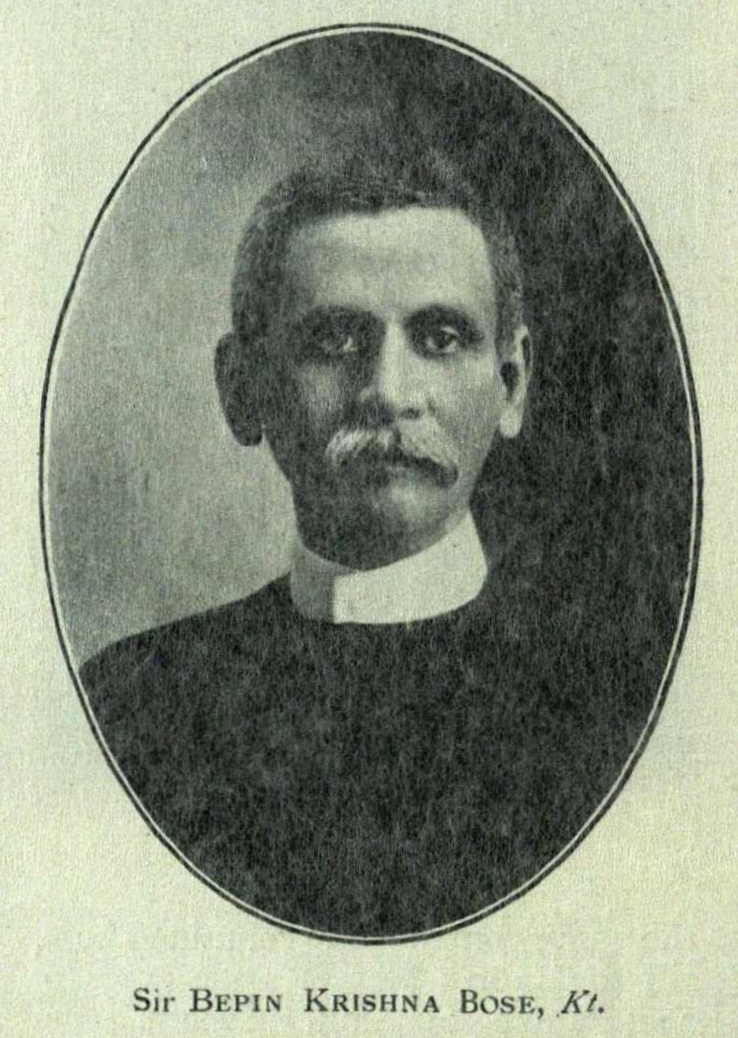
- Bipin Krishna Bose in 1909
- Born: 21 January 1851; Calcutta, Bengal Presidency, British Raj
- Died: 26 August 1933 (age 82); Calcutta, Bengal Presidency, British Raj
- Occupation: advocate
- Awards: Kaisar-i-Hind Medal (1928)

Rai Bahadur Sir Bipin Krishna Bose KCIE (21 January 1851 – 26 August 1933) was an Indian advocate.

Bose started his law practice at Jubbulpore (now Jabalpur) in 1872, and moved to Nagpur, Central Provinces, in 1874. He was a member of the municipal committee and the boards of higher education institutions. He was appointed Government Advocate in 1888.

He was also Vice-Chancellor of Nagpur University. He was elected to the Council of India on 19 December 1903 as a non-official member representing the Central Provinces.

He was appointed Companion of the Order of the Indian Empire (CIE) in 1898, knighted in 1907, and appointed Knight Commander of the Order of the Indian Empire (KCIE) in the 1920 New Year Honours. He was awarded the Kaisar-i-Hind Medal in the 1928 Birthday Honours for his services as vice-chancellor of Nagpur University.
