= William Marshall Fordham =

British Indian Army officer (1875–1959)

- Born: 9 August 1875
- Died: 9 December 1959 (aged 84); Felixstowe
- Military career
- Allegiance: United Kingdom
- Branch: British Indian Army
- Service years: 1897 – 1932
- Rank: Brigadier
- Conflicts: Boxer Rebellion; First World War
- Awards: CB, CBE

Brigadier William Marshall Fordham CB CBE (9 August 1875 – 9 December 1959) was a senior British Indian Army officer who served during the First World War.

Born on 9 August 1875, William Marshall Fordham was educated at Bedford School, between 1887 and 1893, and at Royal Military College, Sandhurst. He served on the North West Frontier, between 1897 and 1898, in China during the Boxer Rebellion, in 1900. He was appointed Military Attache to the British Legation at Tehran in 1911. He served during the First World War, between 1914 and 1918, and in Waziristan, between 1922 and 1923.

He was Aide-de-camp to King George V between 1930 and 1932 and Commander of the 1st Infantry Brigade, in Abbottabad, India between 1928 and 1932.

He retired from the British Indian Army in 1932.

Fordham was appointed Commander of the Order of the British Empire (CBE) in 1924, in connection with military operations in Waziristan, and Companion of the Order of the Bath (CB) in the 1928 Birthday Honours.

He died in Felixstowe on 9 December 1959.
