= Muriel Hanschell =

Barbadian social worker and politician

Nominated Member of the Legislative Council
- In office 1949–1954

Personal details
- Born: 3 October 1884 Barbados
- Died: 28 May 1971 (aged 86)

Muriel Hanschell MBE (3 October 1884 – 28 May 1971) was a Barbadian social worker and politician. She was appointed to the Legislative Council in 1949, becoming the first female member of the Parliament of Barbados.

== Biography ==
Hanschell was born in Barbados in October 1884, the daughter of Herbert Greaves, the Chief Justice of Barbados. She was educated at Queen's College on the island before attending Newnham College at the University of Cambridge, where she earned a BA in mathematics. Returning to Barbados, she began carrying out social work, initially by distributing milk powder from her garage. She married Albert James Hanschell in 1912 and had three children.

In 1921 she co-founded the Child Health Committee (later known as the Baby Welfare League), serving as its secretary and later president. She was also president of the Family Welfare Society and Naval Welfare League, and served on the Board of Governors of the St. Michael School between 1928 and 1945. she was awarded an MBE in the 1928 Birthday Honours.

In 1949 Hanschell was appointed to the Legislative Council, becoming the first female member of the Barbadian parliament. She remained a member until retiring in 1954.

She died on 28 May 1971.
