= Bobby Noble =

Bobby Noble may refer to:

- Bobby Noble (academic), scholar of transgender studies
- Bobby Noble (footballer, born 1945) (1945–2023), English footballer
- Bobby Noble (footballer, born 1949) (1949–2005), English footballer

== See also ==
- Bob Noble (disambiguation)
- Robert Noble (disambiguation)
