= John Oakley (surveyor) =

Sir John Oakley GBE
- Born: John Hubert Oakley; 1867; Kensington, London, England
- Died: 5 December 1946 (aged 78–79)
- Occupation: Surveyor

Sir John Hubert Oakley (1867 – 5 December 1946) was a British surveyor. He was the head of the firm of D. Smith, Oakley and Garrard.

Oakley was born in Kensington, London, the eldest son of Christopher Percival Oakley, surveyor, and Kate Oakley, née Kingsford. An uncle was John Oakley, Dean of Manchester. He was educated at Uppingham School and the Royal Agricultural College, after which he joined the family firm of Daniel Smith, Son and Oakley (later Daniel Smith, Oakley and Garrard).

Oakley served on numerous royal commissions and government committees, including the Royal Commission, Oxford and Cambridge University (Estates), 1919–21; Committee on Crown and Government Lands, 1921–22; Royal Commission on Compensation for suffering and damage caused by enemy action, 1922–24; River Ouse Drainage Commission, 1925–26; and the Irish Grants Committee, 1926–29.

Oakley was knighted in 1919 and appointed a Knight Grand Cross of the Order of the British Empire (GBE) in the 1928 Birthday Honours.
