= Florence MacKubin =

American painter

Coordinates: 38°58′54.69″N 76°29′49.73″W

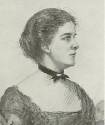
- Self-portrait
- Born: c. 1857; Florence, Grand Duchy of Tuscany
- Died: February 2, 1918 (aged 60); Baltimore, Maryland, U.S.
- Resting place: St. Anne's Cemetery, Annapolis, Maryland
- Known for: Painting

Florence MacKubin (or Mackubin) (c. 1857 – 1918) was an American portrait painter in miniature, pastel, and oil colors. She painted portraits of prominent people in the United States and the United Kingdom, as well as several famous copies of portraits, and exhibited at the Paris Salon, the London Academy, and the National Academy, New York.

== Early life ==
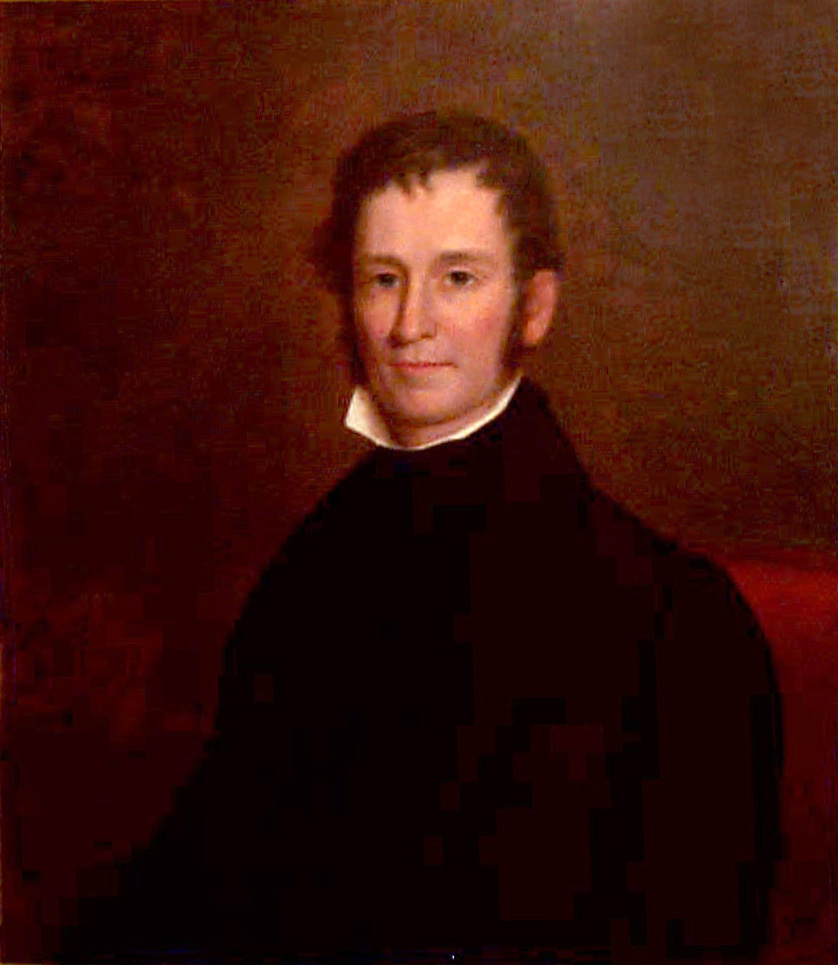
Florence MacKubin, George Mackubin (1789-1853), 1905, State of Maryland

Florence MacKubin was born in about 1857 (Note: Her year of birth has also been given as 1861. But Florence was listed as a 3 year-old, born in Florence, Italy, on the 1860 U.S. Census in St. Paul, Minnesota. Her month and day of birth are stated as May 19 by Who's Who, who thought she was born in the 1860s.) in Florence, Grand Duchy of Tuscany, while her parents, Charles Nicholas and Ellen Marietta (Fay) MacKubin, were spending a year abroad. Her father died in 1863, after which her mother returned to Europe with the children.

MacKubin made a portrait of her grandfather, George Mackubin, who had been the Treasurer of the Western Shore, for the State of Maryland.

== Education ==
MacKubin studied drawing in Florence, Italy. She then studied at Les Ruches, a Protestant school at Fontainbleau under M. Lainé. In Munich she studied under Professor Herterich. She studied under Louis Deschamps in oil and Julius Rolshoven in pastel, and Mlle. Jeanne Devina in miniature painting in Paris.

== Career ==
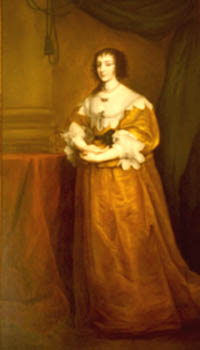
Queen Henrietta Maria, 1901, Maryland State House

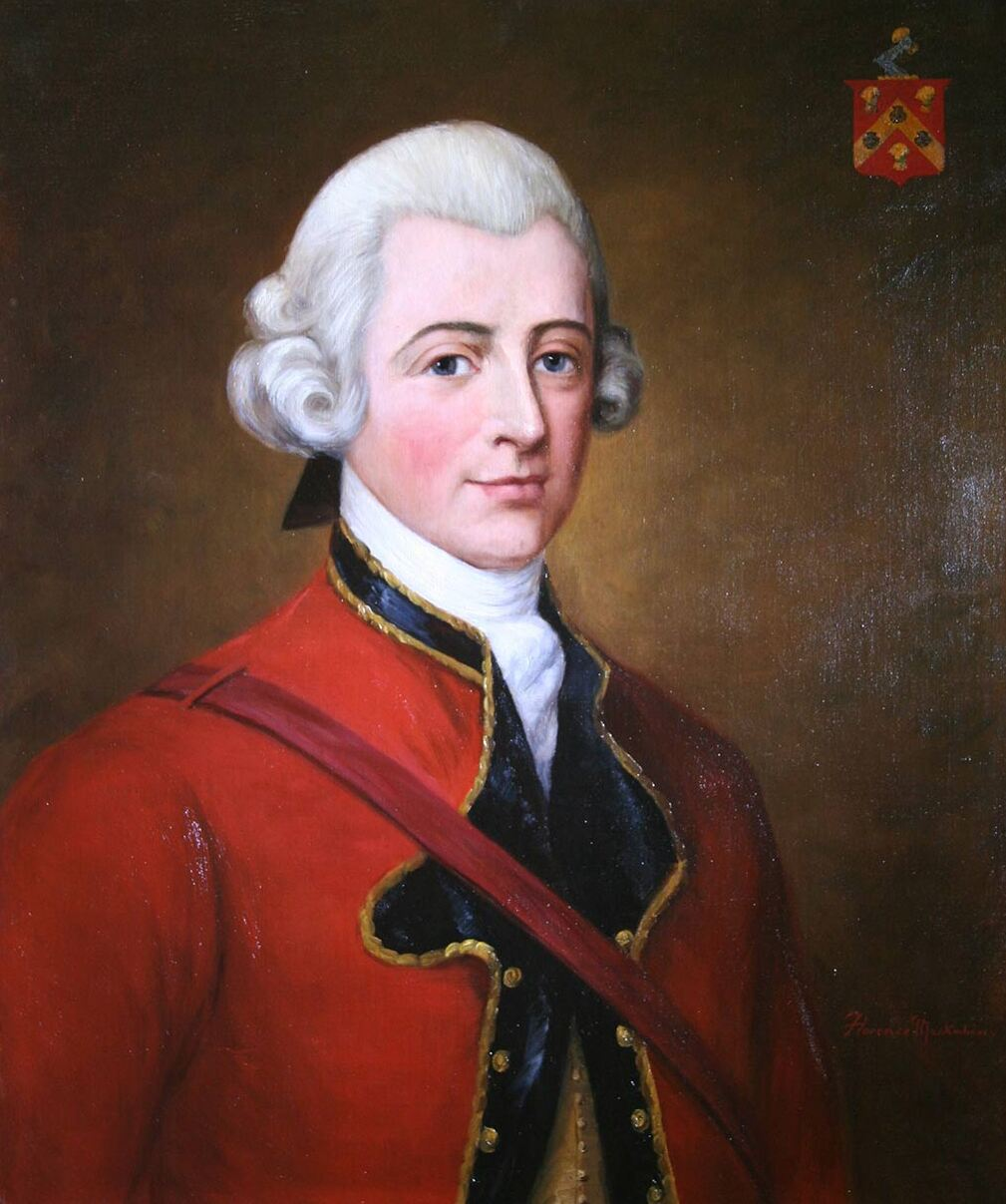
Sir Robert Eden, 1st Baronet, of Maryland. MacKubin made paintings of her ancestors, the first and second Barons Baltimore, based upon originals owned by Sir William Eden. He was governor of Maryland from 1769 to 1776.

The Board of Public Works of Maryland appointed her to make copies of portraits of George Calvert, 1st Baron Baltimore and Cecil Calvert, 2nd Baron Baltimore. For the Board she also painted a copy of Warwick Castle's famous Van Dyke portrait of Queen Henrietta Maria, for whom Maryland is named.

MacKubin made paintings of society women in England and in the United States cities of Boston, New York, Baltimore, Washington, and St. Louis. In 12 years she received commissions for 360 miniature portraits. The people whose portraits she painted include Joel Chandler Harris, Basil Gildersleeve, Mrs. Charles J. Bonaparte, Justice Horace Gray, Senator George F. Hoar, and Mrs. Thomas F. Bayard.

MacKubin began exhibiting her works and winning awards in the United States, London and Paris beginning in 1893. She exhibited her work at the Palace of Fine Arts and The Woman's Building at the 1893 World's Columbian Exposition in Chicago, Illinois. In 1897 she won the bronze medal and diploma at the Tennessee Exposition. Her life-sized portrait of Cardinal Gibbons was exhibited in 1903 in Baltimore and in 1904 at the St. Louis Exposition. She exhibited at the Royal Academy of Arts and made portraits of the Marchioness of Bath, the Countess of Warwick and others in England.

She was vice president of the Baltimore Watercolor Club.

MacKubin resided in Baltimore for most of her life and kept a studio and summer home in St. Andrews, New Brunswick.

== Personal life ==
MacKubin was a member of the Maryland Society of the Colonial Dames of America.

She died February 2, 1918. Richard H. Spencer of the Maryland Historical Society said of her:

In the death of Miss Florence MacKubin, this Society has lost a valued and esteemed member, the State of Maryland a loyal and devoted daughter and the world of art a conscientious and meritorious disciple.
