= Louis Deschamps =

French painter (1846–1902)

Louis Henri Deschamps was a French painter born on 25 May 1846 in Montélimar, (Drome); died 8 August 1902 in Montélimar.

== Biography ==
He was born on 25 May 1846 from Sebastien Deschamps and Hanriette Chames and gifted with natural artistic talent, after an initial training at the local school, he was educated, first, at the École nationale supérieure des beaux-arts de Lyon under Michel Dumas (painter) and Jean-Marie Reignier and in 1872 he entered the École nationale supérieure des beaux-arts in Paris, where he was a student of Alexandre Cabanel. He exhibited his paintings at the Salon (Paris) from 1872 to 1889, then at the Salon of the National Society of Fine Arts from 1890 to 1900, as well as in the Salons of the Society of Friends of the Arts of Bordeaux. In 1877 he won a bronze medal at the Salon and an other at the Exposition Universelle (1889) in Paris. On 8 December 1892 he was made knight of the Legion of Honour for artistic merits. In 1884 he presented at the Salon with some of the other most prestigious painters an illustration of the poem “Thing seen on a spring day” from Victor Hugo's National Edition of Contemplations. The original has been lost but a detailed study for the composition of the Salon, or a partial reduction is now at Maison de Victor Hugo - Hauteville House. Deschamps was very fond of his hometown where he spent few months every year and for the remainder lived in Paris, first in boulevard Berthier 31 and then, like other artists of the late 19th and early 20th centuries, in rue Laugier in the 17th arrondissement. After he was awarded with a gold medal at the Exposition Universelle (1900) in Paris the symptoms of a disease forced him to retire to his native Montelimar and led to his death in August 1902. He was an appreciated painting teacher and among his pupils can be remembered William Marshall Brown (1863 – 1936), Florence MacKubin (1857 – 1918), Harriet Halhed (1850–1933), Alice Stone (1859 - 1952) and among the artists from Montelimar: Louis Discours (1870 - after 1915) and Charles Drivon (1860 - after 1903) whose artistic production was greatly influenced by his master. A silver photograph on cardboard of Louis Deschamps, by Eugène Pirou, is at the Musée d'Orsay. The rue Louis Deschamps in Montélimar was named in his honor.

== Artwork ==
Louis Deschamps enjoyed academic and commercial success, exhibiting at the Paris Salon, from 1872, firstly his historical genre and then scenes of rustic life. It was in Paris where he developed his great talent. He also painted in watercolour and pastel, subjects, which included portraits, religious scenes, historical genre and paintings illustrating social and human themes such as poor peasants, abandoned babies and seduced young girls often using young natural peasant girls as his models and inspiration. His brushwork is dense and pasty. The facial expressions of his sitters, of great emotional intensity, are rendered with muffled tones and unfinished shapes and emerge, with contrast, from the dark backgrounds. The color is spread on the canvas with a brushstroke of great spontaneity following a sudden inspiration almost in the absence of a preparatory drawing. Some of his works became so famous that they were reproduced in prints.

== Works ==
- “Children and chicks”, 1873, oil on canvas, St Pierre church - Le Renouard - Orne - Lower Normandy
- “Moses saved from the waters”, 1875, oil on canvas
- “Hagar and the Favorite, 1876, oil on canvas
- “The poor girl”, 1877, oil on canvas
- “The Small Screening Machine”, 1878, oil on canvas, Montélimar museum.
- “The death of Mireille”, 1879, oil on canvas, an episode of the "Mirèio" by Frédéric Mistral, Musée des beaux-arts de Marseille
- “Prayer”,1880, oil on canvas, Musée Antoine-Lécuyer
- “Vincent wounded”, 1881, oil on canvas, an episode of the "Mireille" by Frédéric Mistral, Calvet Museum in Avignon
- “Resignation”,1882, oil on canvas
- “Portrait of an old man”, 1882, oil on wood
- “The daughter-mother”, 1883, oil on canvas
- “The Contemplations (V. Hugo)”, 1884, oil on canvas, Maison de Victor Hugo - Hauteville House
- "The abandoned" or "The infant", 1885, Fine Arts Museums of San Francisco
- “A young girl holding a violin” 1885, oil on canvas
- “The baby” 1886, oil on canvas, Royal Museums of Fine Arts of Belgium.
- “Paternity search” 1887, oil on canvas, Brou Museum in Bourg-en-Bresse.
- “The abandoned”, Watercolor, Louvre museum in Paris (graphic arts department)
- “Crazy woman” Gray wash, Louvre museum in Paris (graphic arts department)
- “The charity”, oil on canvas, Orsay Museum
- “The abandoned”, oil on canvas, Orsay Museum
