= Mary McLean =

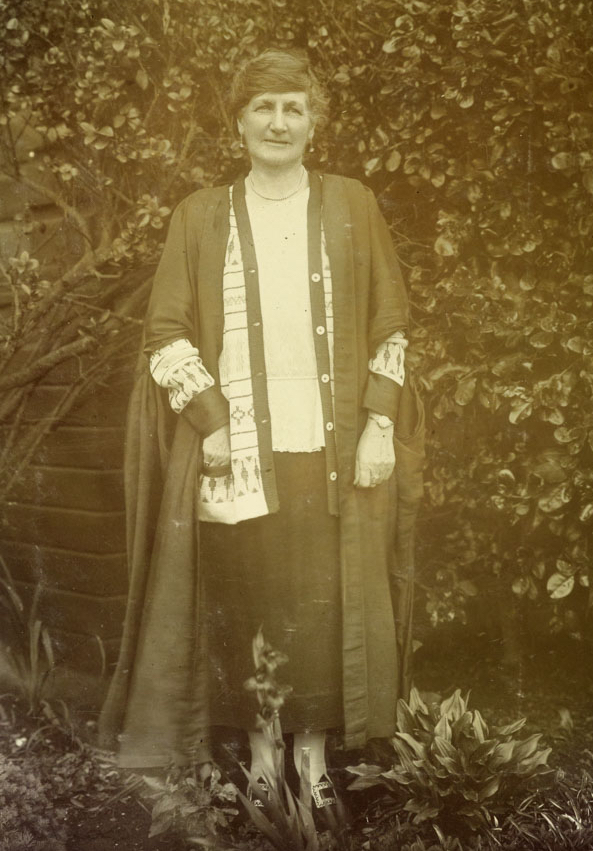
Mary McLean

Mary Jane McLean CBE (4 April 1866 – 9 February 1949) was a New Zealand school principal. She was born in Timaru, New Zealand, on 4 April 1866. She was principal of Wellington Girls' College from 1900 to 1926, when she retired. She was appointed a Commander of the Order of the British Empire (CBE) in the 1928 King's Birthday Honours.
