= Margaret Fitchett =

New Zealand artist

Hannah Margaret Edith Fitchett (married name Elmore, 16 June 1875 – 6 October 1958), sometimes called Daisy Fitchett, was a New Zealand artist.

== Biography ==
Fitchett was born at the parsonage in the Christchurch suburb of St Albans, the daughter of Alfred Fitchett, later Dean of Dunedin, and Theresa Margaret Fitchett. She studied at Dunedin Art School (now Otago Polytechnic), then traveled to Europe to study in Dresden under portrait painter Franz Kops. Fitchett also studied in Paris at the Académie Julian, Rue de Berri, where her professors included William-Adolphe Bouguereau and Gabriel Ferrier. Following her time at the Académie Julian, Fitchett studied under the tuition of impressionist Louis Deschamps

When Fitchett returned to Dunedin, she took pupils for a time before returning to Europe to study at the Royal Danish Academy of Fine Arts, under genre painter Viggo Johannsen and miniaturist Laura Sarauw.

Fitchett exhibited at the Otago Society of Arts between 1896 and 1908, and her work is represented in the collection of the Dunedin Public Art Gallery.

Fitchett married metallurgical engineer Frank Elmore at St Mary Abbots in Kensington, London, on 12 December 1908, and lived in England until her death in Cuckfield, Sussex, on 6 October 1958. She had been predeceased by her husband in 1932.
