= Vichot =

Vichot is a surname. Notable people with the surname include:

- Arthur Vichot (born 1988), French cyclist
- Frédéric Vichot (born 1959), French cyclist
