= Robert Noble Jones =

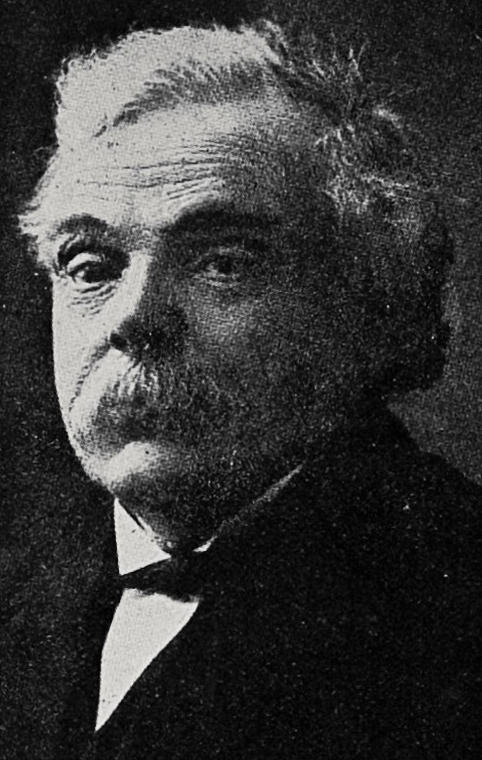
Robert Noble Jones

Robert Noble Jones CBE (1 August 1864–29 June 1942) was a New Zealand lawyer, public servant and land court judge. He was born in Belfast, County Antrim, Ireland, on 1 August 1864, and brought to New Zealand as an infant by his parents.

He was appointed Chief Judge of the Native Land Court in August, 1919, and held the position until 1939.

In the 1928 King's Birthday Honours, Jones was appointed a Commander of the Order of the British Empire.
