= Alfred Fitchett =

Anglican dean

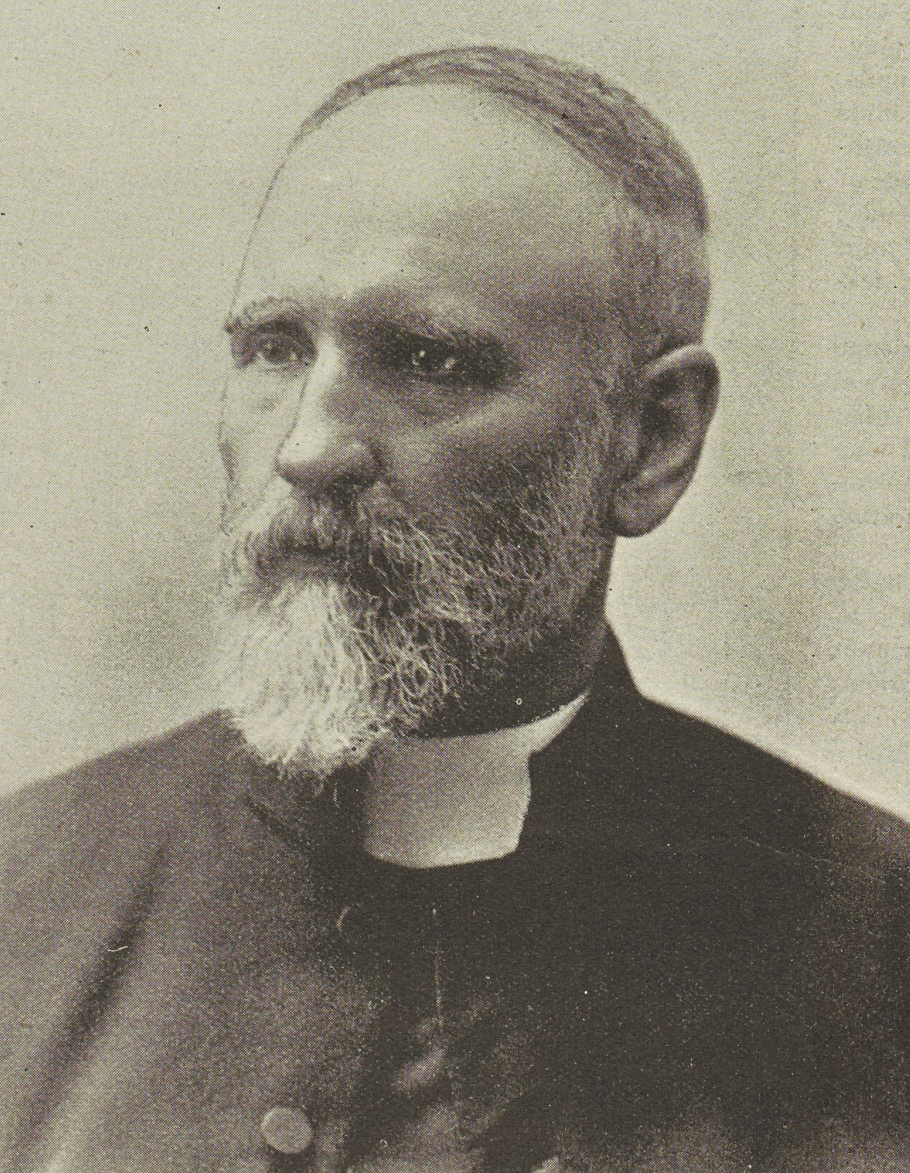
Alfred Fitchett

Alfred Robertson Fitchett CMG (1836 – 19 April 1929) was the Dean of Dunedin from 1894 until 1929.

Born in Grantham, Lincolnshire, England, in 1836, Fitchett was ordained in 1879, and graduated MA from the University of Otago in 1882. He was Vicar of All Saints' Church, Dunedin for 49 years, he continued at All Saints as well as being Dean: he was also Archdeacon of Dunedin from 1915 to 1919.

In the 1928 King's Birthday Honours, Fitchett was appointed a Companion of the Order of St Michael and St George. He died in Dunedin on 19 April 1929, and was buried in the Dunedin Northern Cemetery.

His son, William Fitchett, was Bishop of Dunedin from 1934 to 1952. His daughter, Margaret Fitchett, was an artist.
