= Nunu =

Nunu may refer to:

== People ==
- Jemma Nunu Kumba (born 1966), South Sudanese politician
- Nunu Abashydze (born 1955), Ukrainian shot putter
- Nunu Datau, Indonesian actress
- Nunu Khumalo (born 1992), South African actress and model
- Nunù Sanchioni, Italian operatic singer
- Thamsanqa Keith Nunu (born 1998), Zimbabwean cricket player
- Nunu (born 1998), Israeli singer and performer

== Places ==
- Ñuñu Qullu (disambiguation), name of several mountains in Bolivia
- San Vicente Nuñú, Mexico
- Nunu Kumba, Ethiopia

== Other ==
- Nunu language
- Nunu, from League of Legends
- Nu-nu, herbal stimulant
- Nunu dialect of Ngiri language
