= Evelyn Scotney =

Australian soprano

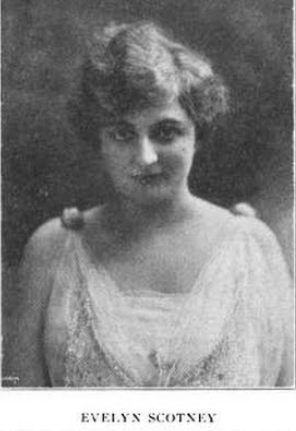
Evelyn Scotney, from a 1920 publication.

Evelyn Scotney (11 July 1896 – 5 August 1967) was an Australian lyric coloratura soprano of great renown in the period from 1913 to the late 1920s. Her range extended to E in altissimo. She was compared very favourably with Amelita Galli-Curci, Luisa Tetrazzini and others. Her recording of "Caro nome" from Verdi's Rigoletto was described by a critic as "one of the best soprano records in existence", and her recording of The Blue Danube and other Strauss vocal waltzes was described as "absolutely perfect coloratura singing". She appears in The Record of Singing.

== Biography ==
Evelyn Scotney was born in Ballarat in 1896, to parents Henry Bailey Scotney and Eliza Scotney. Her father was a professor from the University of Oxford who had come to Australia to study minerals, married there, and decided to stay. Her family moved to Melbourne when she was young. She studied singing there with Elise Wiedermann, who also taught Elsa Stralia, Florence Austral and others. She was first noticed by Nellie Melba, while singing at a reception for Lord Kitchener in Melbourne. Melba sent her to Paris to study with her own teacher Mathilde Marchesi. She later studied with Paolo Tosti in London. There she was heard by Henry Russell, the director of the Boston Opera Company, who engaged her to sing in Boston. She first appeared as La Charmeuse in Massenet's Thais, then deputised for Luisa Tetrazzini in the title role of Donizetti's Lucia di Lammermoor, the Mad Scene from which became her most famous part. In this and other roles she was said to surpass Tetrazzini. Her other roles in Boston included Carmen and Olympia (The Tales of Hoffmann). She also sang in Debussy's Le martyre de Saint Sébastien in 1912 with Jeska Swartz, conducted by André Caplet.

Evelyn Scotney married Howard J. White, a bass singer with the company, and was then known as "Madame Scotney". She later sang at the Metropolitan Opera in New York, in operas such as Rimsky-Korsakov's Le Coq d'Or, Lucia di Lammermoor, L'elisir d'amore and the revival of Fromental Halévy's La Juive, in which she sang opposite Enrico Caruso.

During World War I she had various tours of Australia with her husband. Her only brother Henry died in 1915, aged 21. She returned to the US after the war. It was Evelyn Scotney who appeared opposite Enrico Caruso in his final performance, in La Juive, on Christmas Eve 1920. She sang in Melbourne in 1923. By 1925 she was singing Gilda (Rigoletto) in London. She sang with the Beecham Opera Company and appeared at The Proms in the 1920s.

Evelyn Scotney remarried in London in the 1920s, to B. H. Russell, London manager of the Cunard Line. Their wedding was attended by Sir Joseph Cook (then Australian High Commissioner to the United Kingdom and a former Prime Minister of Australia) and Lady Cook. She and Russell had a son in 1924 and another son in mid-1926.

She gave a series of six Farewell Concerts in Australia in 1926.

Scotney Place, in the Canberra suburb of Chisholm, is named in her honour.

== Recordings ==
Evelyn Scotney's recordings include:

- "The Jewel Song" from Gounod's Faust (it can be heard here )
- "C'est histoire amoureuse" ("The Laughing Song") from Auber's Manon Lescaut
- "Charmant oiseau" from Félicien-César David's La perle du Brésil
- Polonaise ("Je suis Titania") from Thomas's Mignon
- "Una voce poco fa" from Rossini's The Barber of Seville
- "Caro nome" from Verdi's Rigoletto
- "Ah! fors' è lui" from Verdi's La traviata
- "Zun leiden bin ich" from Mozart's The Magic Flute
- Mozart's cavatina "Deh, non-varcar", from the concert aria "Ah, lo previdi", K. 272
- Sir Henry Bishop's "Lo! Here the Gentle Lark."
- some Scots folk songs (which were compared favourably with recordings by Isobel Baillie)

A full discography of Evelyn Scotney's recordings is available.
