= Clive Amadio =

Australian saxophonist and clarinettist

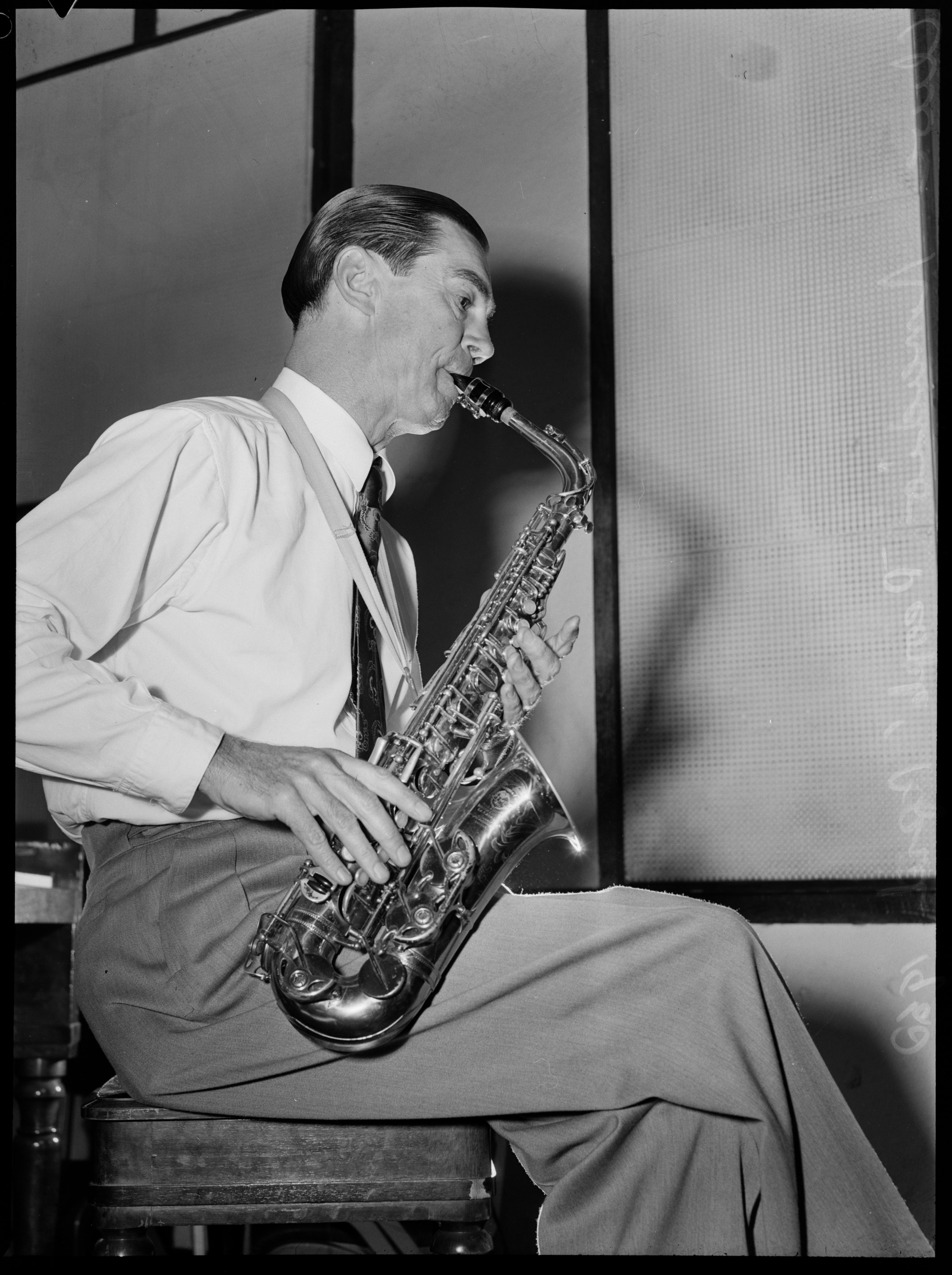
- Clive Amadio, April 1952

Background information
- Born: 28 February 1904; Darlington, New South Wales, Australia
- Died: 21 October 1983 (aged 79) Randwick, New South Wales, Australia
- Instrument(s): saxophone, clarinet

Clive Lyoff Amadio AM (28 February 1904 – 21 October 1983) was an Australian saxophonist and clarinettist. His brother was flautist Neville Amadio.

== Career ==
Clive Amadio was born 1904 in Darlington, New South Wales, and received early music lessons from his father. During his teens, he performed in ensembles providing soundtracks for silent films and toured as solo saxophonist on the Tivoli circuit.

Following World War II, his Clive Amadio Quintet was broadcast nationally by ABC Radio, proving to be extremely popular, and would remain on the air for almost twenty years.

He taught saxophone at the NSW State Conservatorium of Music (1942–45) as Professor of Clarinet and Saxophone, and in 1954 played for Queen Elizabeth II at a royal banquet.

His career with the ABC ended in 1958, and he ran a newsagent's shop until 1972. He taught again at the NSW State Conservatorium of Music, Newcastle branch between 1973 and 1980.

Clive Amadio died in 1983.

== Personal life ==
Clive Amadio was the son of New Zealand-born Harry Henville Taylor, and his Australian wife Florence Ada, née Beer. Flautist John Amadio was brother to Harry Taylor.

His brothers were all professional musicians. Neville Amadio played flute, Harry Amadio played French horn, and Leon Amadio was a trumpeter. Their cousin Len Amadio was concert manager for the ABC in Adelaide.

He married Gwendolen Marjorie Morgan on 25 August 1928, but filed for divorced the next year. He married Laurie Mary Walley on 2 October 1935, but later divorced, and Amadio married Olga Krasnik in 1967.

He was appointed a Member of the Order of Australia in 1980, in recognition of service to music.

The National Library of Australia hold a file on Clive Amadio, and the papers of the Amadio family including notes for Don Westlake's biography From me to you: the Life and Times of Clive Amadio and a telegram relating to Clive Amadio's Order of Australia.
