= Ben Fuller (producer) =

English-born Australian theatrical entrepreneur

Benjamin Fuller
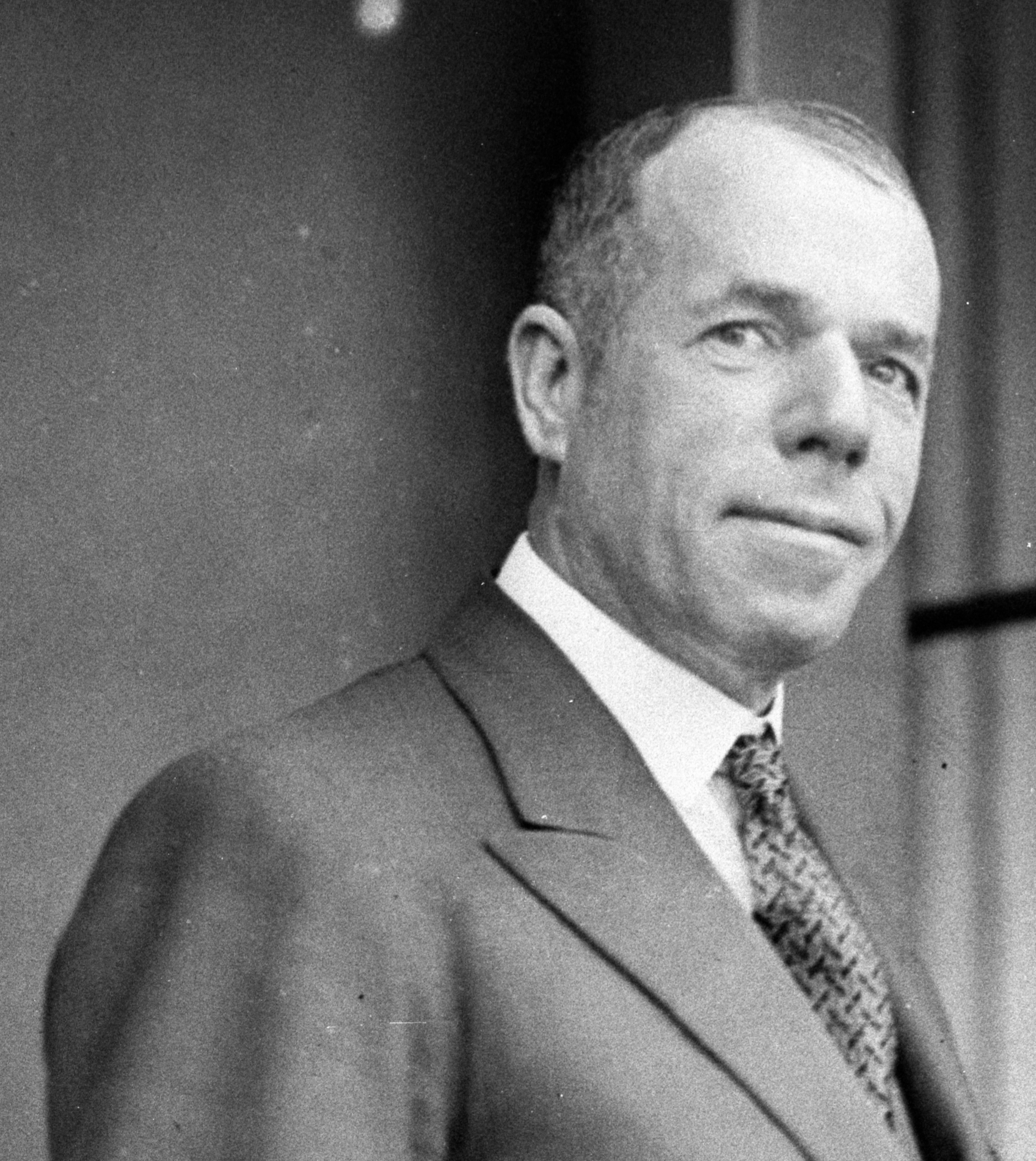
- Benjamin Fuller, Sydney, 1928
- Born: 20 March 1875; Shoreditch, London
- Died: 10 March 1952 (aged 76); St George's Hospital, London, England
- Occupations: theatrical entrepreneur; producer
- Works: The Bunyip
- Spouse(s): Jessie Elizabeth Burton (m. 1900–1903) Elizabeth Mary Lily Thomson (m. 1905–1952)
- Relatives: John Fuller (father); Lynn Rainbow (granddaughter)

Sir Benjamin John Fuller (20 March 1875 – 10 March 1952) was an English-born New Zealand and Australian theatrical entrepreneur, serving as a producer and manager, best known for establishing the franchise of theatre companies that bears his name. He came from a show business family: his father was the singer John Fuller and his brother John Fuller Jnr was also a theatre entrepreneur. He was the grandfather of Australian actress, arts patron and philanthropist Lynn Rainbow. His son Ben financed the film Captain Thunderbolt.

== Biography ==
Benjamin John Fuller was born on 20 March 1875 in Shoreditch, London, to John Fuller, snr, and Harriett Fuller, née Jones. Ben's father, a tenor, gave up his day job as a compositor when he was invited to join the songwriter Harry Hunter's Mohawk Minstrels in October 1881.

=== Early career ===
Fuller became interested in stage when, from December 1884 to February 1885, aged just 10, he appeared in a juvenile production of the Gilbert and Sullivan opera The Pirates of Penzance at the Savoy Theatre. Two years later he was a member of Montague Robey's Midget Minstrels and later joined Warwick Gray's Juvenile Opera Company.

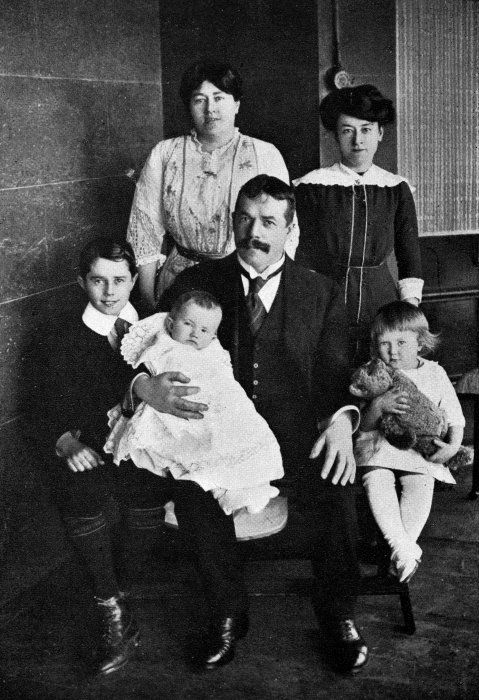
Benjamin John Fuller and family, 1913

In 1889, John Fuller Snr. accepted an invitation to tour Australia with the London Pavilion Company and arrived in Melbourne aboard the Cuzco on 3 August 1889. After the company disbanded in January 1890, John Fuller Snr. decided to stay in Australia as he could see great opportunities in the theatre business in both Australia and New Zealand. In July 1891 he was joined by his second wife Matilda Fuller, son John Fuller Jnr. and daughter Hettie Fuller in Melbourne, after their voyage aboard the Oratava.

== Theatre entrepreneur ==
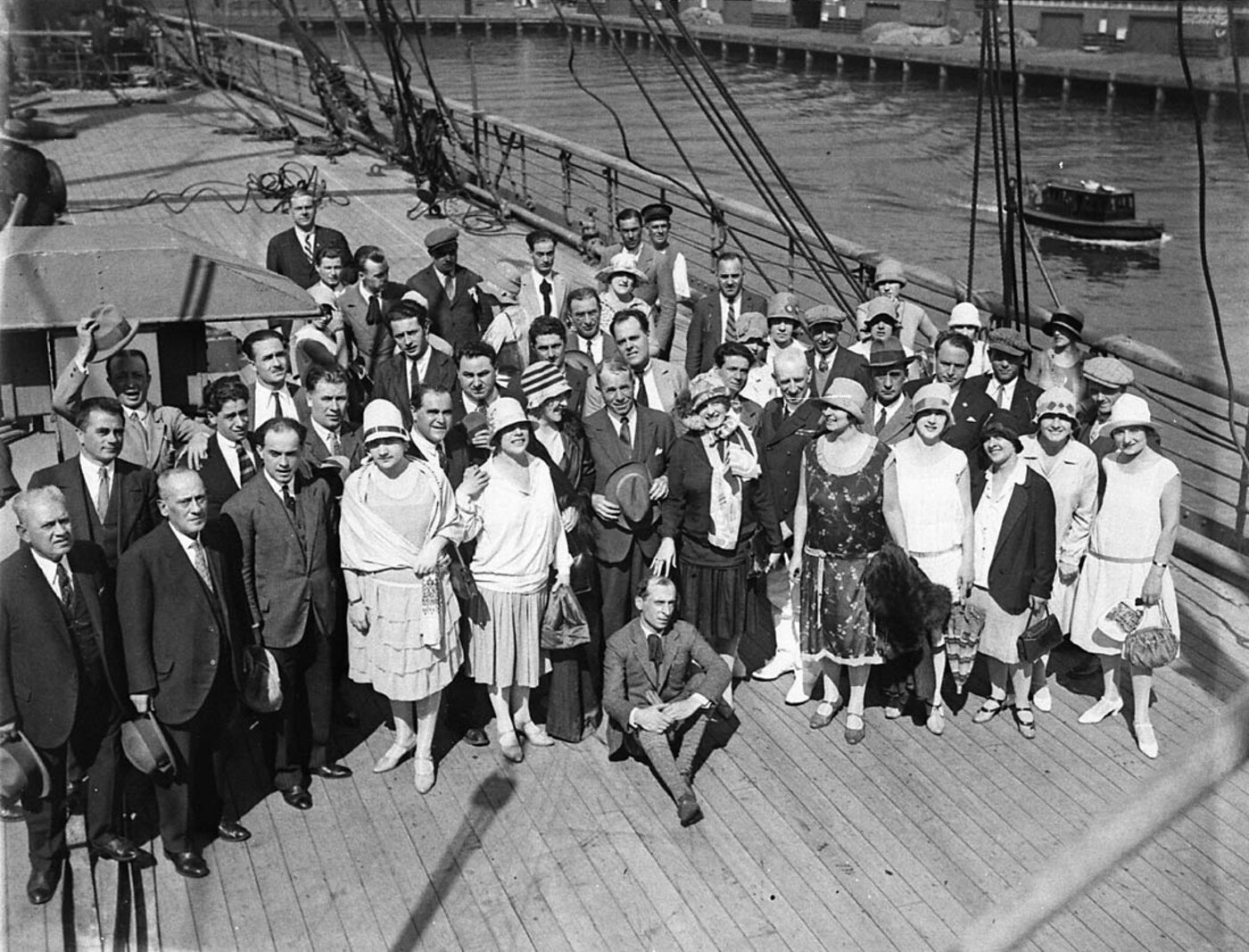
Sir Benjamin John Fuller posing with the Fuller-Gonsalez Grand Opera Company at the arrival of the company in Sydney in March 1928

After touring New Zealand with the Albu Sisters in 1893, John Fuller Snr. took out a short lease on the Auckland City Hall in September 1893 and started The People's Popular Concerts along with his son John Fuller Jnr. They then took their company and toured New Zealand main towns including Dunedin and Wellington. A year later they took out a lease on the St James Hall in Auckland. After touring England Ben eventually joined his father in Adelaide arriving aboard the Austral in February 1895, where John Fuller Snr. had been touring with The Continentals during a seasonal break from his Popular People's Concerts in New Zealand. Another son Walter and daughter Lydia also joined the family in Auckland in April 1895, where the Fullers continued to produce and sing in their People's Popular Concerts at the Auckland City Hall in New Zealand and later leasing theatres in Dunedin and Wellington.

Later John Fuller Snr. set up waxworks and lantern/myriorama shows with Walter as interlocutor, John Jnr. as electrinopticon and Ben as comedian. Later Ben managed the Alhambra Theatre in Dunedin while Walter Fuller managed their theatres in Christchurch and John Fuller Jnr. managed Fuller's Theatres in Wellington where John Jnr. also became a prominent Wellington City Councillor. John Fuller Snr. remained in Auckland managing the Fuller's Theatres until he stepped back from the business allowing his sons to take the helm by 1910.

On 6 October 1900 Ben Fuller married Jessie Elizabeth Burton, née McDonald, a widow; they had a son in 1902 but she died in May 1903. He married again, to Elizabeth Mary Lily Thomson on 8 November 1905. The Fullers continued to tour around New Zealand and extended their circuit to Australia, where they purchased James Brennan's vaudeville circuit (1912) and established the John Fuller & Sons Ltd (1914) operating the Ben. J. Fuller's Big Australasian Vaudeville Circuits (1915). Their first foray into operatic management was the tour of the popular Gonsalez Italian Grand Opera Company performing in Melbourne, Sydney and Wellington in the 1916/1917 seasons. A patriotic comedy musical, The Bunyip was a success. The five Gonsalez brothers opened a new tour in Sydney on 10 March 1928, billed as the Fuller-Gonsalez Grand Opera Company.

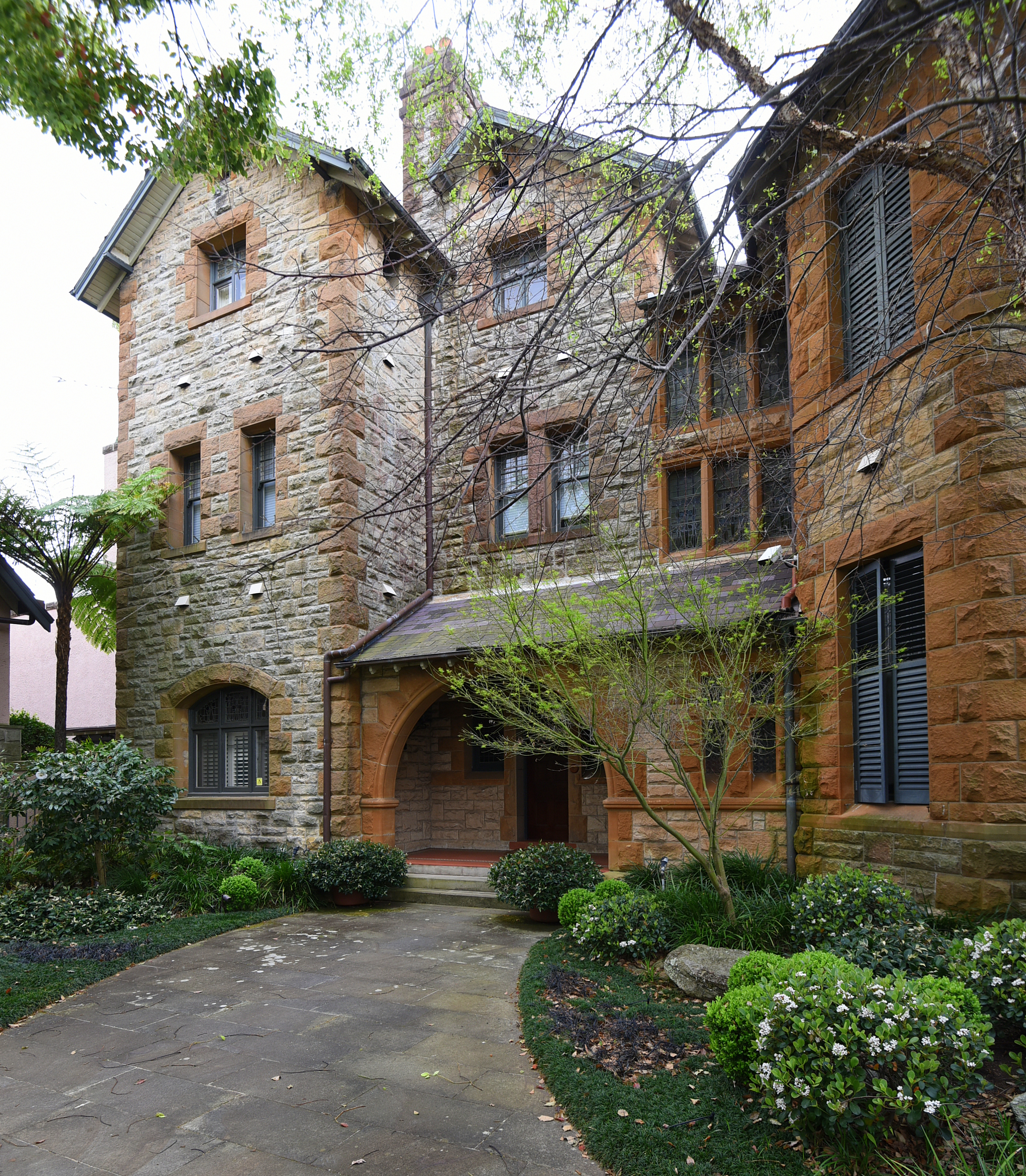
Ardenbraught, the Fuller home in Point Piper

Ben based himself in Sydney, where he acquired the house Ardenbraught in the suburb of Point Piper. In 1920 he donated £1000 to Vernon Treatt so that he could take up his Rhodes scholarship and he subsequently established the Fuller Trust for overseas training in agriculture. Knighted by George V in the King's 1921 Birthday Honours, he contested Sydney in the 1922 state elections as an independent without success, and was a Nationalist candidate in the federal election of that year.

In 1923 the Fullers partnered with Hugh J. Ward and focused on musical comedy. The family built the St James Theatre in Sydney, and survived the Depression by installing cinema apparatuses in their theatres. After the brothers divided their assets, Ben Fuller was governing director of Fullers' Theatres Ltd and attempted to establish an English language opera company without success. He had Florence Austral and Thea Phillips in the company and their operas included Il trovatore, Rigoletto, Faust, Lohengrin and Die Fledermaus. He was hopeful of help from the government after a season in Melbourne failed to show a profit. In 1935 the company was wound up. In partnership with Garnet H. Carroll from 1939, he jointly established the Carroll-Fuller Theatre Company Pty Ltd in 1946. He was chairman of the Howard Prison Reform League, vice-president of the Sydney Industrial Blind Institution, and president of the Australian Council for International Social Service.

From 1945 to 1947, he allowed his home Ardenbraught in Point Piper to be used by 280 officers and men from the Royal Netherlands Naval Air Force, who were operating from the flying boat base in Rose Bay. This fact is marked by a plaque outside the house. He died at St George's Hospital in London in 1952.
