= Elise Wiedermann =

Opera singer and voice teacher (1851–1922)

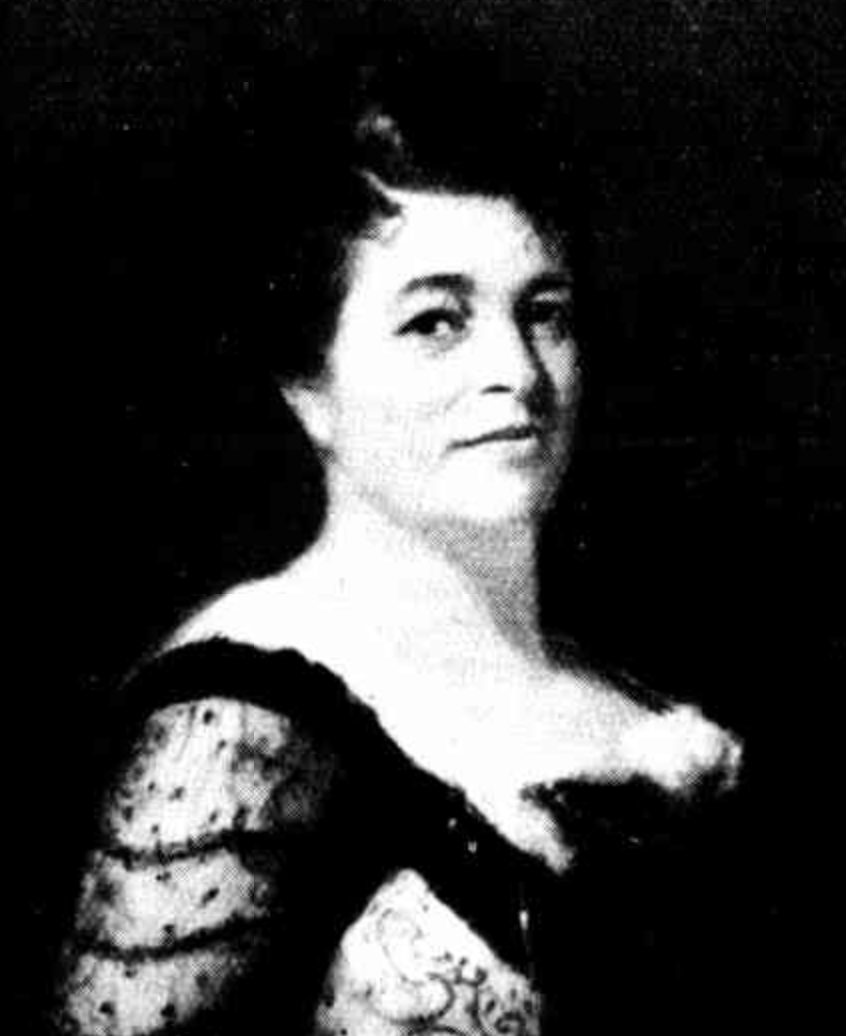

Background information
- Born: 31 August 1851; Vienna, Austria
- Died: 24 July 1922 (aged 70) Windsor, Victoria, Australia
- Genre: Opera
- Occupations: Soprano, singing teacher

Elise Wiedermann (31 August 1851 – 24 July 1922) was a Viennese-born soprano who performed and taught singing in Melbourne, Australia from 1883.

== Early life and education ==
Elise Wiedermann was born in Vienna, Austria on 31 August 1851 to Elise (née Aschinger) and Carl Wiedermann. She studied singing at the Vienna Conservatorium, where she was taught by Mathilde Marchesi and was awarded laureate in 1873.

== Career ==
Wiedermann's first professional performances were with the Komische Oper and Carltheater in Vienna, the latter under the baton of Franz von Suppé. She subsequently performed in Zürich in 1875 and then at the Court Theatre Braunschweig for five years.

She became engaged to Viennese-born Carl Pinschof in 1880. He migrated to Melbourne where she followed in 1883. The couple were married on 19 August 1883 at the Church of the Immaculate Conception in Hawthorn. After her marriage, the Austro-Hungarian government forced her to give up singing in public or for remuneration and she could perform at private events only.

She and her husband became patrons of music and art, supporting the Melbourne Conservatorium of Music founded by George Marshall-Hall and opening their home, "Studley Hall" in Kew for musical performances. Recognising the talent of Nellie Melba, Wiedemann provided her with a letter of introduction to her teacher, Mathilde Marchesi.

Her students included Florence Austral, Evelyn Scotney and Elsa Stralia.

== Death and legacy ==
Wiedermann died on 24 July 1922 at her home, "Lewisham", Lewisham Road, Windsor. Survived by her husband and three daughters, she was buried on 26 July in the Lutheran section of Booroondara Cemetery.

The chancellor of Melbourne University, Sir John MacFarland, unveiled a tablet in her memory in Melba Hall in 1923.
