= Tooronga =

Tooronga may refer to:

- Tooronga railway station
- Tooronga Village
