= Neville Amadio =

Australian flautist

Neville Francis Amadio AM MBE (15 February 1913 – 29 May 2006) was an Australian flautist who played with the Sydney Symphony Orchestra and its predecessors for over 50 years. The conductor Sir Charles Mackerras once said that Amadio was "without doubt, the greatest flautist the world produced in the 20th century".

== Early life and career ==
Amadio was born into a musical family in 1913. He studied at the Fort Street Boys' High School and the NSW State Conservatorium of Music (later known as the Sydney Conservatorium of Music). He was taught the flute by his uncle, the notable flautist John Amadio (1893–1964), whose second wife was the soprano Florence Austral.

== Musical career ==
In 1928, when he was only 14 years old, he started playing with the 2FC Broadcasting Orchestra, which had only eight members. Amadio said of his early days "We were expected to play virtually everything, from salon music to reduced versions of the 1812 Overture". By the time the 2FC Broadcasting Orchestra had become the ABC Symphony Orchestra in 1934, Amadio was principal flautist (at age 21), and he retained this position when the orchestra later became the Sydney Symphony Orchestra, until his retirement in 1978. He served 50 years with the orchestra in its various forms. Visiting conductors such as George Szell, Sir Thomas Beecham and Eugene Ormandy invited him to join their orchestras.

He also worked as a soloist in many concerts both in Australia and internationally including at the Royal Festival Hall in London. He was also a popular chamber musician, being a founding member of Musica Viva Australia and the Sydney Wind Quintet. He made numerous recordings both as a member of the Sydney Symphony Orchestra and with his chamber music groups. He was the first classical musician to play with a jazz band in Sydney. He was also the professor of flute at the NSW Conservatorium of Music for a number of years.

For his services to music, in 1969 he was made a Member of the Order of the British Empire (MBE), and in 1981 a Member of the Order of Australia (AM).

All of his brothers became professional musicians. Clive Amadio (1904–83) was a clarinettist and saxophonist who founded the Clive Amadio Quintet, and presented a Sunday evening radio program The Clive Amadio Half Hour for over ten years until 1958; Harry Amadio was a French horn player; and Leon Amadio was a trumpeter.

Neville Amadio died aged 93 on 29 May 2006, after a series of heart attacks.
