= Dolores Cambridge =

Australian soprano (1937–2024)

Dolores Cambridge (26 April 1937 – 7 June 2024) was an Australian soprano. She performed in opera in Australia, England, and Germany.

== Life and career ==
Cambridge left Sydney to study opera in London at the Guildhall School of Music and Drama.

After returning to Australia, she performed in operas with Opera Australia at the Sydney Opera House during the 1970s, initially as an understudy until 1975. That year Joan Carden was to perform as Amelia in Giuseppe Verdi's Simon Boccanegra, with Cambridge to take over later in the season. But when Carden became ill, this was reversed, and Cambridge opened instead.

She performed the opera Aida with the Royal Christchurch Music Society and Christchurch Symphony Orchestra in New Zealand in 1976, and then with Opera Australia at the Sydney Opera House in 1977, as part of the first Sydney Festival.

Throughout the 1970s she appeared in multiple operas at the Sydney Opera House, as well as touring performances with Opera Australia.

Between 1985 and 1992, she was a Vocal Teacher at the Sydney Conservatorium of Music, and examined students for entry and their final exams. In 2003 she was adjudicator for the National Operatic Aria Award, and again in 2006.

Cambridge died in Sydney on 7 June 2024, at the age of 87.

== Performances ==
- 1973 - War and Peace, at the Sydney Opera House
- 1973 - The Magic Flute, at the Sydney Opera House
- 1973 - Il trittico, at the Sydney Opera House
- 1974 - Tosca, at the Sydney Opera House
- 1974 - Così fan tutte, at the Sydney Opera House
- 1974 - Don Giovanni, at the Sydney Opera House
- 1975 - Simon Boccanegra, at the Sydney Opera House
- 1975 - Ariadne auf Naxos, at the Sydney Opera House
- 1975 - The Magic Flute, at the Sydney Opera House
- 1976 - Carmen, at the Sydney Opera House
- 1977 - Aida, at the Sydney Opera House
- 1977 - Macbeth, at the Sydney Opera House
- 1978 - The Death of Captain Cook, at Sydney Town Hall
- 1987 - St Matthew Passion, at St Andrew's Cathedral, Sydney
