= John Fuller (singer) =

New Zealand singer and theatrical company manager

- Born: 26 June 1850; Shoreditch, London, England, United Kingdom
- Died: 9 May 1923 (aged 72); Auckland, New Zealand
- Occupations: Singer; theatre company manager
- Known for: Fullers Vaudeville Circuit
- Relatives: Sir Benjamin Fuller (son)

John Fuller (26 June 1850 – 9 May 1923) was an English-born New Zealand singer and theatrical company manager. Manager and producer Ben Fuller was his son. The Fuller family name became synonymous with entertainment in New Zealand, especially vaudeville.

== Personal life ==
John Fuller was born in Shoreditch, London, the son of Benjamin Richard Fuller (1824–1903) and Mary Walter (1821–1875). He was trained as a printer's compositor by day but by night he often used to sing at Collins Music Hall, Islington Green and later with the Moore and Burgess Minstrels at St James' Hall, Picadilly.

He married Harriett Annie Jones on 7 October 1871 at St Matthew's Church, Islington, London and they had five children, Walter Fuller (1872–1934), Benjamin John Fuller (1875–1952), Lydia Fuller (1876–1969), Harriet Annie Fuller (1878–1963) and John Fuller Jnr. (1879–1959). John Fuller Snr's wife Harriett Annie Fuller died on 29 April 1887 of typhoid fever leaving him with five young children under the age of thirteen to bring up. Just over a year later John Fuller Snr. remarried to Emily Matilda Cryer on 22 July 1888 at St Ann's, Tottenham, London.

John Fuller and his second wife Matilda, known fondly as Ma to the family had two children, May Emily Victoria Fuller (1892–1855) who was born in Melbourne, Australia and Raymond Gerald Fuller (1898–1937) who was born in Auckland New Zealand.

== Career ==
John Fuller Sr. was a singer with a tenor voice who finally gave up his day job as a compositor when he was invited to join the songwriter Harry Hunter's Mohawk Minstrels of the Agricultural Hall, Islington, in October 1881. Harry Hunter wrote John Fuller Sr.'s signature song "Geraldine", which was composed by W.C. Levy. In 1889, John Fuller Sr. accepted an invitation to tour Australia with the London Pavilion Company and arrived in Melbourne aboard the Cuzco on 3 August 1889. However, John Fuller Snr. was left in Sydney, out of pocket and without a return ticket to London after the London Pavilion Company failed financially in January 1890.

After the company disbanded John Fuller Sr. decided to stay in Australia as he could see great opportunities in the theatre business in both Australia and New Zealand. In July 1891 he was joined by his second wife Matilda Fuller, son John Fuller Jnr. and daughter Hettie Fuller in Melbourne, after their voyage aboard the Oratava. After touring New Zealand with the Albu Sisters in 1893, John Fuller Snr. opportunely took out a short lease on the Auckland City Hall in September 1893 and started The People's Popular Concerts along with his son John Fuller Jnr., they then took their Company and toured New Zealand's main townships including Dunedin and Wellington, drawing great crowds and encores everywhere they went. A year later they took out a lease on the St James Hall in Auckland and were well on their way to becoming a household name in New Zealand.

After touring England, Ben Fuller, later Sir Benjamin Fuller, eventually joined his father in Adelaide after arriving aboard the Austral in February 1895, where John Fuller Snr. had been touring with The Continentals during a seasonal break from his Popular People's Concerts in Auckland in New Zealand. Another son Walter and daughter Lydia boarded the Kaikoura, and joined the family in Auckland, arriving in April 1895. Now John Fuller had his entire family together and the Fullers continued to produce, promote, entertain and sing in their People's Popular Concerts at the Auckland City Hall in New Zealand, later leasing theatres in Dunedin and Wellington.

Walter Fuller was musically gifted as a vocalist and conductor as well as playing by ear several musical instruments including the organ and mandolin. Ben Fuller had also learned to play the piano and the double bass by ear. A few years later John Fuller Snr. set up the waxworks and lantern/myriorama shows with Walter as interlocutor, John Jr. as electrinopticon and Ben as comedian. Later Ben managed the Alhambra Theatre in Dunedin, whilst Walter Fuller managed their theatres in Christchurch and John Fuller Jnr. managed Fuller's Theatres in Wellington where John Jnr. also became a prominent Wellington City Councillor. John Fuller Snr. remained in Auckland managing the Fuller's Theatres until he stepped back from the business allowing his sons to take the helm by 1910.

John Fuller Snr. continued his singing career in Auckland, often appearing on the stage of his own theatres, by popular demand, until his retirement in 1915. He was recognised as one of New Zealand's most popular entertainers and was always encored to sing some of his most famous songs, which included the all-time favourite, "Geraldine" as well as "Does your Heart Beat True to Me, Wait Till the Clouds Roll by Jennie, We Don't Know how we Love them Till we Lose Them, The Anchor's Weighed, Jennie with the Light Brown Hair and Sally in our Alley".

John Fuller died in Auckland on 9 May 1923, aged 72 years, and was buried at Auckland General Cemetery, Onehunga.
