= John Lemmone =

Australian flautist and composer

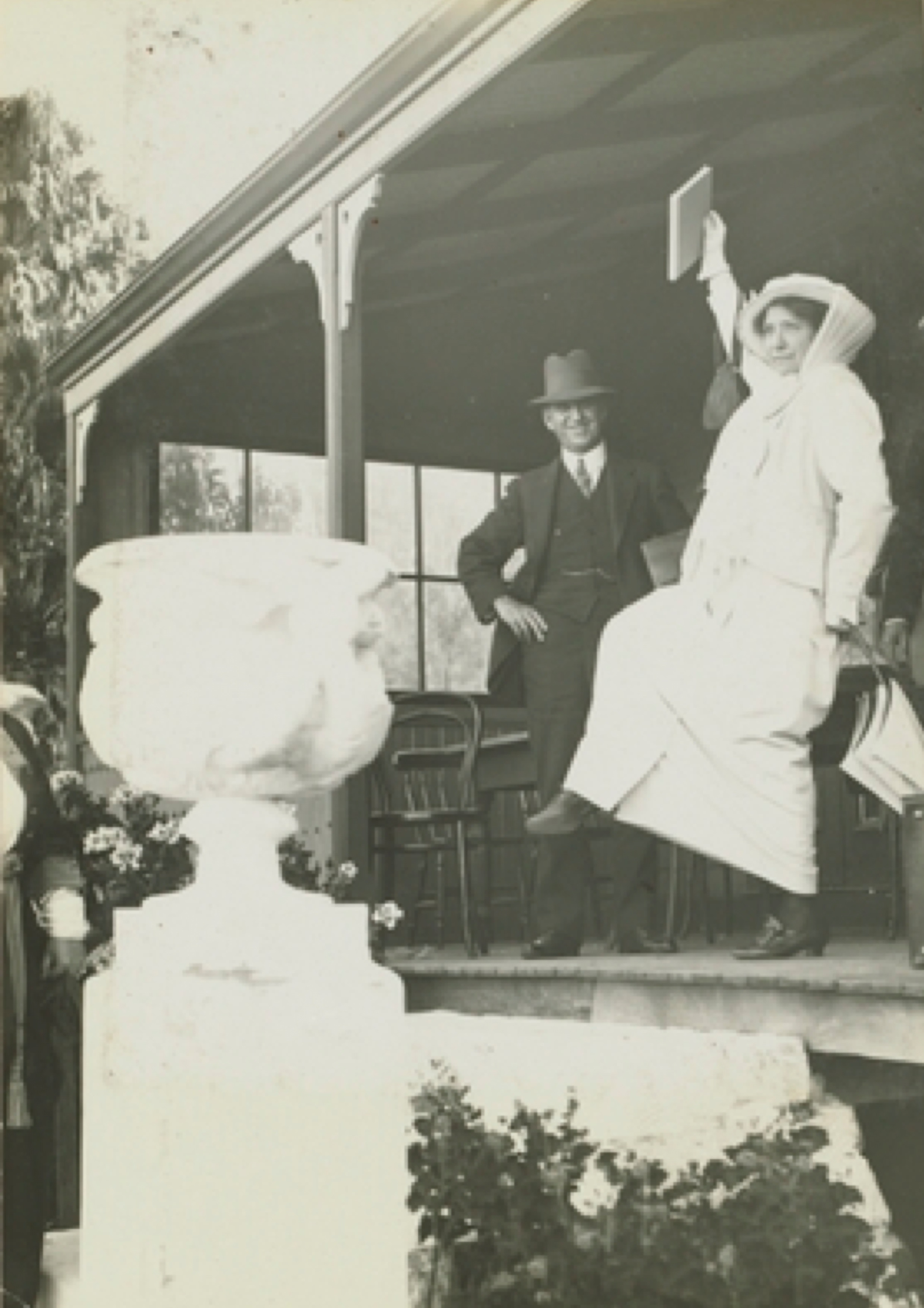
- John Lemmone and Nellie Melba at Bilgola, 23 September 1914.

Background information
- Born: 22 June 1861; Ballarat, Victoria, Australia
- Died: 16 August 1949 (aged 88) Darlinghurst, New South Wales, Australia
- Genres: Classical
- Occupations: Soloist, accompanist
- Instrument: Flute

John Lemmone (22 June 1861 – 16 August 1949) was an Australian flute player and composer who was largely self-taught and who at the age of 12, paid for his first flute with gold he had panned himself on the goldfields at Ballarat. He had an international career as a soloist, and accompanied well-known singers such as Adelina Patti, Nellie Melba and Amy Sherwin, the pianist Ignacy Jan Paderewski, and the violinist Pablo de Sarasate. Later in his career he became Nellie Melba's manager.

== Early life ==
Lemmone was born in Ballarat to a Greek immigrant, John Lemon (originally Lamoni) and his English-born wife Mary. It was a musical family and the boy learned tin whistle before progressing to fife, playing in the local Golden City drum and fife band. By the age of 12 he had found enough gold on the Ballarat goldfields to buy his own flute.

The next year, the family moved to Melbourne and as a teenager, Lemmone performed with a number of Melbourne theatre orchestras, including as principal flute with Lyster's Royal Italian Opera Company. In 1884 he made his debut as a soloist in a benefit concert for the local musician Carl Elsässer, who had suffered a stroke. A young singer by the name of Helen Mitchell (later Nellie Melba), who was later to form a close professional association with Lemmone, sang at the same concert.

== International career ==
In 1887 and 1889, having changed his name, Lemmone toured Australia and Asia with soprano Amy Sherwin. He married Isabella Stewart in 1889 and over the next few years he again toured, with singers Janet Patey, Allan James Foley and Charles Santley, and violinist Pablo de Sarasate.

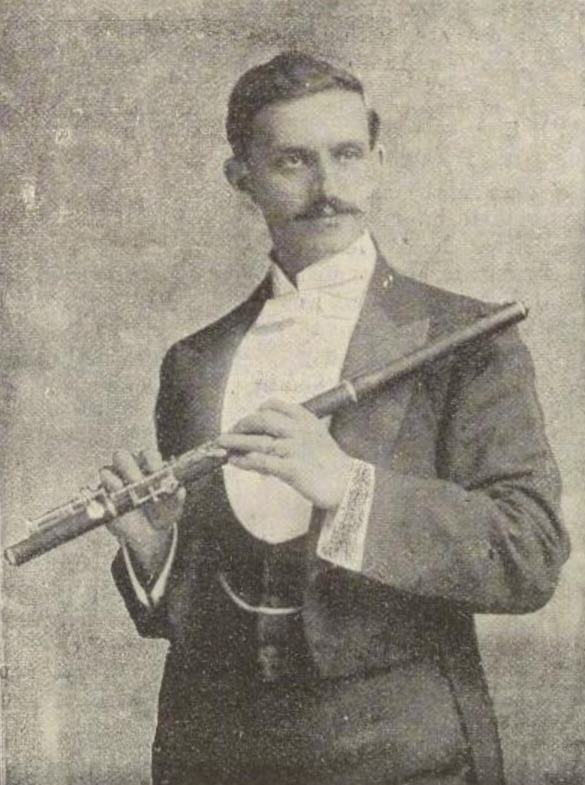
Lemmone in 1897

Lemmone renewed his acquaintance with Nellie Melba in London in 1894. By this time, Melba was very well known in Europe, having sung at Covent Garden in 1888 and the Metropolitan Opera in 1893, and his contact with her further advanced his career. He accompanied her with flute obbligatos at fashionable social gatherings and at Queen's Hall, London. He also performed with Adelina Patti in Albert Hall, toured with her and in 1896 with Amy Sherwin in South Africa.

When he returned to Australia in 1897, he changed career path and began work as a manager for international artists, including pianists Mark Hambourg and Paderewski as well as Melba. He also selected internationally known performers for the 1911 J. C. Williamson opera season. He continued to perform, however. At a reception held for him after his return from Europe, he performed so well that a critique in The Sydney Morning Herald reported:

... the varying moods of the dreamy undulating motions of the Nautch girl's dance or the swirling rhythm of the Hungarian dance, the piquant action of the mazurka, the majestic sweep of a Russian hymn, the delightful trill of the nightingale, and the restless fluttering of the butterfly in a garden of roses are delineated by Mr Lemmone with a sweetness of expression and accuracy of tone, even in the most difficult bravura passages, that cannot fail to charm the hearer.

Lemmone continued to perform as a soloist and even as late as 1938, he performed on radio. However, management was his principal career and during the years of the First World War, he organised concerts in both Australia and England to raise money for the war effort, although taking no fee.

His wife Isabella having died on 11 June 1943, Lemmone remarried on 28 September of the same year. In 1949, he died at Darlinghurst in Sydney, aged 88 years.

== Radcliff flute ==
External audio
- John Lemmoné, Ada Sassoli (harp) and Maurice Lafarge (piano) playing the first movement from Mozart's Concerto for Harp and Flute C major, K 299 in 1910 Here on DAHR

Like John Amadio after him, Lemmone played a Radcliff flute that sounded like a Boehm flute but which had a different fingering system. When he died, his flute came into the possession of his friend and onetime student, the flautist and educator Victor McMahon. In turn, McMahon gave the flute to the National Film and Sound Archive in 1986. It is now held at the Arts Centre Melbourne, Performing Arts Collection.
