= St Kevin's College, Melbourne =

Catholic school in Melbourne, Australia

St Kevin's College

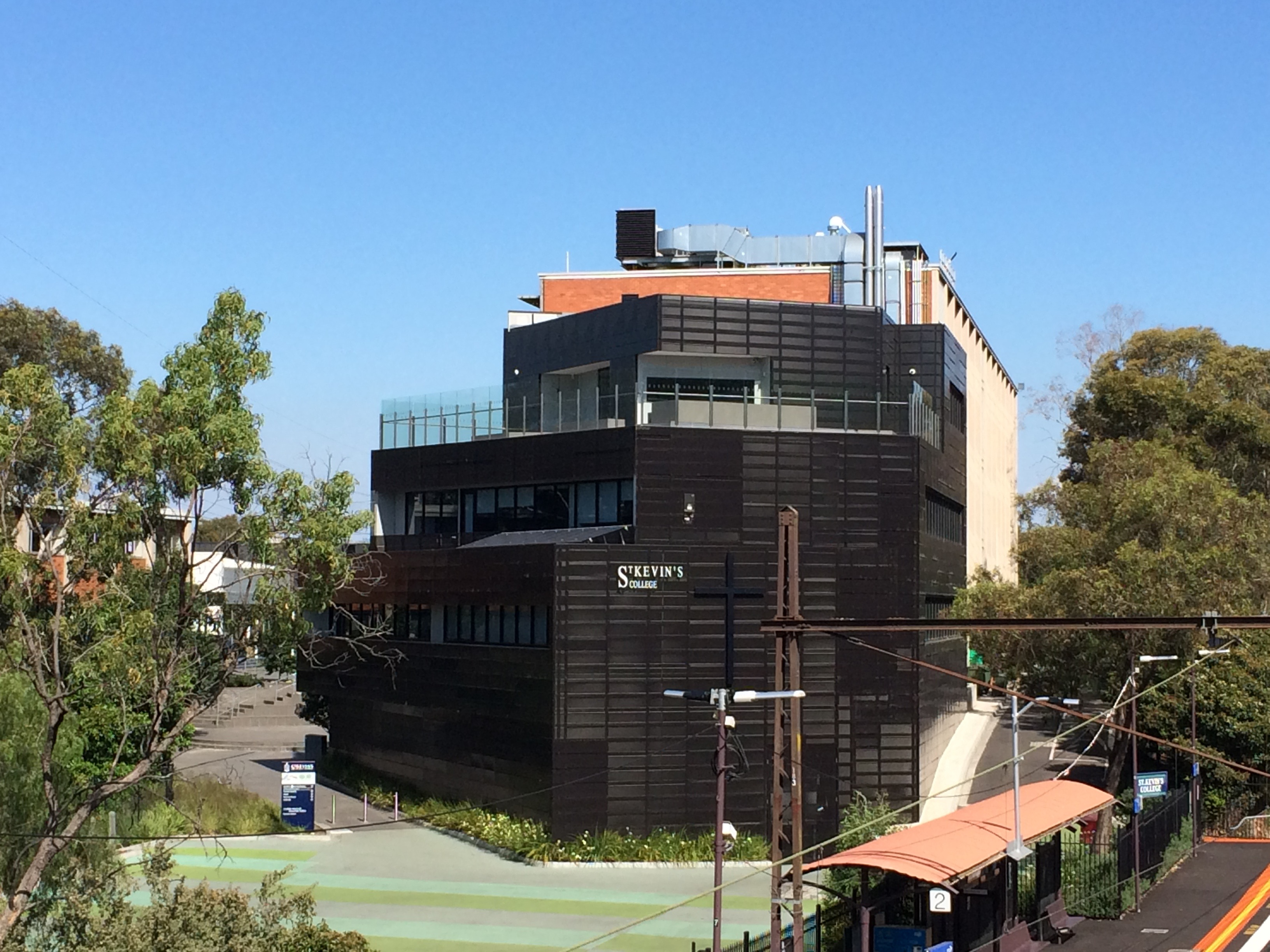
- St Kevin's College, Toorak, in 2015

Location
- 31 Moonga Road; Toorak, Melbourne, Victoria; Australia; 37°50′10″S 145°1′29″E

Information
- Type: private primary and secondary school, Christian school
- Motto: Latin: Omnia Pro Deo (All for God)
- Religious affiliation: Catholicism
- Denomination: Congregation of Christian Brothers
- Established: 1918; 108 years ago
- Founder: Congregation of Christian Brothers
- Oversight: Archdiocese of Melbourne
- Trust: Edmund Rice Education Australia
- Principal: Deborah M Barker
- Gender: Boys
- Enrolment: 2,180 (K–12)
- Houses: Cusack; Kenny; Kearney; Purton; McCarthy; Rahill
- Colours: Green, gold and blue
- Affiliations: Associated Public Schools of Victoria; International Boys' Schools Coalition; Association of Heads of Independent Schools of Australia
- Alumni: St. Kevin's Old Collegians
- Website: www.stkevins.vic.edu.au

St Kevin's College is a private Catholic primary and secondary school for boys located in Melbourne, Victoria, Australia. The college has three campuses, two of which are in the suburb of Toorak, the third in Richmond. The school also has playing fields located behind Stockland Tooronga. The school formerly owned a campsite 'Silver Creek' in the town of Flowerdale which was completely destroyed by the Black Saturday bushfires.

St Kevin's was founded in 1918 by the Christian Brothers and is a member of the Associated Public Schools of Victoria. St Kevin's overlooks Gardiners Creek, a tributary that runs into the Yarra River, with Scotch College on the opposite side. The college has a long-standing tradition with the historic St. Patrick's Cathedral and is responsible for educating their choir boys.

The Archdiocese of Melbourne provides oversight of St Kevin's, and as of December 1 2023 it's governance is held by an independent body with its own board, following the transfer of assets and administration from the Trustees of Edmund Rice Education Australia (TEREA).

== History ==
The school was established in 1918 on the corner of Albert St and Eades St, East Melbourne, by the Christian Brothers as St Kevin's Central College with the purpose of being a school where the "brainy boys" of the other Christian Brothers Schools could further their education. In 1932, the school was moved to the corner of St George and Orrong Roads, Toorak. Property in Heyington was purchased and developed into playing fields for the use of all Christian Brothers Schools. This location is now the Senior School Campus, housing Years 7 to 8, and Years 10 through to Year 12, in a vertical house system.

The Heyington Campus, which is next to the Glen Waverley railway line, was built in 1960, its main feature being the Kearney Building.

The Lansell Road property was opened in 1972, and that same year the Orrong Road property was sold.

In 1982, the K.C. Smith building was constructed for the middle school years on the Senior Campus.

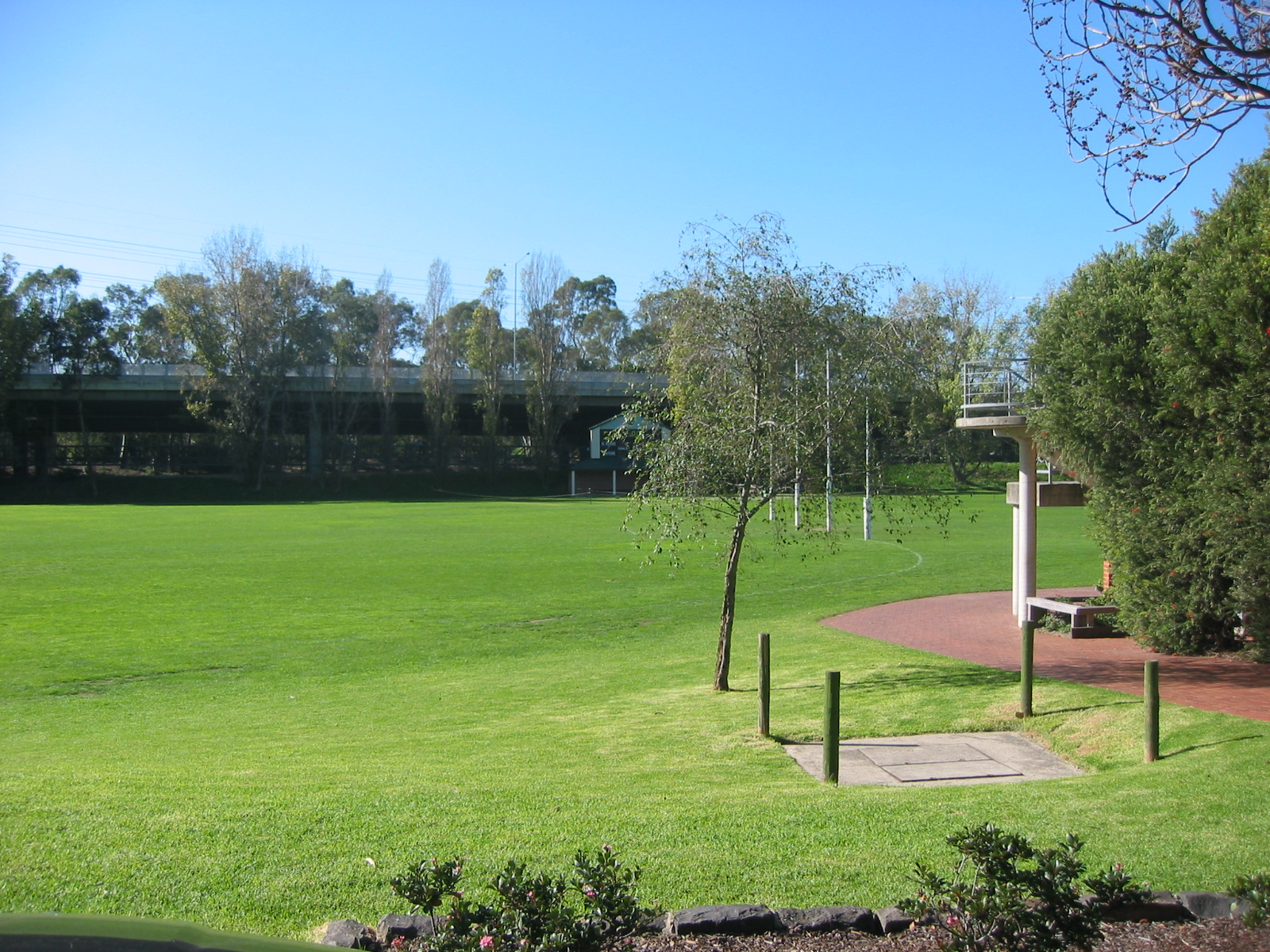
Oval Number 1: Scoreboard in the background, and the Pavilion to the right

In 1990, the Pavilion was opened. Since its opening, the Pavilion has flooded twice, both in 2005. Ovals 1 and 2 were completely submerged.

The Cummins Building was refurbished in 1997, and currently houses the creative arts precinct, which includes arts, drama, music and artistic works. The McCarthy Building was opened that year, housing art studios, the campus library and the Administration Block.

The Lansell Road property is now home to the Glendalough Campus, and in 1999 became a full primary school, housing Prep to Year 6 students. Also in 1999, Year 9 students moved from the Senior Campus to a dedicated campus named Waterford in Richmond. Waterford currently resides in the former Vaucluse College FCJ site in Richmond. 1999 saw a major change in the structure of the school, with the introduction of the House System for Years 10 to 12. This saw the desegregation of year levels and their amalgamation into houses with five tutor groups comprising Year 10, Year 11 and Year 12 boys, accompanied by a tutor. Previously, boys were organised by year levels, and supervised by Year Level Coordinators, somewhat similar to the current system found in the Middle School (Years 7 to 9).

In March 2006, a $16 million indoor pool, gym and sports facility, the Wilding Centre, was blessed by Cardinal George Pell and opened for the students.

In 2009, the Godfrey Building was opened.

In 2010, the Boyd Egan Hall was opened at Glendalough and substantial floods filled the school's ovals and damaged the Fraser Tennis Courts.

In 2011, work began on a three-storey $14 million Science Wing, located adjacent to Heyington railway station at the end of the Kearney Building.

In 2013, the Kearney West Building was officially opened. The building contains science labs and woodwork rooms, which are used for senior classes.

In 2014, the McMahon Music Centre was opened at Glendalough and the remaining laboratories in the Kearney Building were refurbished. Music and drama facilities in the Cummins Building were modernised as well.

In 2017, the Tooronga Fields Campus was opened as the St Kevin's offsite sports ground.

2018 saw St Kevin's College celebrate its centenary year. A special 100-year logo was created and was used throughout the school year as well as on ties and a badge that the students received. Several celebrations were conducted, including a free lunch provided by the school, intended to pay homage to the older traditions of the College chartering a train from Heyington railway station to other parts of Melbourne for a school picnic. Special events such as "The Great Debate", featuring generations of St Kevin's old boys, took place, and a limited-edition 100-year history of the college was published for students and staff.

== Campuses ==
St Kevin's College has five campuses:

- Glendalough – The St Kevin's College Junior School in Lansell Road, Toorak, is named after the location of the St Kevin's Monastery in Ireland. It houses students from Prep to Year 6.
- Heyington – In 1932, the current site of the Heyington Campus was purchased and at the time was used for playing fields. It now serves as the main academic campus for Years 7, 8, 10, 11 and 12.
- Waterford – Purchased by St Kevin's College in the early 2000s for the Year 9 campus and situated on Richmond Hill, it occupies the facilities of the former Vaucluse College.
- St Peter's – An Early Learning Centre that is a co-venture with Loreto Mandeville Hall, this site is home to kindergarten students.
- Tooronga – Opened on 17 June 2017 at a cost of $38 million, the Tooronga Fields Campus is a sports complex which consists of three soccer pitches as well as an Australian Rules oval. There are also 12 tennis courts that can be used as a hockey pitch. The site also includes a 200-metre athletics track with high jump and long jump training areas as well as 12 cricket nets, two pavilions containing unisex change rooms, viewing areas, half a basketball court and a function centre.

== Houses ==
The Houses for the Senior (Years 10 to 12) and Middle (Years 7 to 8) Schools are named after Christian Brothers associated with the college. They are:

St Kevin's College – Middle and Senior School Houses
House	Colour	Established	Named after	Motto
Cusack		1999	J. R. Cusack c.f.c.; Teacher of Modern and Ancient History and Languages, 1919–1927 and 1931–1941	N/A
Kearney		1999	J. A. Kearney c.f.c.; Headmaster, 1930–1934	First in Friendship and Everything Else; (note: unofficial motto adopted by student body)
Kenny		1999	J. F. Kenny c.f.c.; Science Master, 1918–1945	N/A
McCarthy		2008	F. I. McCarthy c.f.c.; Headmaster, 1977	Latin: Audere et Vincere; (Venture and Conquer)
Purton		1999	D. G. Purton c.f.c.; Headmaster, 1941–1943	N/A
Rahill		2010	P. A. Rahill c.f.c.; Teacher of English and Literature, 1927–1929 and 1935–1949	Latin: Veritas Omnia Vincit; (Truth Conquers All)

The original 'Foundation' Houses are Cusack, Kearney, Kenny and Purton. These Houses are located in their original areas in the Kearney Building. The 'Extension' Houses are McCarthy and Rahill, added to extend the capacity of the House system in their years of establishment. McCarthy House occupies the former Brothers' Quarters in the Cummins Building, while Rahill House occupies a purpose-built area in the Godfrey Building.

Boys are assigned their House at their entry point into St Kevin's College, however during Years 7 to 9, they primarily serve as a means of organisation for co-curricular competitions such as House Swimming, House Athletics and House Sports.

== Curriculum ==
St Kevin's College offers its Years 11 and 12 students the Victorian Certificate of Education (VCE), the main assessment program which ranks the students in the state.

The class of 2009 were the highest-performing academic group in the history of the modern VCE for St Kevin's College, making St Kevin's the top-performing, non-selective, all boys, Catholic and Associated Public Schools of Victoria-member school in 2009. 33 per cent of study scores were 40 or over, and 14 perfect scores were achieved across 10 subjects.

St Kevin's College VCE results 2011–2021
Year	Rank	Median study score	Scores of 40+ (%)	Cohort size
2011	14	31	23.3	325
2012	▼16	36	▲28.1	354
2013	▼21	36	▼27.1	362
2014	▼34	35	▼22.1	358
2015	▲13	36	▲29.3	346
2016	▼21	35	▼27.1	360
2017	▲5	37	▲30.8	371
2018	▼7	36	▼30.2	358
2019	▼14	36	▼27.5	350
2020	▼19	35	▼25.9	356
2021	▼24	35	▼22	378
2022	▲23	35	▲24	351
2023	23	35	24	358
2024	▼25	35	▼23.7	379
2025	▲22	35	▼23.6	392

== Publications ==
The English curriculum at St Kevin's allows for boys to develop their skills in the communication of ideas and is put into practice through the numerous publications that can be found in the college, each of which is aimed towards a certain audience, and has its own individual purpose.

- Senior School Newsletter – distributed weekly during semesters to parents, students, staff, members of the SKC Community (Years 7 to 12)
- Junior School Newsletter – distributed weekly during semesters to parents, students, staff, members of the SKC Community (Prep to Year 6)
- Omnia – magazine issued once per school term to parents, students, staff, members of the SKC Community, alumni, prospective parents, prospective students (Prep to Year 12)
- The Waterford Chronicle – student run newspaper issued once per school term to students and teachers (Year 9) – Now defunct
- The Purtonian – student run newspaper issued twice a term to students and teachers in Purton House (Years 10 to 12)
- The Kenny Post – student run newspaper issued to students and teachers in Kenny House (Years 10 to 12)
- The Kearney Magazine – student run newspaper issued to students and teachers in Kearney house (Years 10 to 12)
- The Cusackian – student run newspaper issued to students and teachers in Cusack house (Years 10 to 12)

== Extracurricular activities ==
The school has a number of extracurricular activities.

=== Debating and public speaking ===
St Kevin's competes in the Debaters Association of Victoria Schools competition, and the Heyington Campus is the host venue for the Toorak regional competition. Five debates are held each year, and St Kevin's teams debate against other Melbourne schools on various current interest topics. St Kevin's participates in a range of other debating and public speaking tournaments, including those organised by Rotary, the RSL, UNYA and as of 2011, the WIDPSC, with one student competing representing Australia, and recording 8th place.

=== Sport ===
St Kevin's College is a member of the Associated Public Schools of Victoria. The college's teams take part in a wide range of sports at different levels of achievement. In 2009, the College won the soccer, Australian rules football and rugby premierships – the first time this was achieved in APS history. The College was formerly a member of the Associated Catholic Colleges from 1940 to 1957.

==== APS Premierships ====
St Kevin's College has won the following APS premierships:

- Athletics (11) – 2006, 2007, 2008, 2011, 2012, 2013, 2014, 2015, 2017, 2018, 2019
- Badminton (4) – 2003, 2004, 2009, 2010
- Basketball (4) – 2001, 2007, 2011, 2018
- Cricket (7) – 1989, 1991, 1992, 2001, 2013, 2015, 2025
- Cross Country (8) – 2006, 2007, 2008, 2010, 2011, 2012, 2013, 2019
- Diving (10) – 2014, 2015, 2016, 2017, 2018, 2019, 2020, 2022, 2023, 2024
- Football (4) – 1997, 2009, 2011, 2012
- Futsal (4) – 2010, 2011, 2012, 2018
- Lawn Bowls (3) - 2020, 2023, 2024
- Soccer (2) – 2000, 2009
- Swimming & Diving* (5) – 2009, 2010, 2011, 2012, 2013
- Swimming (6) – 2016, 2021, 2022, 2023, 2024, 2025
- Tennis (8) – 1990, 1991, 1993, 1994, 1996, 2011, 2017, 2018

*From 1998 until 2013, swimming and diving events were tallied to be awarded as a single premiership.

=== Theatre and drama ===
St Kevin's has a theatre department and each year produces a number of plays, musicals and operas. A relationship between several different girls' schools has been established to enhance the co-curricular dramatic arts program.

=== Aviation ===
St Kevin's College offers an aviation program to its students. The program has been commended by aviators and industry experts, including Nancy Bird Walton.

== Coat of arms, crest and motto ==
The current school crest was adopted by Kearney in 1933. The crest bears:

- The Celtic Cross, signifying Irish heritage, in the top left quadrant
- A single star, representing the Star of Knowledge, in the top right quadrant
- The Southern Cross, representing Australia, in the bottom left quadrant
- A book with the Greek Letters Alpha and Omega scribed, symbolising God is all from beginning to end, in the bottom right quadrant

The school's motto is, in Latin, Omnia Pro Deo, meaning 'All for God' or transliterated means 'All things for God'. This is taken from a letter of St Paul.

=== Touchstones ===
As a member school of Edmund Rice Education Australia, St Kevin's has adopted the following touchstones which can be found on display around the several campuses and on the inside covers of school diaries. The touchstones are:

- Liberating Education
- Gospel Spirituality
- Inclusive Community
- Justice and Solidarity

These touchstones have also been adopted by other Edmund Rice Education Australia schools in a similar fashion to St Kevin's College.

== Controversy ==
=== Student sexism ===
On 21 October 2019, a viral video which showed some students performing a sexist chant while on public transport to an inter-school athletics event was made public. Following the resultant media furore, a public apology from Headmaster Stephen Russell was issued in a letter sent to all parents the following day. In this apology, Headmaster Russell denounced the students' "misogynistic" behaviour as "offensive". Ten students were reportedly suspended with the possibility of expulsion. Shortly thereafter, a second video was released in which three Year 12 students performed the same sexist chant in public only a few hours after the publication of the first video. The ABC further revealed that in 2018 a group of students made a derogatory rap song about female students from another school. Russell again condemned the students' behaviour as "foolish and reckless" and acknowledged that the college's cultural problems were "more widespread than [he] understood".

=== Mishandling of child abuse ===
In February 2020, it was reported that Stephen Russell wrote a character reference for Peter Kehoe, a non-staff athletics coach accused of grooming a St Kevin's student while under the school's employ. Kehoe was subsequently convicted and sentenced to a community corrections order and placed on the sex offenders register for eight years. The victim settled a civil claim with the school in August 2019. Amid calls to resign, Russell responded by suggesting that Kehoe was a "never a member of staff" and expressed his remorse for providing Kehoe a character reference, stating: "I would not do it again". Victorian Premier Daniel Andrews said that Russell's response was "just not on" and suggested that Russell would have been removed from his position had he been the principal of a government school.

On 19 February, Russell resigned from the school and dean of sport, Luke Travers, was stood down pending further investigation. Later the same day, John Crowley, principal of St Patrick's College in Ballarat, was appointed as the acting Headmaster of St Kevin's. The employment of Simon Parris, a mathematics teacher, was "concluded" from the Toorak school in late February amid a series of staff removals over a child grooming scandal; and was subsequently suspended from teaching. Janet Canny, a former deputy principal, stepped aside after court action was lodged against her over a complaint alleging breaches of mandatory reporting, and Gary Jones, a teacher, had his employment "concluded". At least six staff members were stood aside or left the school since Russell resigned.

== Notable alumni ==
=== Clergy ===
- Mark Coleridge – Archbishop of Brisbane

=== Media, entertainment and the arts ===
- Greg Craven – current Vice-Chancellor at the Australian Catholic University, advocate of republicanism, author
- Mark Davis – Australian journalist best known for his work on Dateline, five-time winner of the Walkley Award, winner of the Gold Walkley Award
- Joel Deane – Australian novelist and poet, former chief speech writer for Victorian Premier Steve Bracks
- Matt Doran – journalist with the Seven Network
- Jacob Elordi – actor
- Chet Faker (real name Nicholas Murphy) – singer-songwriter
- Vance Joy (real name James Keogh) – singer-songwriter
- Victor McMahon – virtuoso flautist, educator
- Tim McDonald – comedian, co-host of The Cheap Seats
- Stevie Nicholson, TV personality and performer, member of Hi-5
- Damien Parer – war photographer, cinematographer for Australia's first Oscar-winning film Kokoda Front Line
- Steve Pizzati – former Top Gear Australia host, motoring commentator
- James J. Robinson – director, photographer
- Sam Sejavka – playwright, actor, musician
- Rob Sitch – director, producer, screenwriter, actor
- Bill Tipping – journalist, winner of the Walkley Award
- Feliks Zemdegs – Rubik's Cube speedsolver

=== Politics, public service and the law ===
- Bill Bourke – former politician, former Labor federal Member for Fawkner
- John Bourke QC – former Labor Member for St Kilda in the Victorian Legislative Assembly
- Jack Comber – former Labor federal Member for Bowman
- Barney Cooney – former Labor Senator for Victoria
- Frank Field – former Labor Member for Dandenong in the Victorian Legislative Assembly, 10th Deputy Premier of Victoria
- Jim McClelland – former Labor Senator for New South Wales, solicitor, jurist, Minister in the Third Whitlam Ministry, Royal Commissioner
- Clem Newton-Brown – former Liberal Member for Prahran in the Victorian Legislative Assembly
- Peter Randles – former Labor, Labor Anti-Communist and Democratic Labor Member for Brunswick in the Victorian Legislative Assembly
- Scott Ryan – Liberal Senator for Victoria
- B. A. Santamaria – prominent Australian Roman Catholic, journalist, anti-Communist political activist, founder of the Democratic Labor Party
- Ted Serong DSO, OBE – senior officer of the Australian Army, noted for his contributions to counter-insurgency and jungle warfare tactics during the Vietnam War
- Charles Sweeney QC – former Federal Court Judge
- George White – former Labor, Labor Anti-Communist and Democratic Labor Member for Mentone in the Victorian Legislative Assembly

=== Sport ===
- Tom Allison – Australian rules footballer with North Melbourne Kangaroos
- Michael Blood – Australian rules footballer with Hawthorn Hawks
- Peter Bourke – Athlete and Gold Medallist 800m Brisbane Commonwealth Games 1982
- Michael Bowden – Australian rules footballer with Richmond Tigers and Melbourne Demons
- Morton Browne – Australian rules footballer with Hawthorn Hawks.
- Gary Brice – Australian rules footballer with South Melbourne
- Nick Bryan – AFL Footballer
- Sam Davidson- AFL player
- Jordan De Goey – Australian rules footballer with Collingwoood Magpies
- Liam Donald – Australian national rower
- Lachie Fogarty – Australian rules footballer with Carlton Blues
- Neale Fraser AO, MBE – tennis player, Wimbledon champion 1960 and former world number one
- Simon Garlick – Australian rules footballer with Sydney Swans and Western Bulldogs; football administrator
- Josh Giddey – NBA Basketballer with the Chicago Bulls
- Alexander Graham – Commonwealth Games gold medallist
- Tala Gray- Rugby union player
- Oliver Hanrahan – Australian rules footballer with Hawthorn Hawks
- Lachie Hunter – Australian rules footballer with Western Bulldogs
- Henry Hutchison – rugby union player
- Tom Jok – Australian rules footballer with Essendon Bombers
- Laurie Kerr – Australian rules footballer with Car Blues; founder of the Carlton Social Club at Princes Park
- Peter Kerr – Australian Rules Footballer with Carlton Blues
- Pat Kerr – Australian rules footballer with Carlton Blues
- Phonse Kyne – former Australian rules footballer, captain and coach with Collingwood Magpies
- Allan La Fontaine – former Australian rules footballer, captain and coach with Melbourne Demons
- Tom Liberatore – Australian rules footballer with Western Bulldogs
- Jack Mahony – Australian rules footballer with North Melbourne Kangaroos
- Josh Mahoney – former Australian rules footballer with Port Adelaide
- Luke Mathews (born 21 June 1995) – Olympic middle-distance runner, World Championships representative, Commonwealth Games bronze medallist, Australian Champion for 800m
- Touk Miller – Australian rules footballer with Gold Coast Suns
- Tony Morwood – former Australian rules footballer with Sydney Swans
- Bill Nettlefold – Australian rules footballer with Richmond Tigers, North Melbourne Kangaroos, and Melbourne Demons
- Tom Nicholls – Australian rules footballer with Gold Coast Suns
- Reilly O'Brien – Australian rules footballer with Adelaide Crows
- Ryan O'Keefe – Australian rules footballer with Sydney Swans
- Matthew Owies – Australian rules footballer with Carlton Blues
- Connor Pain – footballer with Melbourne Victory, Central Coast Mariners, and Western United
- Luke Penny – Australian rules footballer with Western Bulldogs and St Kilda Saints
- Stephen Powell – Australian rules footballer with Western Bulldogs, Melbourne Demons, and St Kilda Saints
- Adrian Radley- swimmer
- Ned Reeves – Australian rules footballer with Hawthorn Hawks
- James Rowbottom – Australians rules footballer with Sydney Swans
- Alex Rowe – Australian 800m record holder, Australian champion for 800m
- Brad Scott – Australian rules footballer with Hawthorn Hawks and Brisbane Lions, coach with North Melbourne Kangaroos
- Chris Scott – Australian rules footballer with Brisbane Lions, coach with Geelong Cats
- Conor Stone – Australian rules footballer with GWS Giants
- Tim Taranto – Australian rules footballer with GWS Giants and Richmond Tigers
- Sione Tuipulotu – rugby union player with Glasgow Warriors and captain of Scotland
- Bill Tymms – Australian rules footballer with St Kilda Saints and Melbourne Demons
- Jordan Uelese – rugby union player with Melbourne Rebels
- Mitch Wallis – Australian rules footballer with Western Bulldogs
- Rhylee West – Australian rules footballer with Western Bulldogs
- George Wardlaw – Australian rules footballer with North Melbourne
- Phil Wynd – Australian rules footballer with Hawthorn Hawks
- Jack Della Maddalena UFC Fighter (welterweight)

== See also ==
- Catholic education in Australia
- List of schools in Victoria, Australia
- List of high schools in Victoria
- List of Christian Brothers schools
