= Victor McMahon =

Australian musician (1903–1992)

Victor McMahon (1903 – 9 March 1992) was an Australian flute teacher and flautist. He was Professor of Flute at the Sydney Conservatorium of Music and Supervisor of School (Flute) Bands with the New South Wales Department of Education. He is credited with introducing the flute and recorder to New South Wales schools, greatly increasing the popularity of the flute to generations of students around the state. Among the professional flautists he taught were Don Burrows, Margaret Crawford, Linda Vogt, Jane Rutter, Peter Richardson, Geoffrey Collins, and Mark Underwood. The Victor McMahon Music Centre at St. Kevin's College, Melbourne is named after him.

== Early life ==
Victor McMahon was born in Ballarat, Victoria in 1903, the same small country town as another flute virtuoso, John Lemmone. McMahon had some lessons from and was inspired by Lemmone. His schooling was at St Kevin's College, Melbourne and at the Melbourne Conservatorium of Music, where he studied flute with the celebrated John Amadio before moving to Sydney.

== Career ==
In Sydney, McMahon played in the Prince Edward Theatre Orchestra from 1924 to 1938 and was Professor of Flute at the Sydney Conservatorium of Music from 1932 to 1944. In 1938 he began working with the New South Wales Department of Education to organise school flute bands using B-flat and E-flat flutes that he had designed. He also wrote a tutor for the bands to use. In 1939, McMahon conducted a flute band of 300 performers led by "Master Don Burrows" at a public schools charity concert. By 1940 there were 56 Sydney city schools and 17 rural schools with flute bands. By 1941 a "Special Band" averaging 100 players had formed and was performing in public and in radio broadcasts.

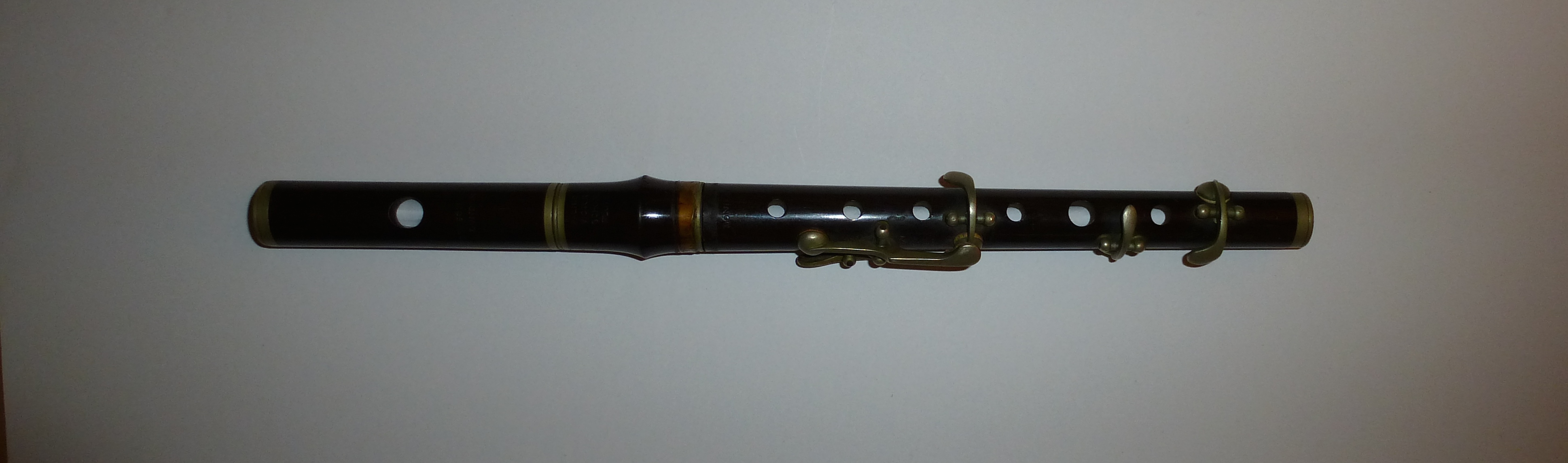
B-flat school flute designed by Victor McMahon (lined with white paper to improve contrast)

The popularity of the bands waxed and waned over the next ten years, as teachers acting as band leaders left to join the Armed Forces or transferred to other schools and as the popularity of the recorder fluctuated.

In 1953, at the request of Eugene Goossens, who was Director of the Sydney Conservatorium of Music, McMahon returned to the conservatorium as Professor of Flute where he became Chairman of the Board of Orchestral Studies and a member of the Board of General Studies. In 1966 he became the first to use the medium of television to teach the recorder to school children. McMahon remained at "the con" until he retired in 1972. He died in Sydney on 9 March 1992.

On 10 May 1992, the Australian Chamber Orchestra performed a Concerto for Flute and Strings that it had commissioned from Anne Boyd and which she dedicated to McMahon.

== Influence on music education in New South Wales ==
"Instrumental music had been attempted in some schools since the early years of [the] century, but received considerable impetus from 1939 under Victor McMahon, the Supervisor of School Music, who encouraged flute bands."

== Radcliff flute ==
McMahon played a Radcliff flute that he had inherited from John Lemmone. McMahon's students all played a modern Boehm flute even though it has a different fingering system from their teacher's. At the age of 85, McMahon gave the flute to the National Film and Sound Archive. It is now held at the Arts Centre Melbourne, Performing Arts Collection.
