= Thea Phillips =

UK-born Australian soprano and teacher of singing

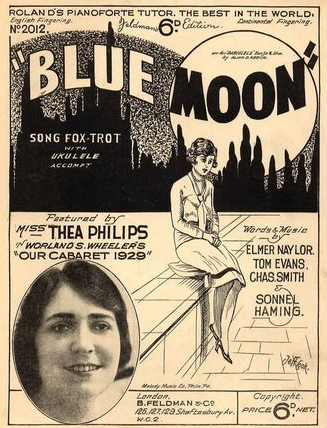
- from a 1929 production
- Born: Dorothy Jane Phillips; 24 December 1892; Dorchester, Dorset, England
- Died: 15 November 1960 (aged 67); Goulburn Street, Sydney, New South Wales, Australia
- Occupations: opera singer and teacher
- Spouse(s): Robert Alfred Clement Pike; Claude Mackay Wallis
- Children: three

Dorothy Jane Phillips, known as Thea Phillips, (24 December 1892 – 15 November 1960) was a UK-born Australian soprano and teacher of singing.

== Life ==
Phillips was born in England in the town of Dorchester, in 1892. Her parents were Emma (born Chapple) and David Phillips. Her father sold clothing. She was singing in Manchester while she was still a teenager. When she went to Italy, she was taught by Emma Molajoli (who also trained Nunù Sanchioni) in Milan and she later sang with the conductor Tullio Serafin in Naples.

In 1929 she was in Worland S. Wheeler's "Our Cabaret of 1929" which featured the song "Blue Moon". (Note: Not the 1934 Rogers and Hart song, "Blue Moon") In 1932 she was a replacement for Lotte Lehmann at Covent Garden in Tannhäuser. As a result she sang the part of Elizabeth for the Royal Family.

In 1934 the producer Ben Fuller attempted to establish an English language grand opera company in Australia. He had the Australian soprano Florence Austral and Phillips in his company and their operas included Il trovatore, La bohème, Rigoletto, Faust, Lohengrin and Die Fledermaus. She was said to be overshadowed by the singing of Austral. Fuller tried unsuccessfully to get government help after the season in Melbourne failed to show a profit and in 1935 Fuller's company was wound up. Phillips however continued to find other work.

In 1941 and 1945 she sang songs by Edith Harrhy at two recitals and in 1947 she began her own Thea Philips School of Opera but it did not last long. In about 1954 Joan Carden was seventeen and her father decided that she needed singing lessons. Phillips was said to be a large and gentle teacher. Carden left for the UK when she was 22 and a leading career.

Phillips' career was affected by her liking for alcohol. She died in a hotel in Sydney's Goulburn Street in 1960.

== Private life ==
Phillips married Robert Alfred Clement Pike in 1916 and they had three sons before they divorced in 1935. In 1941 she married Claude Mackay Wallis and he survived her.
