= John Fuller (theatrical entrepreneur) =

New Zealand theatrical entrepreneur (1879–1959)

- Born: 20 April 1879; London, England
- Died: 26 September 1959 (aged 80); Darlinghurst, New South Wales
- Occupation: Theatre entrepreneur
- Parent: John Fuller
- Family: Ben Fuller

John Fuller (20 April 1879 – 26 September 1959) was an English-born New Zealand theatrical entrepreneur and local politician.

== Biography ==
=== Early life ===
Fuller was born on 20 April 1879 in London, England. His father, John Fuller senior, was a singer and theatre operator and his sons assisted in performances and operations of his company. Fuller performed in his father's minstrel troupe in London before leaving for Australia, arriving in Melbourne on 31 July 1891. He attended school at Collingwood.

=== Early career ===
In February 1892 he was engaged by J. C. Williamson for La Cigale and worked for almost three years in Williamson's Royal Comic Opera Company as call-boy. He frequently played juvenile parts as needed and deputized as stage-manager for Henry Bracy on occasion.

His family moved again, shifting to New Zealand in 1894, settling in Auckland. At the time he was still in school, but still performed several time a week. He sang on Wednesday night's at his father's concerts as well as partaking in Sunday night choir music performances. When his father started waxworks displays and lantern shows from 1898, he assisted his father and gave vaudeville performances, including when they took the show on tour to Dunedin in 1899. His brother Ben remained in Dunedin while he went to Wellington to manage his father's theatre there. He married Alice Gertrude Mary Fraser on 5 July 1902, in Hobart, with whom he had a daughter. He went into the film theatre business in 1907 as well as expanding the vaudeville acts. In 1911 his father retired and Fuller, together with Ben, were assigned the management of the company.

=== Politics ===
In 1911 he was elected a member of the Wellington City Council as an independent candidate. He was re-elected for two further terms (the last of which on the Citizens League ticket) until 1917 when he did not seek re-election.

=== Later career ===
He divorced his first wife in December 1913 and remarried to Lavina Moar on 28 September 1916. In 1914, together with Ben, he became joint governing director of John Fuller & Sons Ltd. In 1916 the company presented a season of Italian grand opera but later that year, after Ben volunteered for military service in World War I, he moved to Sydney to oversee the Australian operations, leaving his other brother Walter in charge in New Zealand. In 1929 he became a director of the Australian Broadcasting Company.

After tiring of regular travelling, and the brothers divided their assets in 1934, with Fuller taking the St James Theatre company and building as most of his share. From then on he dealt in real estate until retiring from all his remaining business activities in 1944.

In retirement he enjoyed playing bowls. He died on 26 September 1959 at St Luke's Hospital, Darlinghurst. He was cremated and was survived by his wife, two sons and two daughters. At the time of his death his estate was valued for probate at £163,406.
