= Peter Kerr (footballer, born 1948) =

Australian rules footballer

Personal information
- Full name: Peter Kerr
- Born: 26 February 1948 (age 78)
- Original team: St Kevin's, Toorak
- Height: 177 cm (5 ft 10 in)
- Weight: 76 kg (168 lb)

Playing career^{1}
Years	Club	Games (Goals)
1967–70	Carlton	39 (1)
- ^{1} Playing statistics correct to the end of 1970.

Peter Kerr (born 26 February 1948) is a former Australian rules footballer who played with Carlton in the Victorian Football League (VFL). His father, Laurie Kerr, also played in the VFL.
