= Carl Pinschof =

Austro-Hungarian Australian honorary consul and businessman (1855-1926)

Carl Ludwig Pinschof (14 April 1855 – 19 May 1926) was an Austro-Hungarian honorary consul, businessman and patron of the arts in Melbourne, who later took Australian citizenship.

== Life ==
Born in Vienna, Pinschof was the son of a banker and studied economics at Leipzig University. After his studies he worked as drugstore manager and served as a soldier with the dragoons. Later he worked as a banker in Vienna.

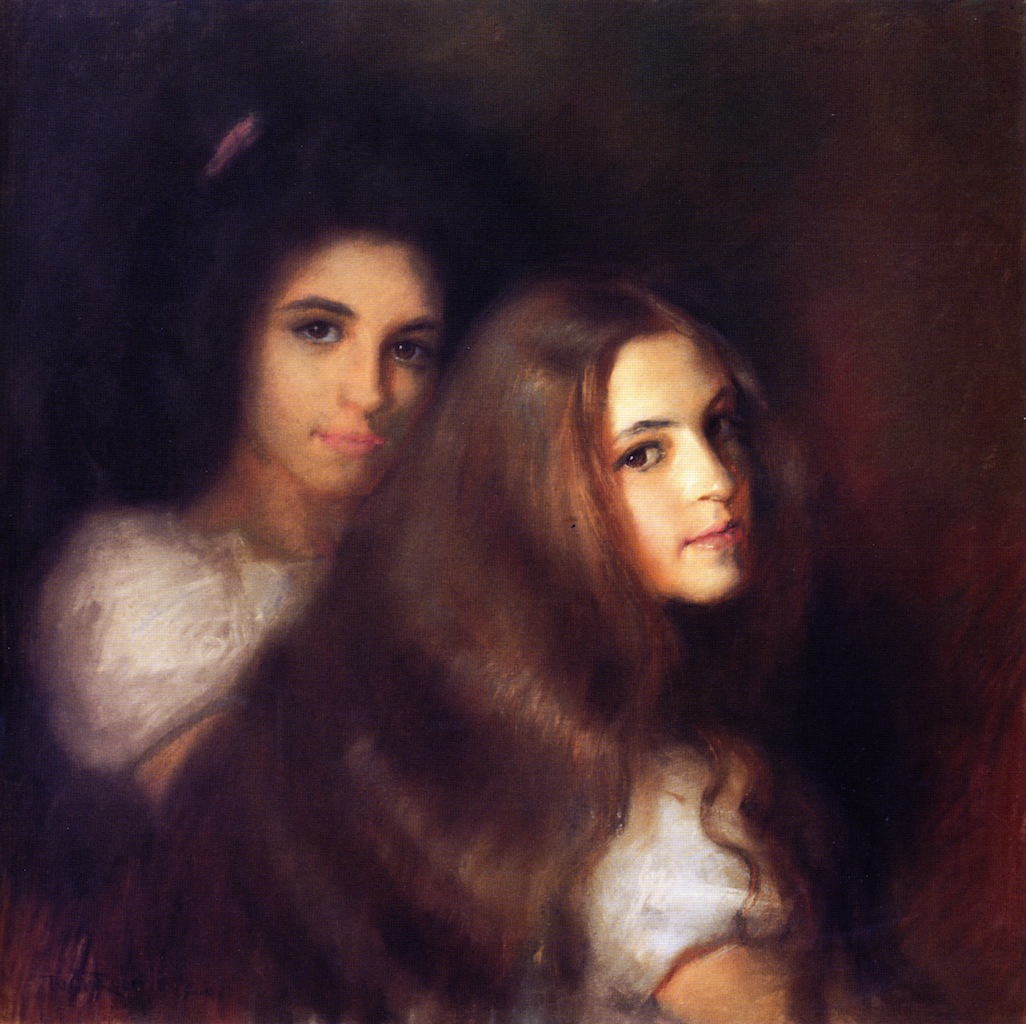
Daughters Elizabeth and Carmen, c. 1900, by Tom Roberts

In 1879 Pinschof was appointed honorary secretary to the Austrian commission of the Melbourne International Exhibition (1880). In 1883 he married the opera singer Elise Wiedermann and settled with her in Australia. Pinschof was appointed honorary consul for Austria-Hungary in Victoria in 1885. He and his wife became known in Melbourne as patrons of the arts and music. They put on art collections in their buildings and promoted the art movements of the time, such as the Impressionist Heidelberg School. Among the artists were the painters Tom Roberts, Arthur Streeton, Carl Kahler, Ambrose Patterson and the sculptor Bertram Mackennal.

From the 1890s, Pinschof became known as an author and lecturer in the wake of the Australian economic depression, which was accompanied by the collapse of several banks and strikes: 1890 Australian maritime dispute, 1891 Australian shearers' strike and the 1892 Broken Hill miners' strike. He called for economic reforms such as setting up an Australian central bank. He advocated not just partial, but full payment on stock purchases and long-term granting of farm loans. He also called for higher education courses in business and public administration to be set up.

In 1900, Pinschof was appointed director of The Herald and Weekly Times newspaper publishing company. He also supported Tom Roberts with his work on The Big Picture. In 1904 he held the post of director of Carlton Brewery Ltd and merged it with five other Melbourne breweries to form Carlton & United Breweries in 1907. In 1908 he sold his brewery and resigned as consul. In 1909 Pinschof took Australian citizenship. He died in Cape Town on a trip to Europe in 1926 and was buried in Melbourne's Boroondara Cemetery.
