= Laurie Kerr =

Australian rules footballer

Personal information
- Full name: Lawrence Kitchin Kerr
- Born: 25 June 1928
- Died: 28 December 2001 (aged 73); Richmond, Victoria
- Original team: Auburn
- Height: 178 cm (5 ft 10 in)
- Weight: 80 kg (176 lb)

Playing career^{1}
Years	Club	Games (Goals)
1950–1959	Carlton	149 (48)
- ^{1} Playing statistics correct to the end of 1959.

Career highlights
- VFL interstate football representative; 1999 - Carlton Hall of Famer; 1948 - Bairnsdale, Bendigo & Heidelburg Gifts; 1949 - Keilor Gift

Lawrence Kitchin Kerr (25 June 1928 – 28 December 2001) was an Australian rules footballer who played with Carlton in the VFL during the 1950s. He was named as an emergency in Carlton's official 'Team of the Century'.

Kerr was educated at St Kevin's College in Toorak.

Kerr had exceptional pace and played in either as a winger, centreman or half-forward flanker.

Prior to his recruitment by the Blues he was a Victorian schoolboy sprint champion and also won a number of gift sprint races in the late 1940's and early 1950's. Kerr was favourite to win the 1948 Stawell Gift after he won his heat but was unable to make the final.

Kerr won both the 1948 Bendigo 100 yard handicap and the 130 yard Bendigo Gift.

Kerr was runner up to Olympic gold medallist, H N "Barney" Ewell in the 1950 Wangaratta Gift, over 130 yards.

His son Peter Kerr played 39 games for Carlton.

His grandson, Pat Kerr, played four senior games for Carlton in the 2010s.
