= Ñuñu Qullu =

Ñuñu Qullu (Aymara ñuñu breast, qullu mountain, "breast mountain", also spelled Nunu Khollu, Nunu Kkollu, Ñuñu Kollu, Ñuñucollo) may refer to:

- Ñuñu Qullu (Cochabamba), a mountain in the Cochabamba Department, Bolivia
- Ñuñu Qullu (Dalence), a mountain in the Pantaleón Dalence Province, Oruro Department, Bolivia
- Ñuñu Qullu (Sajama), a mountain in the Sajama Province, Oruro Department, Bolivia
