= Nunù Sanchioni =

Italian opera singer

Nunù Sanchioni (17 September 1908, Cairo – ?) was an Italian operatic singer. She was considered one of the finest coloratura sopranos of her generation and was often compared with Mercedes Capsir and Toti Dal Monte. Her best roles included Rosina in Gioachino Rossini's Il barbiere di Siviglia and Gilda in Giuseppe Verdi's Rigoletto.

== Life ==
Sanchioni was born in Cairo to the family of an Italian consul in Egypt. In her youth she moved to Italy and probably settled in Milan, where she studied singing with Emma Molajoli who also taught the soprano Thea Phillips. Emma was the wife of the famous conductor Lorenzo Molajoli. She made her debut as Musetta in Giacomo Puccini's La bohème at the Teatro Campoamor in Oviedo in 1926. From 1926 to 1932 she appeared with great success in Italian provincial opera houses, but in 1931 and 1932 she sang Rosina in Il barbiere di Siviglia, Gilda in Rigoletto and Hänsel in Engelbert Humperdinck's Hänsel und Gretel at the Teatro San Carlo in Naples. In the same period, and in 1935, she also sang at the Italian Opera in the Netherlands. In 1932, Sanchioni was struck with an illness which led to her withdrawal from the stage for two years. After her recovery in 1934, she was engaged for the season at the Teatro alla Scala in Milan where she sang the role of Adele in Johann Strauss's operetta Die Fledermaus in the production of Max Reinhardt. Towards the end of the 1930s, Sanchioni married a German citizen and moved to Java, where she performed as a concert singer. She returned to Italy in 1946 and kept singing till 1948.

Little is known about her life after the 1940s; in 1957, 1967 and 1971 Sanchioni appeared in three Italian films (Il sole tornerà; the episode "Premio Nobel" of the TV series TuttoTotò; Il cavaliere inesistente, based on the novel The Nonexistent Knight).

Sanchioni made thirteen recordings for Cigale Records and Columbia Records in the 1930s. They include three duets from Rigoletto with the baritone Apollo Granforte and three duets from Rigoletto and Il barbiere di Siviglia with Enrico Molinari, as well as some solo arias (including Juliette's Waltz from Charles Gounod's Roméo et Juliette).
