= Tooronga Village =

Coordinates: 37°50′46″S 145°2′44″E

Tooronga Village Shopping Centre
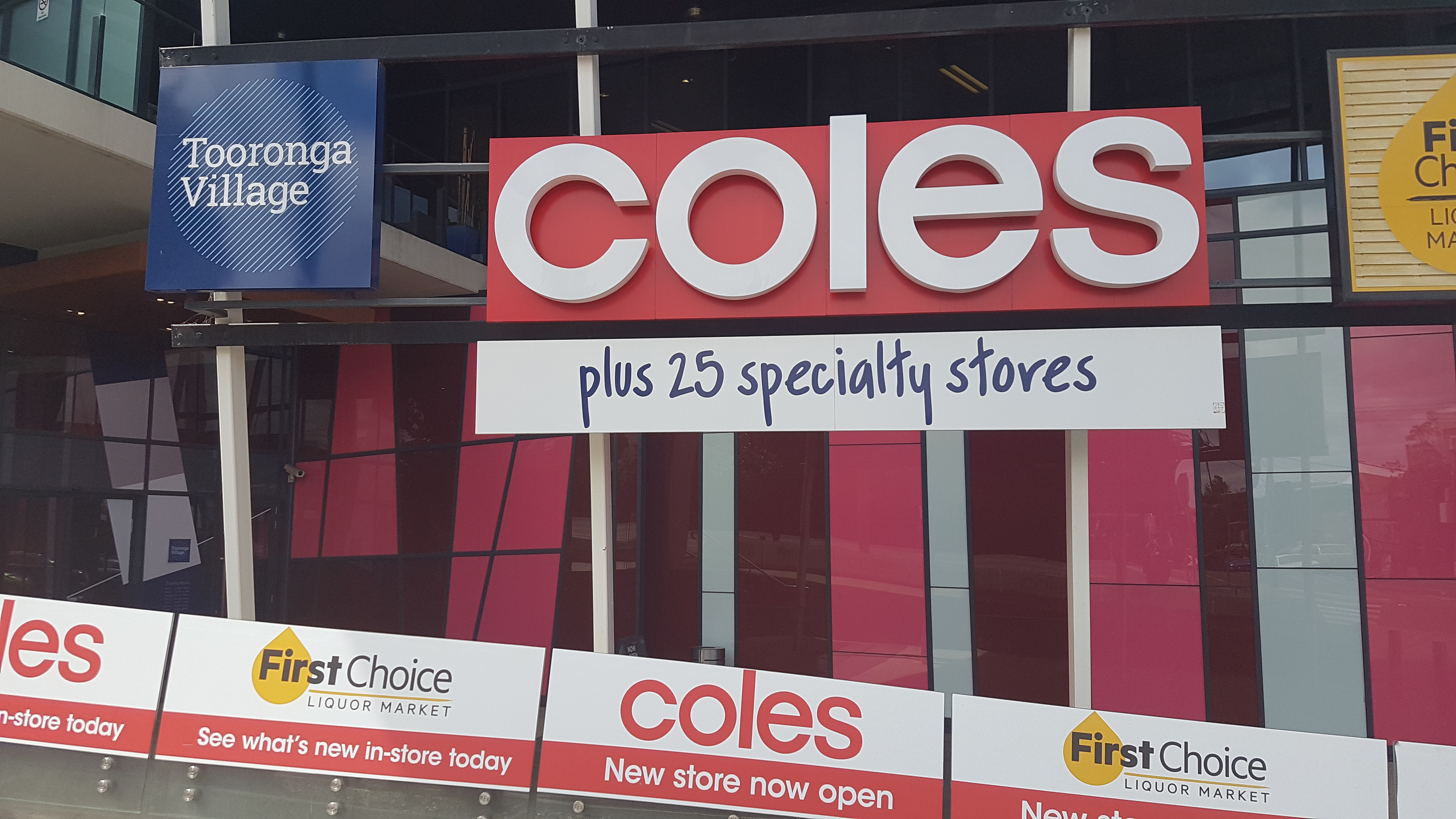
- Tooronga Village front entryway, 2021
- Location: Glen Iris, Victoria, Australia
- Num. of stores: 29
- Num. of anchor tenants: 2

Tooronga Village is a residential, office and retail centre in the suburb of Glen Iris in Melbourne, the capital of the Australian state of Victoria.

It formerly referred solely to a shopping centre, which temporarily closed in March 2008. The mixed-use redevelopment by Stockland covers the former shopping centre site and part of the adjacent former brickworks site. The redeveloped shopping centre re-opened in August 2010 and now has 22 shops, cafes and restaurants in addition to anchor tenants Coles Supermarkets and 1st Choice Liquor Superstore.

== Background ==
The shopping centre dated back to the 1960s (Coles traded there from 1968) but there was little development of the centre since the 1970s. In December 1985, developers Hudson Conway paid $1.25m for the adjacent former brickworks, despite a proposed open-space order on the site approved by the former Hawthorn Council ten years prior. Hudson Conway proposed extending the shopping centre into the brickworks site, substantially expanding the centre and including a discount department store. By 1990, Hudson Conway had varied its proposal several times to include potential combinations of a commercial centre, offices and hotel blocks. The proposals met with substantial local opposition led by the Tooronga Action Group, and anti-development candidates were voted into Hawthorn Council. In 1991 a site-specific development zone was designated for the site, which allowed for more modest development comprising an office complex on the existing shopping centre site, and retail space on the former brickworks site.

Hudson Conway failed to develop the site, and sold its half of the shopping centre site to Coles Myer in 1995. Pacific Shopping Centres subsequently sold its 50% share to Coles Myer in 1997. In 2000, Coles Myer, which had opened its head office on land immediately adjacent in 1986, had plans for a major retail and entertainment development of the precinct but never proceeded with them. Finally, developers Stockland agreed in 2004 to purchase the site from Coles Myer (subject to planning approval) for $30m and proceeded with plans for a mixed-use development, comprising residential, retail and office use. The Victorian State Government upset local residents by taking planning control away from Boroondara Council and approving the project.

In addition to a redeveloped shopping centre of 8,000 sq.m., the overall development intended in five stages over five to seven years was originally planned to have 600 townhouses and apartments (later expanded to 785 apartments) plus office space (4,000 sq.m.) and provide some parking for the adjacent Coles head office. The development works caused minor controversy in November 2008 with the revelation that drinking water was being used in large quantity across the site to suppress dust. By June 2009, economic circumstances had led the developer to opt for a greater number of less expensive apartments. By June 2010, 297 apartments were planned for the first stage of development, with a plan to expand to 785 apartments over five stages. The car servicing franchise Ultra Tune planned to relocate its head office to the precinct.

In December 2011, Stockland abandoned the remaining residential stages of the development, in line with its general exit from the apartment sector, opting instead to sell 7.7 hectares of the undeveloped land back to Coles. In late 2013, Coles sold 5.4 hectares of this vacant land to St Kevin's College (unconfirmed at $23 million) for the purpose of sporting facilities, including three soccer pitches, a hockey pitch, Australian Rules oval, 12 tennis courts and 200 metre athletics track. This facility opened on the 17 June 2017.

In March 2019, Stockland stated its intention to sell Tooronga Village shopping centre and in July 2019, Newmark Capital announced it had purchased the centre, for a figure reported to be in excess of $62 million.
