= Joan Carden =

Australian operatic soprano

Joan Carden AO OBE (born 9 October 1937) is an Australian operatic soprano. She has been described as "a worthy successor to Dame Nellie Melba and Dame Joan Sutherland" and was sometimes known as "the other Joan" (a reference to Sutherland and Dame Joan Hammond) or "The People's Diva". She was a Principal Soprano with Opera Australia for 32 years, and was particularly associated with the title roles of Giacomo Puccini's Tosca and Madama Butterfly. However, she sang over 50 other roles, from the 18th century, including virtually all the Mozart heroines, through to works by contemporary composers.

== Biography ==
Joan Maralyn Carden was born in Melbourne, an only child, in 1937. Her parents were Frank Carden (1902–1967) and Margaret Carden née Cooke (1896–1997). She attended Lee Street State School, North Carlton, and Ormond State School, Melbourne, and was dux of Prahran Technical Girls' School in 1955. Her first experience of opera as a child was hearing Mozart's The Magic Flute, and then Richard Strauss's Salome sung by Joan Hammond. She would later become a friend of Hammond, singing at her funeral in Bowral, and at her memorial concert in Melbourne, and she also received the Dame Joan Hammond Award.

In Melbourne, her first singing teacher was the English-born Wagnerian soprano Thea Phillips when she was seventeen who gave her gentle instruction. Her teacher was then briefly Henri Portnoj. She was a private student at Trinity College of Music in London and won a Stuyvesant Scholarship tenable at London Opera Centre, 1966/7, where her singing teacher was the West Australian expatriate Vida Harford (1907–1992), with whom she studied for the remainder of her teacher's life. She won a major prize in the Munich International Music Competition in September 1967, before graduating from the London Opera Centre that year. She performed in the United Kingdom, and Germany. She returned to Australia in 1970, joining in 1971 the Australian Opera (now Opera Australia) as a major principal till retiring from that company in 2003.

Her debut with OA was in 1971 as Liù in Puccini's Turandot in 1971, then Marguerite in Gounod's Faust. In the first season at the Sydney Opera House (1973–74) she sang Pamina in The Magic Flute. At the Royal Performance in October, she sang Natasha in Prokofiev's War and Peace. Her career with OA saw her sing such other roles as Tosca and Madama Butterfly many times, as well as Marguérite (Faust), Gilda (Rigoletto), Queen Elizabeth (Maria Stuarda; opposite Deborah Riedel in the title role), Desdemona (Otello), Leonora (Il trovatore and La forza del destino), Violetta (La traviata), Tatiana (Eugene Onegin), Mimi (La bohème), most of the Mozart heroines, including Donna Anna and Elvira (Don Giovanni), the Countess (The Marriage of Figaro), Fiordiligi (Così fan tutte), Vitellia (La clemenza di Tito), plus Richard Strauss's Feldmarschallin (Der Rosenkavalier), Ellen Orford (Peter Grimes), the four heroines performed in English and then French, in The Tales of Hoffmann, Eva (Die Meistersinger von Nürnberg), Alice Ford (Falstaff), Elisabetta (Don Carlos), and the title roles in Lakmé, Alcina, Adriana Lecouvreur and Suor Angelica. She also sang a concert repertoire including Verdi's Requiem, appearing with Sydney Philharmonia and other ensembles.

Overseas, she sang Gilda (Rigoletto) at Covent Garden in 1974, Donna Anna (Don Giovanni) at the 1977 Glyndebourne Festival (in the production by Sir Peter Hall) and with the Metropolitan Opera in 1978. Her American debut, however, was as Amenaide with the Houston Grand Opera opposite Marilyn Horne in Rossini's Tancredi. She also appeared as Constanza (The Abduction from the Seraglio) with Scottish Opera in 1978.

In 1980, she performed with the National Symphony Orchestra at the Kennedy Center in Washington, D.C. She sang the four soprano roles in English in Offenbach's The Tales of Hoffmann for Opera North in 1981, and reprised these roles with Opera Australia the following year. and later in French. In 1982, she sang with Greater Miami Opera as Amelia in Verdi's Simon Boccanegra, with Cornell MacNeil.

Joan Carden also sang with I Solisti Veneti, conducted by Richard Divall, and many Australian state opera companies. She played the Mother Abbess in the Adelaide season of The Sound of Music having begun her stage career as understudy to June Bronhill in 1960, in The Merry Widow.

On 26 January 1988 she was given the honour of singing the Australian national anthem Advance Australia Fair to a worldwide audience as part of the celebrations of Australia's Bicentenary. That same day she also sang in the world premiere of Peter Sculthorpe's Child of Australia at the Opera House, with narrator John Howard and the Sydney Philharmonia Choir and Australian Youth Orchestra under Carlo Felice Cillario.

On 11 April 1991 she was invited to share her reminiscences in an address to the National Press Club in Canberra.

She sang 'Waltzing Matilda' and the national anthem during the worldwide telecast of the 1992 AFL Grand Final. In 1993 and at an Australia Day charity concert with José Carreras at Covent Garden before Prince Charles. That year she received an Australian Artists Creative Fellowship.

In 2000 she stepped in at very short notice to sing Tosca in Adelaide for an ailing friend, Deborah Riedel who subsequently died of liver cancer at the age of 50. The story of wearing her own jewellery is apocryphal.

Her farewell major role with Opera Australia was as Tosca in Sydney in 2002. After her final performance she was awarded the Opera Australia Trophy at a ceremony at the Opera House. In March 2003 she was given a reception in her honour by the Governor-General, Major General Michael Jeffery, at Admiralty House, Sydney.

However, she did not stop singing altogether. In 2003, she created the role of "Public Opinion", based on the Australian political figure Pauline Hanson, in the Sydney season of Opera Australia's new production of Offenbach's Orpheus in the Underworld. On 2 June 2003, Joan Carden sang at a ceremony at the Melbourne Town Hall to launch Australia Post's new series of stamps commemorating the 50th anniversary of the Coronation of Queen Elizabeth II.

In 2006 she sang Exsultate, jubilate in a concert at the Great Hall of the University of Sydney with Sydney University Graduate Choir, music director Christopher Bowen, who sponsor the Joan Carden Award for young singers, the concert in honour of the 250th anniversary of the birth of Wolfgang Amadeus Mozart.

In 2006 also, she appeared in the musical Titanic, as Ida Strauss. It opened in Sydney to high praise from the critics, but the run was cut short due to poor ticket sales, and the planned Brisbane and Melbourne seasons were cancelled.

She sang at the memorial concert for Rosina Raisbeck in early 2007. That year she appeared in a straight acting role in the Melbourne season of John Misto's Harp on the Willow, a play with music about the life of the Irish singer Mary O'Hara, starring Marina Prior as O'Hara. In the play, Carden and Prior sang "The Flower Duet" from Delibes' Lakmé.

She was Patron of the now defunct National Voice Centre at the University of Sydney, the Victorian College of the Arts Opera, and the Musical Society of Victoria. and is a trustee of Opera Australia Benevolent Fund.

== Recordings ==
Joan Carden made a number of recordings, videos and DVDs, including La traviata; The People's Diva, which showed her in rehearsal and preparation for Madama Butterfly; and Great Operatic Heroines, with the Queensland Philharmonic Orchestra under Roderick Brydon.

Her singing of the aria "È strano! Ah, fors'è lui " from Verdi's La traviata is heard in the film The Adventures of Priscilla, Queen of the Desert.

== Private life ==
Joan Carden is related to George Frederick Carden, a prominent Melbourne businessman, who founded the Carden Fellowship of Cancer Council Victoria. There is also the G. F. Carden Leukemia Research Foundation, funding from which facilitated treatment pioneered by Professor Don Metcalfe that saved the life of many people, including José Carreras. In 1990 Joan Carden sang at Covent Garden with Carreras and a group of Australian singers in a concert to raise funds for Carreras's own leukaemia research foundation, and she made him aware of this connection.

Her 1962 marriage to a British steeplechase coach William Coyne produced two daughters, and ended in divorce in 1980. Their children are Vida Carden-Coyne (named after her first singing teacher Vida Harford), an arts administrator; and Prof Ana Carden-Coyne, a cultural historian and founder of the Centre for the Cultural History of War at the University of Manchester.

Joan Carden converted from Anglo-Catholicism to Roman Catholicism in 1960. She sang at the funeral of Archbishop Carroll, who was both a spiritual adviser and a great admirer of her singing.

She suffered a number of heart attacks during her career, but returned to the stage each time.

== Honours ==
In the New Year's Day Honours of 1982 Joan Carden was appointed an Officer (OBE) of the Order of the British Empire.

In 1987 she received the Dame Joan Hammond Award for Operatic Excellence.

In the Queen's Birthday Honours of June 1988 she was appointed an Officer (AO) of the Order of Australia.

In 1992 she sang before US President George H. W. Bush on his Australian visit.

In 2001, she was awarded an honorary doctorate by the Swinburne University of Technology in Melbourne. That year she was awarded the Australian Government's Centenary Medal. On 15 April 2004 she was awarded an honorary doctorate by the Australian Catholic University.

In 2005, the Joan Carden Award was created by the Sydney University Graduate Choir, and is awarded to an outstanding young singer .

== Awards and nominations ==
=== ARIA Music Awards ===
The ARIA Music Awards is an annual awards ceremony that recognises excellence, innovation, and achievement across all genres of Australian music. They commenced in 1987.

Year	Nominee / work	Award	Result	Ref.
1989	Australia Day / Child of Australia (with Sydney Symphony Orchestra, Australian Youth Orchestra, & John Howard	Best Classical Album	Nominated	

== Sources ==
- ABC: Compass – Interview with Joan Carden, 16 February 1997
- Joan Maralyn Carden at The Australian Women's Register
