= John Amadio =

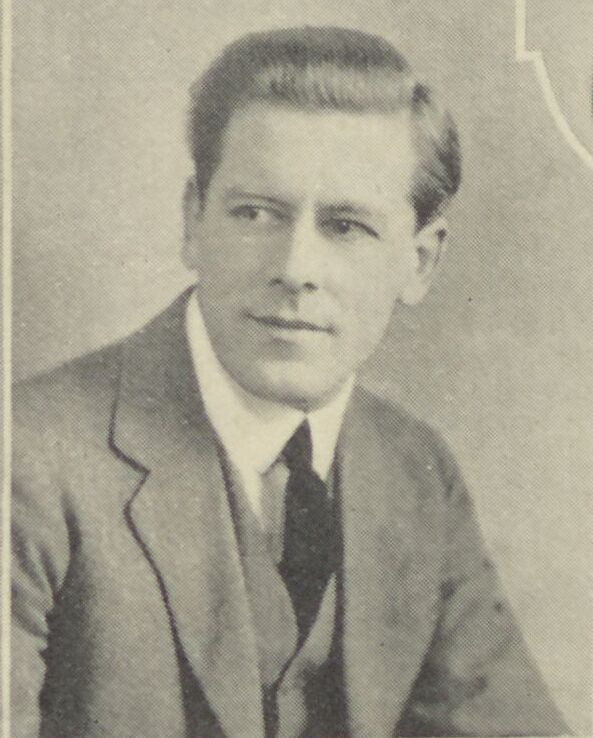

Background information
- Born: November 15, 1883; Christchurch, New Zealand
- Died: April 4, 1964 (aged 80)
- Genres: Classical
- Occupation(s): Musician, soloist, accompanist
- Instrument: Flute
- Formerly of: Italian Opera Company; The Hallé; Clementine de Vere Sapio; Luisa Tetrazzini

John Amadio (15 November 1883 – 4 April 1964) was an Australian flute player, born in New Zealand, who performed with orchestras around the world and made a career as an international soloist and operatic accompanist. "He owed the beginnings of his extraordinary career to a prevailing public taste for operatic soprano arias with florid flute obbligatos."

== Personal life ==
Amadio was born in Christchurch, New Zealand to Samuel Biddle Taylor and Eliza Taylor, and was given the birth name John Bell Taylor. When the boy was one year old, his father died and Eliza took the family to Wellington where, in 1890 at the age of 39, she married a 22-year-old carpenter and amateur flute player, Henry Antonio Amadio. John assumed his stepfather's surname and began learning the flute, showing early promise. He performed with the Wellington Orchestral Society at the age of 11 and again at age 12 as a soloist in a flute concerto, with Alfred Hill conducting.

In 1900 the family moved to Sydney, Australia, and then to Melbourne, where in 1901 the young Amadio gained his first position as a professional flute player. Amadio married a pianist, Leonora Soames Roberts, in 1916; but they separated in 1918 and divorced in 1925. Shortly after, he married the Australian operatic soprano, Florence Austral.

By 1940, Amadio and Austral had separated and during the war years he mostly performed in London orchestras and for the Armed Forces in support of the war effort. In 1947, he returned to Australia, toured with the Australian Broadcasting Commission, joined the Melbourne Symphony Orchestra and then the Tasmanian Symphony Orchestra from 1949 and stayed in the country for the rest of his life. From 1959 Amadio lived in Melbourne in semi-retirement to care for an invalid sister, Evelyn Gunderson. He died in Melbourne in 1964 at the age of 80, during a rehearsal (with Hector Crawford conducting) of the overture to Glinka's Rusland and Lyudmila at the Sidney Myer Music Bowl.

== Career ==
Amadio's first professional job as principal flute was with J. C. Williamson's Italian Opera Company. There, in 1902 he accompanied the French-American operatic soprano Clementine de Vere Sapio, who presented him with the ruby ring from her finger and a bouquet of flowers after their performance of the "Mad Scene" from Lucia di Lammermoor. Later he was principal flute in Nellie Melba's opera orchestra when she toured Australia in 1911. From 1903 to 1912 he played in the Marshall Hall orchestra, and from 1909 to 1920 taught flute at the Melbourne Conservatorium of Music. Among his students were the later Australian virtuosi, Victor McMahon, Leslie Barklamb, and John's own nephew Neville Amadio, who was principal flute with the Sydney Symphony Orchestra for 50 years.

In 1919, Amadio began his international career accompanying Luisa Tetrazzini and performing with The Hallé Orchestra, where Henry Wood described Amadio's playing as "the finest tone I have ever heard". From then until 1947, Amadio was based in London, touring with his second wife, Florence Austral, and accompanying well-known operatic sopranos of the day such as Emma Calvé, Frieda Hempel, Lily Pons and Amelita Galli-Curci. In 1925, Amadio and Austral visited the United States for the first time, and from then until 1936 they spent six months of every year touring there, performing in many cities including Washington, D.C., Chicago, Cleveland, Boston, San Francisco and New York City. Amadio often shared the stage with performers like the tenors Tito Schipa and Richard Crooks, the bass Ezio Pinza, and violinist Alfredo Campoli. "In the US, Australia and England they were commonly met by crowds of thousands. They would consistently sell out the choir lofts and require extra seating on the stage."

== Flutes ==
Amadio played a number of Radcliff system flutes, including some in different keys. These included a bass flute, a low-pitched flute d'amour in B-flat, and an alto flute in G. He was an early advocate of metal flutes and some of his flutes are in the possession of the Powerhouse Museum in Sydney.

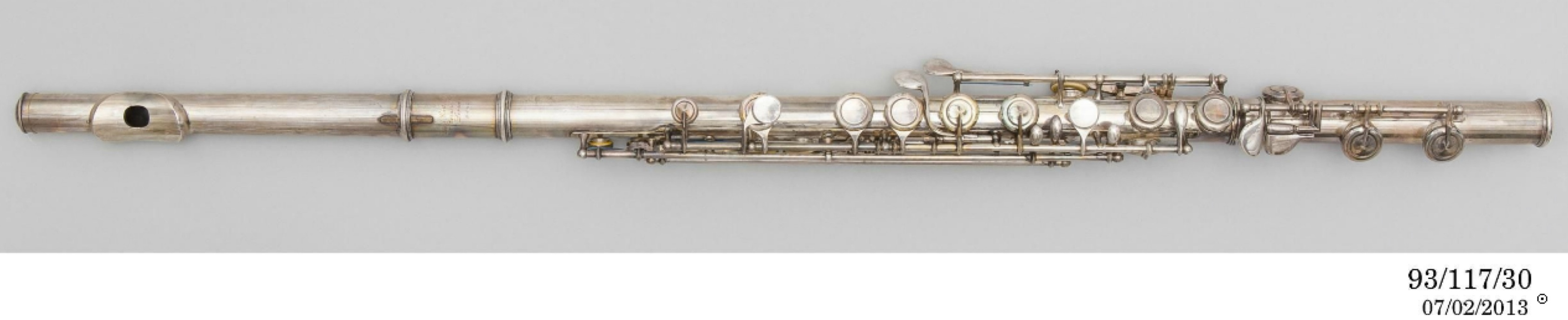
Flute played by John Amadio and made by Rudall Carte & Co, 1923.

== Musical style ==
John Amadio and his contemporary, John Lemmone capitalised on the taste of their time for florid operatic arias accompanied by flute obbligatos (in the contradictory sense that they were decorative and played ad lib). A reviewer at the time reported: "Schipa is a fine artist and he drew a bigger crowd than did Heifetz, yet Amadio and his flute quite completely overshadowed Schipa during the first half of the program." Solo performances were often of the Mozart D major Flute Concerto (which Mozart had adapted from his own Oboe Concerto) with the outer movements often played "at breakneck speed", sometimes in order to fit on the early disc recordings. However, he also played works by other composers, including Maurice Ravel, Frank Bridge and Cécile Chaminade.
