= Elsa Stralia =

Australian soprano

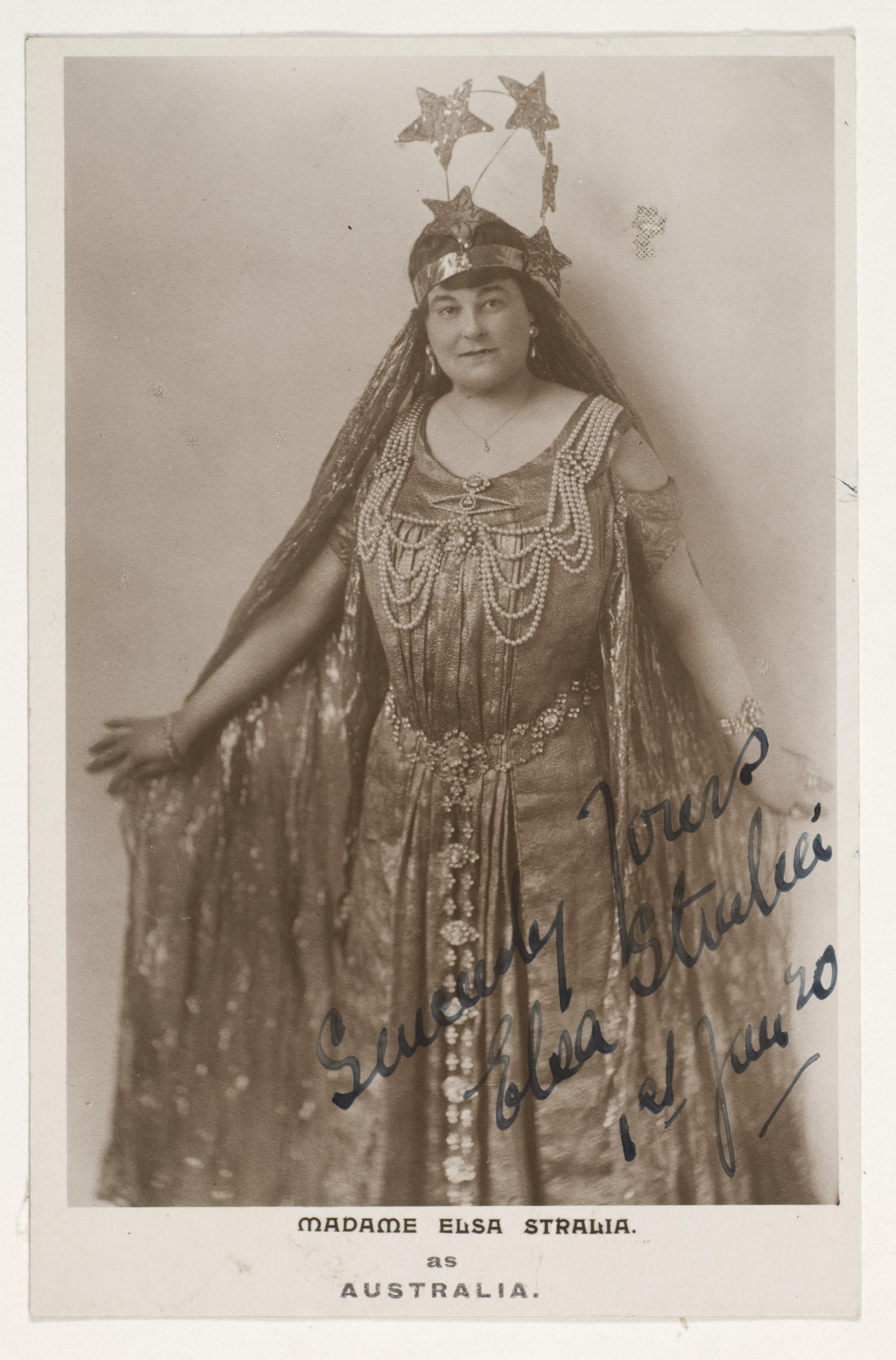
- Born: Elsie Mary Fischer; 1 March 1881; Norwood, South Australia
- Died: 31 August 1945 (aged 64); Belgrave, Victoria, Australia
- Occupation: Dramatic Soprano
- Spouse(s): William Mountford Moses (1908-19??; marriage dissolved); Adolph Theodor Christensen (1935-1943; his death)

Elsa Stralia, born Elsie Mary Fischer (1 March 1881 – 31 August 1945) was an Australian dramatic soprano with an international reputation in Europe and America.

== Family ==
The daughter of Johannes Hugo Fischer (1850–1901), and Annie Christiana Fischer (1858–1898), née Claussen, Elsie Mary Fischer was born in Norwood, South Australia on 1 March 1881. The family moved to Melbourne in 1899, where she was convent-educated.

She married William Mountford Moses (1875–1940) in Sydney on 24 December 1908. She divorced Moses in 1935.

She married Adolph Theodor Christensen (1878–1942) of Pātea, New Zealand in Sydney on 14 November 1935. They lived in Pātea until Christensen's death in 1942.

== Stage name ==
Like other noted Australian sopranos, such as June Mary Gough (1929–2005) ("June Bronhill", after Broken Hill), Vera Honor Hempseed (1890–1952) ("Madame Vera Tasma", after Tasmania), Helen Porter Mitchell (1861–1931) ("Nellie Melba", after Melbourne), Dorothy Mabel Thomas (1896–1978) ("Dorothy Canberra"), Florence Ellen Towl (1870–1952) ("Madame Ballara", after Ballarat), and Florence Mary Wilson (1892–1968) ("Florence Austral"), Elsie Mary Fischer adopted the stage name "Elsa Stralia" in honour of Australia.

== Career ==
After appearing in Sydney, she studied in Milan and London. She made her Covent Garden, London debut as Donna Elvira in Mozart's Don Giovanni in 1913, under the professional name of Elsa Stralia. She appeared at Covent Garden, and in Milan, Paris, South Africa and New York City. She toured in South Africa, and in a number of American cities, once singing "The Star-Spangled Banner" while dressed as the Statue of Liberty. She recorded for the Columbia Graphophone Company, and toured Australasia in 1925 and 1934.

== Death ==
On the death of her husband, she returned to Australia. She died, childless, at Belgrave, Victoria.

== The Elsa Stralia Scholarship ==
Her estate was used to establish a scholarship for young Australian female singers.
