= Florence Austral =

Australian operatic soprano

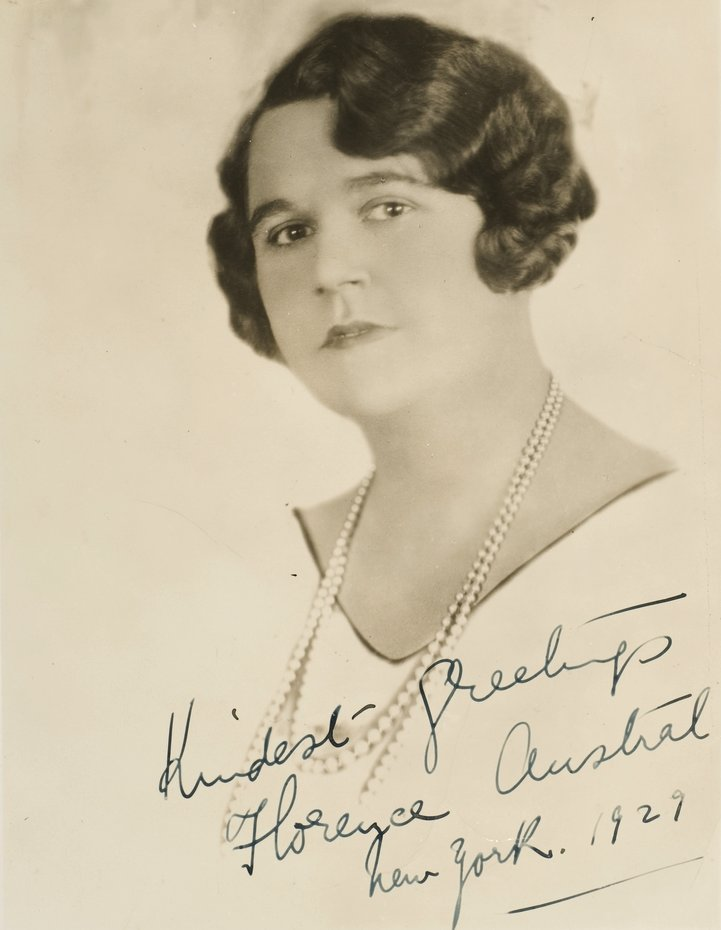
- Florence Austral, dramatic soprano, 1929
- Born: Florence Mary Wilson; 26 April 1892; Richmond, Victoria, Australia
- Died: 15 May 1968 (aged 76); Mayfield, New South Wales, Newcastle, Australia
- Occupation: Operatic singer

Florence Austral (26 April 1892 – 15 May 1968) was an Australian operatic dramatic soprano renowned for her interpretation of the most demanding Wagnerian female roles, although she never gained the opportunity to appear at the Bayreuth Festival or New York's Metropolitan Opera.

It has been said of Austral that she was "considered to have few equals in sheer vocal quality until the arrival of Kirsten Flagstad. Acting was not her strong point; and her characterisations were mainly achieved with the voice, which made her recordings so vastly enjoyable." Austral, Germaine Lubin, and Frida Leider were "considered to be the great Wagnerian dramatic sopranos of their era, together with Flagstad, who did not rise to international fame until the 1930s. (Among all post-War Wagnerian sopranos, only Birgit Nilsson and, to a lesser extent, Astrid Varnay, have been in their exalted league.)"

== Early life ==
Florence Mary Wilson was born in Richmond, Victoria on 26 April 1892. She was the daughter of a Swedish carpenter who had changed his name from Wilhelm Lindholm to William Wilson, and the dressmaker Helena Mary, née Harris. Her father died in 1895 and her mother set up in business. In 1903, Florence's mother married again, to a 28-year-old Syrian book-keeper named John Fawaz, and Florence took the name Florence Fawaz.

== Stage name ==
Like other noted Australian sopranos, such as Elsie Mary Fischer (1881-1945) ("Elsa Stralia"), June Mary Gough (1929-2005) ("June Bronhill", after Broken Hill), Vera Honor Hempseed (1890-1952) ("Madame Vera Tasma", after Tasmania), Helen Porter Mitchell (1861-1931) ("Nellie Melba", after Melbourne), Dorothy Mabel Thomas (1896-1978) ("Dorothy Canberra"), and Florence Ellen Towl (1870-1952) ("Madame Ballara", after Ballarat), Florence Mary Wilson adopted the professional surname Austral in 1921 in honour of Australia.

== Career ==
Austral was discovered by the choirmaster Rev. Edward Sugden at the Wesleyan Methodist Church in Palmerston Street, Carlton, Melbourne (now Church of All Nations). In 1914, she won first prizes in both the soprano and mezzo-soprano categories at a singing contest in Ballarat, obtaining a scholarship which enabled her to continue her studies with Elise Wiedermann. She went to New York in 1919 to study further with Gabriele Sibella. Her voice impressed influential listeners and she was offered a contract to sing at the Metropolitan Opera; however, she declined the Met offer to gain stage experience in England, and never again had a chance to sing with the New York company.

Austral duly went to London where she was promoted by the leading British bass of the day, Robert Radford. She made her Covent Garden debut on 16 May 1922 as Brünnhilde in Wagner's Die Walküre, and later in the same role in Siegfried. She shared this role with Frida Leider, who received greater acclaim due to her superior acting skills. Austral's other roles at Covent Garden included Isolde and the title role in Verdi's Aida.

In 1923, Austral appeared with Dame Nellie Melba, who called her "one of the wonder voices of the world", praising the purity of her tone and the gleaming power of her high notes. Unfortunately for her career, due to prevailing circumstances and the reputed antipathy of conductor Bruno Walter, she ended up singing more with the British National Opera Company than at Covent Garden in the 1920s.

During the mid-1920s, she made the first of more than 100 recordings for His Master's Voice, which are still treasured by collectors. The famous recording engineer and producer at His Master's Voice, Fred Gaisberg, said: "In the early twenties Florence Austral was the most important recording artist we had, thanks to the beauty, power and compass of her voice".

Austral recorded operatic arias, as well as songs, sacred music and oratorio extracts. She can also be heard in notable duets opposite Feodor Chaliapin, Miguel Fleta, Tudor Davies and Walter Widdop, which employ both the acoustic and electrical recording processes. (Her acoustic recordings for His Master's Voice include the pioneering English-language series of excerpts from The Ring Cycle.)

In 1925, Austral became the second wife of the Australian flautist John Amadio, and they toured widely together in America, Europe and Australia. She often sang in the Ring operas in Philadelphia, and in concert under the conductor Fritz Reiner. However, she never appeared at Bayreuth, or at the Vienna State Opera. She was negotiating to sing in Vienna, but this did not eventuate.

Neville Cardus, writing in the Manchester Guardian in 1928, said: "The Waters of the Rhine seem to mount high, and over all rides the triumphant voice of Florence Austral as Brunnhilde. Her singing can justly be called queenly. Even after hearing the glorious singing of Frida Leider on other records, Austral's triumphant voice remains in the mind."

Austral became a principal singer with the esteemed Berlin State Opera in 1930. It was there in that same year that she showed the first signs of multiple sclerosis, which manifested themselves on stage during a performance of Die Walküre opposite bass-baritone Friedrich Schorr. Her opera career gradually suffered as a result of the advance of this debilitating disease, but she was still able to devote herself to concert and recital work, developing a large lieder repertoire, although she also sang operatic pieces. Her appearances in opera during this time included those in her home country of Australia. She appeared with, and overshadowed, Thea Phillips and she toured with tenor Walter Widdop in 1934–35, singing the Australian premiere of Les pêcheurs de perles.

Austral returned to Britain in 1939, and appeared in many benefit concerts during the early part of World War II, before her illness forced her to retire in 1940. In 1946, she returned to Australia. Many of her possessions were lost in a fire. Royalty earnings from her recordings had also declined, and she found herself in need of an income, so she taught singing at the Newcastle Conservatorium, New South Wales (now part of the University of Newcastle) from 1954 until her retirement in 1959.

== Death ==
Austral gave several newspaper interviews in her retirement. She died of cerebrovascular disease in a church home for the aged at Mayfield, Newcastle, on 15 May 1968, aged 76. By general critical consent, she remains the finest dramatic soprano ever produced by Australia. Various recordings of hers have been made available on CD reissues.
