= 1963 Birthday Honours =

British government recognitions

The Queen's Birthday Honours 1963 were appointments in many of the Commonwealth realms of Queen Elizabeth II to various orders and honours to reward and highlight good works by citizens of those countries. The appointments were made "on the occasion of the Celebration of Her Majesty's Birthday", and were published in supplements to the London Gazette of 31 May 1963.

At this time honours for Australians were awarded both in the United Kingdom honours, on the advice of the premiers of Australian states, and also in a separate Australia honours list.

Recipients of honours are listed here as they were styled before their new honour.

== United Kingdom ==
=== Baron ===
- The Right Honourable Charles Hill, M.D., M.P., Member of Parliament for Luton since 1950. Parliamentary Secretary, Ministry of Food, 1951–1955; Postmaster-General, 1955–1957; Chancellor of the Duchy of Lancaster, 1957–1961; Minister of Housing and Local Government and Minister for Welsh Affairs, 1961–1962. For political and public services.
- Brigadier Sir Alick Drummond Buchanan-Smith, C.B.E., T.D., J.P., D.L., Deputy Chairman of the Unionist Party in Scotland, 1960–1963. For political and public services in Scotland.

=== Privy Counsellor ===
- Joseph Bradshaw Godber, Esq., M.P. Member of Parliament for Grantham since 1951. Assistant Government Whip, 1955–1957; Joint Parliamentary Secretary, Ministry of Agriculture, Fisheries and- Food, 1957–1960; Parliamentary Under-Secretary of State for Foreign Affairs, 1960–1961; Minister of State for Foreign Affairs since 1961.
- Sir John Gardiner Sumner Hobson, O.B.E., T.D., Q.C., M.P. Member of Parliament for Warwick and Leamington since 1957. Solicitor-General, 1962; Attorney-General since 1962.
- The Right Honourable Oliver Brian Sanderson, Baron Poole, C.B.E., T.D. Member of Parliament for Oswestry, 1945–1950. Joint Honorary Treasurer of the Conservative Party Organisation, 1952–1955;• Chairman, 1955–1957; Deputy Chairman, 1957–1959; Joint Chairman since April 1963.

=== Baronet ===
- Sir Eric Errington, M.P. Member of Parliament for Bootle, 1935–1945, and for Aldershot since 1954. For political and public services.
- Charles Ian Orr-Ewing, Esq., O.B.E., M.P. Member of Parliament for Hendon North since 1950. Parliamentary Under-Secretary of State for Air 1957–1959; Parliamentary and Financial Secretary, Admiralty, 1959; Civil Lord of the Admiralty, 1959–1963. For political and public services.

=== Knight Bachelor ===
- Arthur Capel Herbert Bell, Esq., M.B., F.R.C.S., President, Royal College of Obstetricians and Gynaecologists.
- Denis William Brogan, Esq., Professor of Political Science, University of Cambridge.
- Alderman Kenneth Alfred Leader Brown, J.P. For political and public services in Bristol.
- John Bruce, Esq., C.B.E., T.D., F.R.C.S., Regius Professor of Clinical Surgery, University of Edinburgh.
- Professor William Mansfield Cooper, Vice-Chancellor, University of Manchester.
- Andrew James Maitland-Makgill-Crichton, Esq., Chairman, Employers' Side, National Joint Council for the Port Transport Industry. Chairman, National Association of Port Employers.
- John Nuttall Maxwell Entwistle, Esq., Alderman, Liverpool City Council.
- John Nicholson Hogg, Esq., T.D., Chairman, Export Guarantees Advisory Council.
- Ronald Holroyd, Esq., Deputy Chairman, Imperial Chemical Industries Ltd.
- Colonel John Frederick Crompton-Inglefield, T.D., D.L. For political and public services in Derbyshire.
- Richard Leofric Jackson, Esq., C.B.E., Assistant Commissioner, Metropolitan Police. President, International Criminal Police Organization.
- Professor Ewart Ray Herbert Jones, Waynflete Professor of Chemistry, University of Oxford.
- Norman Samuel Joseph, Esq., C.B.E., Director, Joseph Lyons and Company Ltd. Honorary Catering Adviser to the Home Office.
- Geoffrey Kitchen, Esq., T.D., Chairman, Pearl Assurance Company Ltd.
- Henry Brailsford Lawson, Esq., M.C., President of the Law Society.
- Alan Lubbock, Esq., Chairman, Hampshire County Council.
- Robert Edwin McAlpine, Esq., Director, Sir Robert McAlpine and Sons Ltd.
- Captain John MacLeod, T.D., M.P., Member of Parliament for Ross and Cromarty since 1945. For political and public services.
- Douglas Marshall, Esq., M.P., Member of Parliament for Bodmin since 1945. For political and public services.
- William John Herbert de Wette Mullens, Esq., D.S.O., T.D. Lately Senior Government Broker.
- Kenneth Swift Peacock, Esq., Chairman and Managing Director, Guest Keen and Nettlefolds, Ltd.
- Michael Edward Rowe, Esq., C.B.E., Q.C., Deputy Chairman, Local Government Commission for England.
- Harold Samuel, Esq. For public and charitable services.
- Alexander Samuels, Esq., C.B.E., Honorary Adviser to the Minister of Transport on London Traffic Management.
- Norman Sanger Tucker, Esq., O.B.E., General Secretary, National Council of the Young Men's Christian Association.
- Percy Frederick Ronald Venables, Esq., Principal, Birmingham College of Advanced Technology.
- Alderman Martin Kelso Wallace, J.P., Lord Mayor of Belfast.
- Norman Charles Wright, Esq., C.B. For past services as Chief Scientific Adviser (Food), Ministry of Agriculture, Fisheries and Food.
- Myles Dermot Norris Wyatt, Esq., C.B.E., Chairman and Managing Director, British United Airways Ltd.

State of Victoria

- The Reverend Clarence Irving Benson, C.B.E., Superintendent of the Wesley Church Central Mission, Melbourne, State of Victoria.
- Colin York Syme, Esq., President of the Walter and Eliza Institute of Research, Royal Melbourne Hospital, State of Victoria.

State of Queensland

- Oswald Ellis Joseph Murphy, Esq., Ch.M., F.R.C.P., of Brisbane, State of Queensland. For services in the field of Medicine.

State of South Australia

- Ivan Bede Jose, Esq., M.C., M.B., F.R.C.S., a Consultant Surgeon, Royal Adelaide Hospital, State of South Australia.
- Ewen McIntyre Waterman, Esq., of Strathalbyn, State of South Australia. For services to the pastoral industry.

State of Western Australia

- Joseph Francis Ledger, Esq. For services to industrial development in the State of Western Australia.

Commonwealth Relations

- Hugh Mackay Tallack, Esq., President of the Bengal Chamber of Commerce and Industry and of the Associated Chambers of Commerce of India.

Overseas Territories

- Joshua Abraham Hassan, Esq., C.B.E., M.V.O., Q.C., J.P. For public services in Gibraltar.
- Francis Challenor Hutson, Esq., C.B.E. For public services in Barbados.
- Peter Watkin Williams, Esq., Chief Justice of the High Commission Territories of Basutoland, Bechuanaland Protectorate and Swaziland.
- Campbell Wylie, Esq., Q.C., E.D., Chief Justice of the Joint Court of Sarawak, North Borneo and Brunei.

=== Order of the Bath ===
==== Knight Grand Cross of the Order of the Bath (GCB) ====
- Admiral Sir John David Luce, K.C.B., D.S.O., O.B.E.
- Sir Harold Simcox Kent, K.C.B., H.M. Procurator-General and Treasury Solicitor.

==== Knight Commander of the Order of the Bath (KCB) ====
- Lieutenant General Malcolm Cartwright Cartwright-Taylor, C.B.
- Vice Admiral Michael Le Fanu, C.B., D.S.C.
- Lieutenant-General Kenneth Thomas Darling, C.B., C.B.E., D.S.O., late Infantry.
- Acting Air Marshal Thomas Norman Coslett, C.B., O.B.E., Royal Air Force.
- Acting Air Marshal Christopher Harold Hartley, C.B., C.B.E., D.F.C., A.F.C., Royal Air Force.
- William Armstrong, Esq., C.B., M.V.O., Joint Permanent Secretary to H.M. Treasury.

==== Companion of the Order of the Bath (CB) ====
Military Division

- Rear Admiral Frederick Dossor, C.B.E.
- Rear Admiral Philip David Gick, O.B.E., D.S.C.
- Rear Admiral Morice Gordon Greig, D.S.C.
- Major General Robert Dyer Houghton, O.B.E., M.C.
- Rear Admiral Horace Rochfort Law, O.B.E., D.S.C.
- Rear Admiral Hugh Colenso Martell, C.B.E.
- Rear Admiral Richard Arthur James Owen.
- Rear Admiral Erroll Norman Sinclair, D.S.C.
- Surgeon Rear Admiral (D) Philip Stanley Turner, Q.H.D.S., L.D.S.
- Major-General Richard George Fellowes Frisby, C.B.E., D.S.O., M.C., late Infantry.
- Major-General Courtnay Traice David Lindsay, late Royal Regiment of Artillery.
- Major-General John Edward Longworth Morris, C.B.E., D.S.O., late Royal Regiment of Artillery.
- Major-General William Odling, O.B.E., M.C., late Royal Regiment of Artillery.
- Major-General David Peel Yates, D.S.O., O.B.E., late Infantry. Colonel, The South Wales Borderers.
- Major-General Francis James Claude Piggott, C.B.E., D.S.O., late Infantry.
- Major- General Alwyne Michael Webster Whistler, C.B.E., late Royal Corps of Signals.
- Major-General John Francis Worsley, O.B.E., M.C., late Infantry.
- Air Vice-Marshal William Edward Coles, C.B.E., D.S.O., D.F.C., A.F.C., Royal Air Force.
- Air Vice-Marshal Stewart William Blacker Menaul, C.B.E., D.F.C., A.F.C., Royal Air Force.
- Air Vice-Marshal John Brown Wallace, O.B.E., Q.H.S., M.D., Ch.B., Royal Air Force.
- Air Commodore George Francis Wheaton Heycock, D.F.C., Royal Air Force.
- Air Commodore Ralph Coburn Jackson, M.R.C.S., F.R.C.P., Royal Air Force.
- Air Commodore James Maitland Nicholson Pike, D.S.O., D.F.C., Royal Air Force.
- Air Commodore John Clifford Pope, C.B.E., Royal Air Force.
- Air Commodore Ian James Spencer, D.F.C., Royal Air Force.

Civil Division

- Douglas Albert Vivian Allen, Esq., Third Secretary, H.M. Treasury.
- Edgar Warren Chivers, Esq., Director, Royal Armament Research and Development Establishment, War Office.
- Major Erlam Stanley Dobb, Director, Agricultural Land Service, Ministry of Agriculture, Fisheries and Food.
- Harry Hill Donnelly, Esq., Deputy Secretary, Scottish Education Department.
- William Gordon Harris, Esq., Director-General of Works, Ministry of Public Building and Works.
- David Charles Beresford Holden, Esq., E.R.D., Second Secretary, Ministry of Finance for Northern Ireland.
- Stanley Marks Krusin, Esq., Parliamentary Counsel.
- David William Shuckburgh Lidderdale, Esq., Clerk Assistant, House of Commons.
- Bertram Mitchell, Esq., Chief Inspector, Board of Customs and Excise.
- Lewis Frederick Nicholson, Esq., Director-General of Scientific Research (Air), Ministry of Aviation.
- Arthur William Peterson, Esq., M.V.O., Assistant Under-Secretary of State, Home Office.
- Edward Alexander Keane Ridley, Esq., Principal Assistant Solicitor, Office of H.M. Procurator-General and Treasury Solicitor.
- Daniel Thomson, Esq., M.D., Deputy Chief Medical Officer, Ministry of Health.
- Albert Edward Tollerfield, Esq., Assistant Comptroller, Patent Office, Board of Trade.

=== Order of St Michael and St George ===
==== Knight Grand Cross of the Order of St Michael and St George (GCMG) ====
- Sir Patrick Henry Dean, K.C.M.G., Permanent United Kingdom Representative to the United Nations, New York.

==== Knight Commander of the Order of St Michael and St George (KCMG) ====
- David Wathen Stather Hunt, Esq., C.M.G., O.B.E., British High Commissioner in Uganda.
- Charles Michael Walker, Esq., C.M.G., British High Commissioner in Ceylon.
- Colin Tradescant Crowe, Esq., C.M.G., Her Majesty's Ambassador Extraordinary and Plenipotentiary in Jedda.
- Robert David John Scott Fox, Esq., C.M.G., Her Majesty's Ambassador Extraordinary and Plenipotentiary in Santiago.
- Ivor Thomas Montague Pink, Esq., C.M.G., Her Majesty's Envoy Extraordinary and Minister Plenipotentiary in Budapest.
- Alan Meredith Williams, Esq., C.M.G., Her Majesty's Consul-General, New York.

==== Companion of the Order of St Michael and St George (CMG) ====
- Eric Coome Maynard Cullingford, Esq., Labour Attaché, British Embassy, Bonn.
- James Littlewood, Esq., lately Chairman, Empire Cotton Growing Corporation.
- John Barraclough Loynes, Esq., an Adviser, Bank of England.
- Eric Lawrance Phillips, Esq., Assistant Secretary, Board of Trade.
- John Haddow Riddoch, Esq., Under Secretary, Ministry of Aviation.
- Sydney Herbert Shaw, Esq., O.B.E., Geological Adviser, and Director of Overseas Geological Surveys.
- William Allan McInnes Green, Esq., Town Clerk of the City of Perth, State of Western Australia.
- John Charles Hooton, Esq., M.B.E., Legal Secretary, East African Common Services Organisation.
- Norman Jameson, Esq., of Indooroopilly, State of Queensland. For services to industry.
- Robin Leslie Darlow Jasper, Esq., Deputy British High Commissioner, Ibadan.
- Frederick Austin Johnston, Esq., C.B.E., Chairman of the Finance Committee for the VIIth British Commonwealth Games, Perth, State of Western Australia.
- William Gordon Mathieson, Esq., Under-Secretary and Comptroller of Accounts, Treasury, State of New South Wales.
- Eric George Norris, Esq., Deputy British High Commissioner, Calcutta.
- Aldhelm St John Sugg, Esq., Provincial Commissioner, Southern Province, Northern Rhodesia.
- Kenneth Martin Cowley, Esq., O.B.E., Provincial Commissioner, South Province, Kenya.
- John Cartwright Braddon Fisher, Esq., O.B.E., Administrative Officer, Class 1A, Sarawak.
- Anthony Macgregor Grier, Esq., Under Secretary, North Borneo.
- Harold Percival Hall, Esq., M.B.E., Assistant Secretary, Colonial Office.
- Henry Wylde Edwards Heath, Esq., Commissioner of Police, Hong Kong.
- Geoffrey Charles Lawrence, Esq., O.B.E., Financial Secretary, Zanzibar.
- Archibald Cameron Reid, Esq., Secretary for Fijian Affairs, Fiji.
- Anthony Redfern Rushford, Esq., Assistant Legal Adviser to the Secretary of State for the Colonies.
- Ivor Otterbein Smith, Esq., O.B.E., Chairman of the Public Service Commission and of the Police Service Commission, British Guiana.
- John Lawrence Harvey Webster, Esq., Permanent Secretary, Kenya.
- John Arnold Harrop Wolff, Esq., Provincial Commissioner, Rift Valley Province, Kenya.
- Harold Arthur Neville Brown, Esq., C.V.O., lately Her Majesty's Ambassador Extraordinary and Plenipotentiary in Monrovia.
- Derek Sherborne Lindsell Dodson, Esq., M.C., lately Her Majesty's Consul, Elisabethville.
- Robert Heath Mason, Esq., O.B.E., Foreign Office.
- Willie Morris, Esq., lately Counsellor, Her Majesty's Embassy, Amman.
- Ivor Forsyth Porter, Esq., O.B.E., Permanent United Kingdom Representative to the Council of Europe, Strasbourg.
- John Laurence Pumphrey, Esq., Counsellor, Office of the United Kingdom Commissioner-General for South-East Asia, Singapore.
- Francis Brooks Richards, Esq., D.S.C. and Bar, Counsellor, Her Majesty's Embassy, Paris.
- Oliver Charles Beauchamp St John, Esq., Foreign Office.
- Harold Taplin Shergold, Esq., O.B.E., Foreign Office.
- Arnold Robert Walmsley, Esq., M.B.E., lately Foreign Office.

=== Royal Victorian Order ===
==== Knight Commander of the Royal Victorian Order (KCVO) ====
- Vice-Admiral (Horace) Geoffrey Norman, C.B., C.B.E.

==== Commander of the Royal Victorian Order (CVO) ====
- James Arthur Banks, Esq., O.B.E.
- Brigadier The Right Honourable James Roderick, the Earl of Caithness, C.B.E., D.S.O.
- Miss Gwynedd Margaret Lloyd, M.V.O.
- Major The Right Honourable Patrick Terence William Span, Baron Plunket, M.V.O., Irish Guards.

==== Member of the Royal Victorian Order (MVO) ====
At this time the two lowest classes of the Royal Victorian Order were "Member (fourth class)" and "Member (fifth class)", both with post-nominal letters MVO. "Member (fourth class)" was renamed "Lieutenant" (LVO) from the 1985 New Year Honours onwards.

Fourth Class

- The Reverend Patrick Thomas Ashton.
- David Vincent Griffiths Buchanan, Esq., M.V.O.
- Stephen Langton Forwood, Esq.
- Edmund Frank Grove, Esq., M.V.O.
- Captain David Gordon Roome, Royal Navy.
- The Reverend Edwin Ward.

Fifth Class

- Arthur George Horsley, Esq.
- Miss Muriel Legg.
- Regimental Sergeant-Major John Clifford Lord, M.B.E., Grenadier Guards.
- Donald Morrison, Esq.

=== Order of the British Empire ===
==== Knight Grand Cross of the Order of the British Empire (GBE) ====
- General Sir Harold English Pyman, K.C.B., C.B.E., D.S.O., Colonel Commandant, Royal Armoured Corps, Royal Tank Regiment Wing.

==== Dame Commander of the Order of the British Empire (DBE) ====
- Commandant Jean Davies, O.B.E., Hon. A.D.C., Director, Women's Royal Naval Service.
- Air Commandant Jean Lena Annette Conan Doyle, O.B.E., Women's Royal Air Force.
- Miss Honor Bridget Fell, Director, Strangeways Research Laboratory, Cambridge.
- Madame Alicia Markova, C.B.E. (Miss Alicia Marks). For services to Ballet.
- Miss Barbara Salt, C.B.E., lately Minister, United Kingdom Mission to the United Nations, New York.

==== Knight Commander of the Order of the British Empire (KBE) ====
- Major-General Hamish Manus Campbell, C.B., C.B.E., Royal Army Pay Corps.
- Lieutenant-General Richard Walter Craddock, C.B., C.B.E., D.S.O., late Infantry.
- William Traven Aitken, Esq., M.P., Member of Parliament for Bury St Edmunds since 1950. For political and public services.
- Matthew Campbell, Esq., C.B., Secretary, Department of Agriculture and Fisheries for Scotland.
- Ronald Stanley Edwards, Esq., Chairman, The Electricity Council.
- Albert Henry Mumford, Esq., O.B.E., Engineer-in-Chief, General Post Office.
- George Edgar Vaughan, Esq., C.B.E., Her Majesty's Ambassador Extraordinary and Plenipotentiary in Panama City.
- Sir Percival Joseph Griffiths, C.I.E., President of the India, Pakistan and Burma Association. For services to the British communities in India and Pakistan.
- Sir Henry (Harry) Rudolph Howard, Chairman of the Organising Council for the VIIth British Commonwealth Games, Perth, State of Western Australia.
- Sir Ronald Ormiston Sinclair, President, East African Court of Appeal.
- Brian Allan Marwick, Esq., C.M.G., C.B.E., Resident Commissioner, Swaziland.

==== Commander of the Order of the British Empire (CBE) ====
Military Division

Royal Navy

- Captain James Stephen Dalglish, C.V.O., Royal Navy.
- Captain Colin Charles Harrison Dunlop, Royal 'Navy.
- Surgeon Captain Iain Campbell Macdonald, M.D., Ch.B., F.R.C.P.(Edin.), F.R.F.P.S.(G), Royal Navy.
- Captain Arthur John Brabant Naish, Royal Navy.
- Captain George Dudley Pound, D.S.C., Royal Navy.
- Captain Peter Joseph Wyatt, D.S.C., Royal Navy.
- Commodore James Goddard Young, D.S.C., V.R.D., Royal Naval Reserve.

Army

- Colonel Thomas Howard Acton, O.B.E. (71213), late Infantry.
- Brigadier William Prinsep St. John Becher (44803), late Royal Regiment of Artillery.
- Brigadier Richard Hugh Castellain Bryers (63486), late Infantry.
- Brigadier (temporary) Ronald Edward Coaker, M.C. (378164), late Royal Armoured Corps.
- Brigadier (temporary) Michael Forrester, D.S.O., O.B.E., M.C. (69349), late The Parachute Regiment.
- Brigadier James Merricks Lewis Gavin, O.B.E., late Corps of Royal Engineers.
- Brigadier (temporary) John Belford Arthur Glennie, D.S.O., O.B.E. (63600), late Infantry.
- Colonel Richard John Hardinge Harding-Newman, O.B.E. (49859), late Royal Regiment of Artillery.
- Brigadier (Chief Recruiting Officer) Desmond Norris White Dundas Irven, late Royal Regiment of Artillery (Retired).
- Brigadier James Alastair Harry Mitchell, D.S.O. (47593), late Royal Regiment of Artillery.
- Brigadier George Le Fevre Payne (52707), Royal Army Ordnance Corps.
- Brigadier (now Major General (temporary)) Wilfrid John Potter, O.B.E. (56724), late Royal Army Service Corps.
- Brigadier (temporary) Donald Verner Taylor Q.H.D.S., F .D.S. (67661), late Royal Army Dental Corps.
- Brigadier George Robert Turner-Cain, D.S.O., A.D.C. (50884), late Infantry.
- Colonel Ralph Melville Hector, M.B., D.M.R.D. (85411), late Royal Army Medical Corps; formerly serving with the British Joint Services Training Team, Ghana.

Royal Air Force

- Air Commodore Lewis MacKenzie Crooks, O.B.E., M.B., M.Ch., Royal Air Force.
- Acting Air Commodore Guy Chamberlain Godfrey, M.B.E., Royal Air Force.
- Group Captain John Finch, O.B.E., D.F.C., A.F.C., Royal Air Force.
- Group Captain Francis Edward Frayn, M.B.E., Royal Air Force.
- Group Captain David Abbott Green, D.S.O., O.B.E., D.F.C., Royal Air Force.
- Group Captain David Lawrence Pitt, D.S.O., D.F.C., A.F.C., Royal Air Force.
- Group Captain Frederick James Robinson, O.B.E., D.F.C., Royal Air Force.
- Group Captain Philip Henry Stibbs, Royal Air Force.
- Group Captain Albert Frederick Wallace, O.B.E., D.F.C., Royal Air Force.
- Group Captain Richard David Williams, O.B.E., Royal Air Force.
- Group Captain Gordon Young, Royal Air Force.

Civil Division

- The Right Honourable William Alexander Evering, Baron Amherst of Hackney. For political and public services.
- Michael Leonard Graham Balfour, Esq., O.B.E., Export Publicity and Fairs Officer, Board of Trade.
- Davis Evan Bedford, Esq., M.D., F.R.C.P. Senior Physician, Middlesex Hospital and National Heart Hospital.
- Francis Ernest Herman Bennett, Esq., J.P. For political and public services in London.
- Robert Alexander Polhill Bevan, Esq., O.B.E., Chairman, S. H. Benson Ltd., Advertising Agents.
- Charles Gordon Brand, Esq., Chairman, Charles Brand and Son, Ltd., London.
- John Guthrie Brown, Esq., Consultant Civil Engineer.
- Donald Byford, Esq., Chairman, D. Byford and Company Ltd., Leicester.
- Frank Henry Carr, Esq., Deputy Chief Housing and Planning Inspector, Ministry of Housing and Local Government.
- Arthur William Chapman, Esq., O.B.E., Registrar, University of Sheffield.
- Karl Cyril Cohen, Esq., Councillor, Leeds City and County Borough.
- John Hill Collingridge, Esq., O.B.E., Records Administration Officer, Public Record Office.
- James Bremner Cowper, Esq., Managing Director, British Iron and Steel Corporation Ltd.
- Edward Revill Cullinan, Esq., M.D., F.R.C.P., Honorary Consulting Physician to the Army.
- Group Captain John Cunningham, D.S.O., O.B.E., D.F.C., D.L., Director and Chief Test Pilot, de Havilland Aircraft Company Ltd.
- Alexander Kerr Davidson, Esq., J.P., Convener, Stirlingshire County Council.
- William Douglas, Esq., O.B.E. For political services in Northern Ireland.
- Brian Arthur Cullum Duncan, Esq., M.B.E., Assistant Judge Advocate General, Office of the Judge Advocate General of the Forces.
- Norbert William Durrant, Esq. For political and public services in Bradford.
- Joseph Robert Edwards, Esq., Managing Director, Pressed Steel Company Ltd., Oxford.
- Frank Harvey Evans, Esq., M.V.O., Chief Accountant, Privy Purse Office.
- Trevor Maldwyn Evans, Esq., Industrial Correspondent, " Daily Express ".
- Major David George Ian Alexander Gordon, T.D. For political and public services in Aberdeenshire.
- Milner Connorton Gray, Designer.
- Ernest Michel Guenault, Esq., Deputy Chief Scientific Officer, Safety in Mines Research Establishment, Buxton, Ministry of Power.
- Peter Reginald Frederick Hall, Esq., Director, Royal Shakespeare Company, Stratford-on-Avon and Aldwych Theatre.
- Miss Joan Hood Hammond, O.B.E., Singer.
- Alderman William Hancock. For political and public services in Staffordshire.
- Alderman Joseph William Hardcastle. For political and public services in Scarborough.
- Alfred Harris, Esq., D.S.O. For political services in London.
- Frederick Hayday, Esq., National Industrial Officer, National Union of General and Municipal Workers, Chairman, General Council of the Trades Union Congress.
- Dorothy Veale, Mrs. Haythornthwaite, O.B.E. For political services in the North-West.
- Edward Stanley Hiscocks, Esq., Director, Tropical Products Institute, Department of Scientific and Industrial Research.
- John Reginald Brayley Hodgetts, Esq., Assistant Solicitor, Ministry of Pensions and National Insurance.
- George Bruce Howden, Esq., Chairman, Ulster Transport Authority.
- The Right Honourable Edward Herbert, Baron Jessel, A Deputy Speaker and a Chairman of Committees, House of Lords.
- Hywel Wyn Jones, Esq., Secretary, Welsh Joint Education Committee.
- Miss Mary Elizabeth Judd, O.B.E., Chief Party Assistant to Conservative Chief Whips since 1945.
- John Cowdery Kendrew, Esq. For services to research on the molecular shape of myoglobin.
- Hubert Raymond King, Esq., D.C.M., M.M., Headmaster, Wandsworth Secondary Boys' School, London.
- Reginald John Lethbridge Kingsford, Esq., Secretary to the Syndics of the Cambridge University Press.
- Robert James Kirton, Esq., Chairman, Royal United Kingdom Beneficent Association.
- Henry Jerrold Randall Lane, Esq., Legal Adviser, British Council.
- Anthony Charles Law, Esq., Deputy Chief Scientific Officer, Admiralty Underwater Weapons Establishment, Portland.
- David Lees, Esq., Rector, High School of Glasgow.
- Harald Robert Leslie, Esq., M.B.E., T.D., Q.C., Sheriff of Caithness, Sutherland, Orkney and Zetland.
- Thomas Moffat Logan, Esq., Assistant Secretary, National Assistance Board.
- Richard Valentine Moore, Esq., G.C., Managing Director, Reactor Group, United Kingdom Atomic Energy Authority.
- Ivor Raymond Morris, Esq., Farmer, Gloucestershire. Lately Chairman, Sheep Recording and Progeny Testing Committee.
- Percy Morris, Esq., J.P., Alderman, Swansea County Borough.
- The Right Honourable Priscilla Cecilia Maria, Baroness Norman, J.P., Vice-Chairman, Council of the National Association for Mental Health.
- John Orde, Esq. For political services in Northumberland, Durham and Cumberland.
- Harold Ernest Osborn, Esq., Comptroller, Transport Holding Company.
- Lionel Ernest Conde Osborne, Esq., Crown Estate Surveyor, Crown Estate Office.
- Richard Morris Owen, Esq., Senior Principal Inspector of Taxes, Board of Inland Revenue.
- Ernest Geoffrey Parsons, Esq., Liaison Officer to the Minister of Agriculture, Fisheries and Food for part of the South Western Region.
- Max Ferdinand Perutz, Esq. For services to research on the molecular shape of haemoglobin.
- John Redvers Proudfoot, Esq., General Manager and Secretary, Clyde Navigation Trust.
- William Clark Ramsay, Esq., Honorary Treasurer, Rugby Football Union.
- Ebenezer Mayne Reid, Esq. For services to Agriculture in Northern Ireland.
- Harold Gilbert Reynolds, Esq., O.B.E., Elected Member representing Eastern Region, National Savings Committee.
- Colin Riley, Esq., O.B.E., Vice Chairman and General Manager, General Electric Company (Telecommunications) Ltd., Coventry.
- Professor Alexander Robertson, Director and Professor of Veterinary Hygiene and Preventive Medicine, Royal (Dick) School of Veterinary Studies, University of Edinburgh.
- James Anderson Robertson, Esq., O.B.E.,. Chief Constable, City of Glasgow Police.
- Alfred Esmond Robinson, Esq., O.B.E., M.C., Lately Chairman and Managing Director, British Oil and Cake Mills Ltd.
- William Albert Victor Sanderson, Esq., Assistant Secretary, Ministry of Agriculture for Northern Ireland.
- Frederick Sanger, Esq. For services to research on the molecular structure of protein.
- Bernard Charles Saunders, Esq., Senior Scientific Adviser, Eastern Civil Defence Region.
- Lucien Felix Savournin, Esq., Director of Lands, Ministry of Public Building and Works.
- George Edward Scott, Esq., O.B.E., Chief Constable, West Riding of Yorkshire Constabulary.
- Harry Donald Secombe, Esq., Comedian and Singer. For services to the Army Benevolent Fund.
- John Reginald Sharp, Esq., Joint Governing Director, Lansing Bagnail Ltd. and J. E. Shay Ltd.
- Percival Albert Sheppard, Professor, Department of Meteorology, Imperial College of Science and Technology.
- Colonel Eric Ashley Shipton, O.B.E., M.C., T.D., Member of the Territorial and Auxiliary Forces Association of the County of the City of London.
- Charles Anthony Goodall Simkins, Esq., Attached to the War Office.
- Edgar Charles Bate-Smith, Esq., Director, Low Temperature Research Station, Cambridge, Agricultural Research Council.
- Horace Spibey, Esq., H.M. Inspector of Schools, Ministry of Education.
- Captain Robert Frederick Thomas Stannard, O.B.E., D.S.C., Royal Navy (Retired), Director, London Communications-Electronic Security Agency.
- Basil Ernest Stephenson, Esq., Director of Engineering, Vickers-Armstrongs (Aircraft) Ltd.
- Leonard Thomas George Sully, Esq., Director of Contracts, Air Ministry.
- John Russell Thorlby, Esq. For political and public services in Somerset.
- John Stewart Ellerman Todd, Esq., Public Works Loan Board Commissioner.
- Frederick Gerald Tryhorn, Esq., Forensic Science Adviser, Home Office.
- John Madder Wallace, Esq., Lately Chairman of Board of Governors, Royal Marsden Hospital, London.
- Stanley Tom Ward, Esq. For political and public services in the Isle of Ely and Cambridgeshire.
- Charles Alexander Wells, Esq., M.B., F.R.C.S., Professor of Surgery, University of Liverpool.
- Robert Vaughan Whelpton, Esq., Deputy Chief Scientific Officer, Ministry of Aviation.
- Gabriel Ernest Edward Francis White, Esq., Director of Art, Arts Council of Great Britain.
- Miss Cicely Joan Whittington, O.B.E., Director, Overseas Branches Department, British Red Cross Society.
- Professor Maurice Hugh Frederick Wilkins. For services to research on the structure of the genes.
- Gertrude, Lady Williams, Professor of Social Economics, Bedford College, University of London.
- Godfrey Hamilton Williams, Esq., Assistant Secretary, War Office.
- George Cedric Wilson, Esq., O.B.E., Member of the White Fish Authority and of the Herring Industry Board.
- Harold Edward Wincott, Esq., Editor-in-Chief, The Investors' Chronicle.
- Frederick Thomas Winter, Esq., National Hunt Jockey.
- Frank Bede Young, Esq., M.B.E., Chairman of the Council, Rural District Councils Association of England and Wales.
- William Young, Esq., Engineer Surveyor-in-Chief, Marine Survey, Ministry of Transport.
- Basil Franklin Dyson, British subject resident in Italy.
- Roger Packman Hinks, British Council Representative, France.
- George Hodson, British subject resident in Switzerland.
- Patrick Murdoch Johnston, Her Majesty's Ambassador Extraordinary and Plenipotentiary in Managua.
- Lieutenant-Colonel Desmond George McCaully, O.B.E., M.B., B.Ch., Senior Medical Officer, Trucial States.
- Donald MacFarlane, Her Majesty's Consul-General, Frankfurt.
- The Very Reverend George Herbert Martin, O.B.E., Provost of All Saints' Cathedral, Khartoum, and Archdeacon of the Northern Sudan, Aden Colony and Protectorate, Ethiopia and Somalia.
- Miss Kathleen May Palmer Smith, British subject resident in Iran.
- Cyril Harrison (businessman), President of the Confederation of British Industry.
- Thomas Stuart Tull, D.S.O., O.B.E., Her Majesty's Consul-General, Philadelphia
- Harold Edward Albiston, Director of the Veterinary Research Institute, State of Victoria.
- Frank Darcy Harmer Beames, Deputy Chairman of the Organising Council for the Vllth British Commonwealth Games, Perth, State of Western Australia.
- Brian Herbert Bednall, Conservator of Forests, State of South Australia.
- Kenneth Anthony Blacker, Commissioner for Lands Legislation, Federation of Malaya.
- Arthur Haydn Peter Cardew, Deputy General Manager, Central Electricity Board, Federation of Malaya.
- Arthur George Stening Cooper, M.B., Ch.M., of Brisbane, State of Queensland. For services in the field of cancer research and treatment.
- David Kingsley Daniels, O.B.E., Secretary-General, The Royal Commonwealth Society.
- Andrew Henry Earley, O.B.E., E.R.D., an Assistant General Manager, East African Railways and Harbours.
- John Roland Elliott, Professor of Classics, University of the State of Tasmania.
- Phyllis Irene, Mrs. Frost, J.P., formerly President of the National Council of Women of the State of Victoria.
- Arnold Lessel MacMorland Greig, Surveyor-General, Federation of Malaya.
- John Lister Llewellyn, O.B.E. For services to the British community in India.
- The Honourable Stanley Evan Parry, Member of the Legislative Council of the State of New South Wales, 1940-1952. For services to the community.
- William Edmond Ryan, Solicitor-General, State of Queensland.
- Eric John Underwood, Professor of Agriculture and Director, Institute of Agriculture, University of the State of Western Australia.
- Robert Keith Yorston, O.B.E., President of the Australian-American Association in the State of New South Wales

==== Officer of the Order of the British Empire (OBE) ====
Royal Air Force

- Wing Commander Alan William Bower, D.F.C. (80435), Royal Air Force.
- Wing Commander Arthur Farrer Boyd, D.F.C. (123097), Royal Air Force.
- Wing Commander Frederick Thomas Brain (109604), Royal Air Force (Retired).
- Wing Commander Paul Cadman (51439), Royal Air Force.
- Wing Commander Alfred Gascoyne Clennett, M.B.E. (46234), Royal Air Force.
- Wing Commander James Corbishley, A.F.C. (501774), Royal Air Force.
- Wing Commander Francis Bowen-Easley (151649), Royal Air Force.
- Wing Commander Tom Edwards (142989), Royal Air Force.
- Wing Commander Kenneth William Haynes (56893), Royal Air Force.
- Wing Commander Frank Sydney Roland Johnson (143244), Royal Air Force.
- Wing Commander Albert Mackelden (46860), Royal Air Force.
- Wing Commander Eric Robert Madger (57758), Royal Air Force.
- Wing Commander Ian Maurice Pedder, D.F.C. (57637), Royal Air Force.
- Wing Commander Raymond Marcus McKenzie Pratt, M.R.C.S., L.R.C.P. (59965), Royal Air Force.
- Wing Commander Edward William Donald Roy, D.F.C. (47533), Royal Air Force.
- Wing Commander Gerard Francis Turnbull, M.B.E., A.F.C. (195913), Royal Air Force.
- Acting Wing Commander Patrick George Chichester (17241), Royal Air Force Volunteer Reserve (Training Branch).
- Acting Wing Commander Charles John Edwards (57860), Royal Air Force.
- Squadron Leader Robert Nuttall (147034), Royal Air Force.

Civil Division

- Desmond Hawkins
- Udolphus Aylmer Coates, Esq., O.B.E, County Planning Officer, Lancashire.
- William Marr, Esq., City Assessor, Edinburgh.

==== Member of the Order of the British Empire (MBE) ====
Military Division

Army

- 22510465 Warrant Officer Class I James Armstrong, The Parachute Regiment, Territorial Army.
- Major Tom Armstrong, T.D. (269412), The Black Watch (Royal Highland Regiment), Territorial Army.
- Lieutenant (Quartermaster) Alfred Frederick Austin (472691), Royal Regiment of Artillery.
- Major (acting) Robert Bryan Bertram, T.D. (47737), Combined Cadet Force.
- Major (Quartermaster) George William Blake (427516), The Devonshire and Dorset Regiment.
- Major Ronald Brammall, T.D. (276356), The Parachute Regiment, Territorial Army.
- W/64723 Warrant Officer Class II Lily Brooks, Women's Royal Army Corps.
- Lieutenant Robert Cecil Brown (473486), General List.
- Major Vincent Butterworth (356385), Royal Army Ordnance Corps.
- Major (Quartermaster) John Patrick Cairns (401855), Royal Corps of Signals (now R.A.R.O.).
- 22207453 Warrant Officer Class I Thomas William Cameron, Royal Regiment of Artillery, Territorial Army.
- 1877373 Warrant Officer Class I (acting) George Albert Constable, Corps of Royal Engineers.
- Captain (Quartermaster) Reginald John Crane (457020), The Parachute Regiment.
- Major John Philip Cross (339928), 7th Duke of Edinburgh's Own Gurkha Rifles.
- Major (Quartermaster) James Cullen (414648), The Welch Regiment (now retired).
- Captain (acting) John Dring (298821), Army Cadet Force.
- Major (temporary) Stanley James Duncombe (378597), Corps of Royal Electrical and Mechanical Engineers.
- 19137664 Warrant Officer Class II Ernest Arthur Durey, Corps of Royal Engineers.
- 2615691 Warrant Officer Class I Robert Edward Ellis, Corps of Royal Military Police.
- Captain (Quartermaster) William Michael Estridge (463274), The Royal Ulster Rifles.
- Major Richard Michael Everard (383865), Royal Tank Regiment, Royal Armoured Corps.
- Major (acting) John Forbes (340991), Army Cadet Force.
- Major Arthur Brian James Forman (393133), Army Air Corps.
- Major John Patrick Groom (403475), Corps of Royal Engineers.
- Major (temporary) John Hammond Hanscombe (349429), 3rd Green Jackets, The Rifle Brigade (now retired).
- W/1201 Warrant Officer Class II Freda Marjorie Hunt, Women's Royal Army Corps.
- 22221025 Warrant Officer Class II John Douglas Jacobs, Honourable Artillery Company, Territorial Army.
- Captain (acting) Edgar Percy Jennings (361649), Combined Cadet Force.
- 21012285 Warrant Officer Class II Albert Jack Jeynes, The Worcestershire Regiment, Territorial Army.
- Major Sydney Charles Royston Jones (265559), Corps of Royal Engineers.
- Major (Q.G.O.) Kishanbahadur Thapa, I.D.S.M. (388587), 2nd King Edward VII's Own Gurkha Rifles (The Sirmoor Rifles).
- 22220806 Warrant Officer Class I (Bandmaster) Arthur Lambeth, Royal Corps of Signals, Territorial Army.
- Major Cyril Thomas George Lowe (167142), Royal Army Ordnance Corps.
- Major Peter Michael McGahey (369828), The Staffordshire Regiment (The Prince of Wales's).
- 2928895 Warrant Officer Class I John Archibald Maclellan, Queen's Own Highlanders (Sea- forth and Camerons).
- Major (Quartermaster) Ronald George Joseph McPherson (378367), Royal Regiment of Artillery.
- Major George Meredith (200200), Royal Army Pay Corps.
- Major John Arscott Molesworth-St. Aubyn (362036), 2nd Green Jackets, The King's Royal Rifle Corps.
- Major Christopher William Duthie Morgan (373317), The Royal Scots Greys (2nd. Dragoons), Royal Armoured Corps.
- Captain Albert Victor Norris (303991), Royal Regiment of Artillery, Territorial Army.
- Major (mow Lieutenant-Colonel (temporary)) Geoffrey Raymond Ottey (328741), The Queen's Royal Irish Hussars, Royal Armoured Corps.
- Major Betty Paget-Clarke (223873), Women's Royal Army Corps (now R.A.R.O.).
- 23882262 Warrant Officer Class II William George Henry Race, The Suffolk and Cambridgeshire Regiment, Territorial Army.
- Wakil Qaid Awal Abdo Mohammed Saad (2739), Federal Regular Army (Aden).
- S/54960 Warrant Officer Class I Leslie Scott, Royal Army Service Corps.
- S/5120568 Warrant Officer Class I Kenneth James Skipper, Royal Army Service Corps.
- Captain Gordon Sydney Pearson Stead (444350), Corps of Royal Military Police, Territorial Army.
- 750240 Warrant Officer Class II William Arthur Story, Royal Regiment of Artillery, Territorial Army.
- 222296692 Warrant Officer Class I Victor Fortune McLaglan Thom, Royal Corps of Signals.
- Major (Quartermaster) Herbert George Turner (414292), The Royal Ulster Rifles.
- Major Bernard John Uunderbill (371456), Royal Regiment of Artillery.
- 5253250 Warrant Officer Class I Thomas Adrian Vaughan, Royal Corps of Signals.
- 2717835 Warrant Officer Class I Barnard Frederick John Wild, Irish Guards.
- Major (temporary) Keith Stephen Barnard Wintle (412103), Royal Regiment of Artillery.
- Major (temporary) (now Captain) (Technical Instructor in Gunnery) John Ernest Wright (421549), Royal Regiment of Artillery.
- Captain George Andrew Young (427041), Royal Horse Artillery.

Royal Air Force

- Squadron Leader Ronald Gordon Ashford (502253), Royal Air Force.
- Squadron Leader Ronald Winwood Ayre (134176), Royal Air Force.
- Squadron Officer Grace Penelope Barrett (6726), Women's Royal Air Force.
- Squadron Leader James Gerard Brodie, A.F.C. (189396), Royal Air Force.
- Squadron Leader George Frederick Campodonic (51613), Royal Air Force.
- Squadron Leader Ernest Chelmick (54202), Royal Air Force.
- Squadron Leader Kenneth Boyd Childs (202486), Royal Air Force.
- Squadron Leader Arthur Herbert Cowton (165013), Royal Air Force.
- Squadron Leader (Acting Wing Commander) Alexander William Culmer (180371), Royal Air Force.
- Squadron Leader Gerald Raymond Edenbrow (166294), Royal Air Force.
- Squadron Leader Jack Fennell (180109), Royal Air Force.
- Squadron Leader Norman John Gardner (1867728), Royal Air Force.
- Squadron Leader Abraham Garretts (202936), Royal Air Force.
- Squadron Leader Thomas William George Godfrey, D.F.C. (68176), Royal Air Force.
- Squadron Leader Peter Scott Goffey (53036), Royal Air Force.
- Squadron Leader Sylvan Gerald Head (202526), Royal Air Force.
- Squadron Leader Robert James Hutchinson (173739), Royal Air Force (Retired).
- Squadron Leader Hugh Pulman-Jones (105789), Royal Air Force.
- Squadron Leader James Dennis Jones (579438), Royal Air Force.
- Squadron Leader Charles Henry Lang (46147), Royal Air Force.
- Squadron Leader Alfred William Lionel Mahon (53154), Royal Air Force.
- Squadron Leader Derrick George Albert Melrose (145799), Royal Air Force.
- Squadron Leader Cyril Robert Milam (572887), Royal Air Force.
- Squadron Leader David Cansdale Mitchell (168489), Royal Air Force.
- Squadron Officer Josephine Mullen (3034), Women's Royal Air Force.
- Squadron Leader William Joseph Norfolk (149248), Royal Air Force.
- Squadron Leader Arthur Price, D.F.C. (83299), Royal Air Force.
- Squadron Leader John Edward Sewell (3500310), Royal Air Force.
- Squadron Leader Keith Vere Nye Stevens (012883), Royal Australian Air Force.
- Squadron Leader Herbert Leonard Tucker (142812), Royal Air Force.
- Squadron Leader Leonard Thomas Walton, D.F.C. (185206), Royal Air Force.
- Acting Squadron Leader Gerald William Edwards (103436), Royal Air Force Volunteer Reserve (Training Branch).
- Flight Lieutenant Charles John Broom (1339174), Royal Air Force.
- Flight Lieutenant Brian Cook (85099), Royal Auxiliary Air Force.
- Flight Lieutenant Albert Denis Knight (568489), Royal Air Force.
- Flight Lieutenant Walter William John Le Count (514457), Royal Air Force.
- Flight Lieutenant Ernest Kenneth Speller (504308), Royal Air Force.
- Acting Flight Lieutenant George Mylrea Quayle (68509), Royal Air Force Volunteer Reserve (Training Branch).
- Warrant Officer William George Balchin Baird (516764), Royal Air Force.
- Warrant Officer Albert Cross (534022), Royal Air Force.
- Warrant Officer Edward George Ellis, B.E.M. (527410), Royal Air Force.
- Warrant Officer Wesley Pearce Haley (567584), Royal Air Force.
- Warrant Officer Eric Somme Keenor (518911), Royal Air Force.
- Warrant Officer William Godman Nice (564069), Royal Air Force.
- Warrant Officer Kenneth Jack Joseph Shaw (518588), Royal Air Force.

Civil Division

- Miss Marion Cleland Lochhead, Literary writer in the Scottish Press.
- Miss Anita Lonsbrough, Swimmer.
