= Elizabeth Eastlake =

English writer

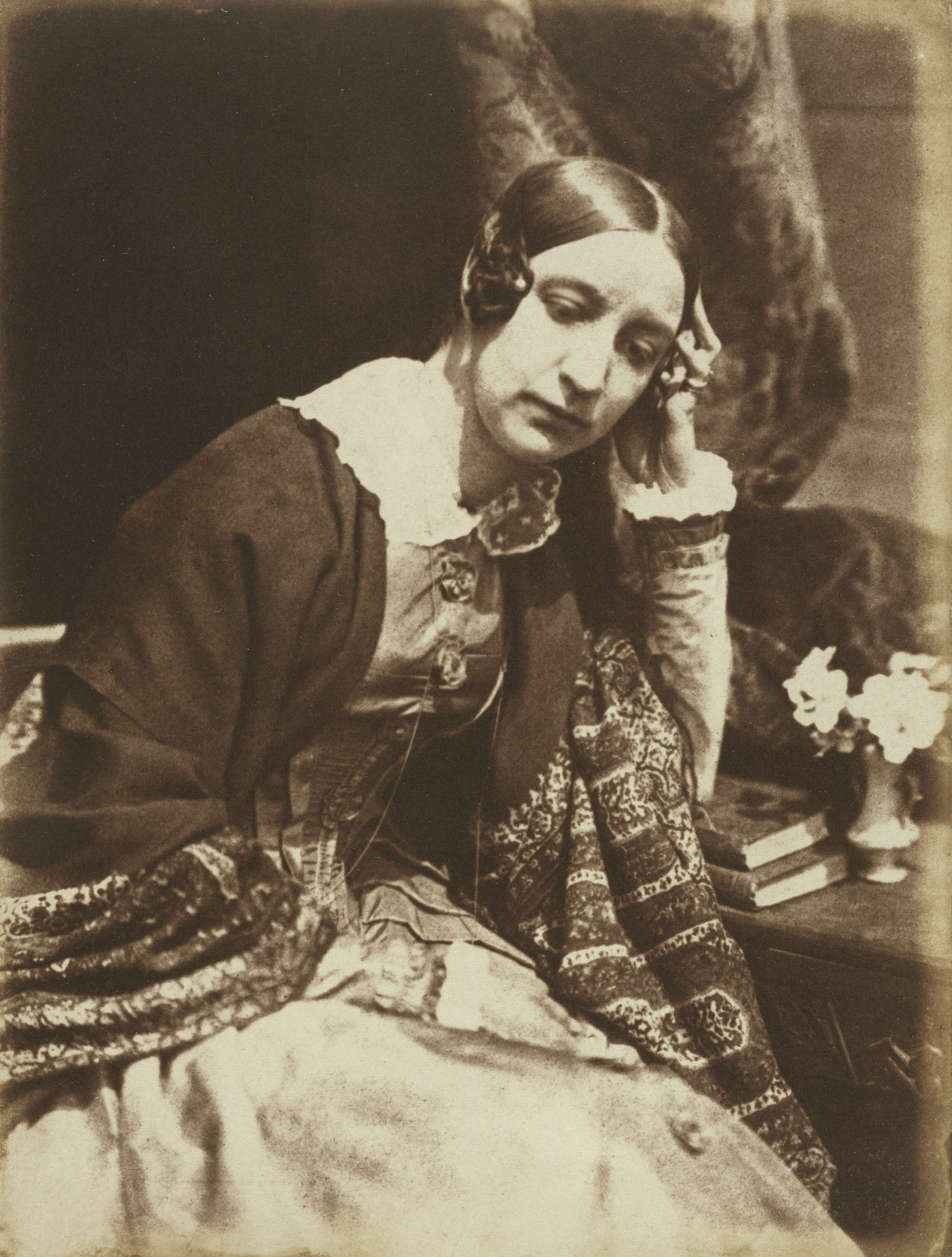
- Elizabeth Rigby, the future Lady Eastlake, photographed about 1847 by Hill & Adamson
- Born: Elizabeth Rigby; 17 November 1809; Norwich, Norfolk, England, United Kingdom
- Died: 1 October 1893 (aged 83)
- Known for: Art criticism
- Spouse: Sir Charles Lock Eastlake

Elizabeth, Lady Eastlake (17 November 1809 – 2 October 1893), born Elizabeth Rigby, was an English author, art critic and art historian who made regular contributions to the Quarterly Review. She is known for her writing and her significant role in the London art world.

== Life ==
Elizabeth Eastlake was born in Norwich into the large family of Edward and Anne Rigby. Her father, a physician and classical scholar, and her mother included her in their social life and conversations with prominent citizens and intellectuals.

From a young age, Eastlake was fond of drawing and continued studying art into her twenties, when she was taught to draw and etch by the artist Edward Daniell. She was privately educated and learned French and Italian, however after an illness in 1827 she convalesced in Germany and Switzerland. She stayed two years and started a lifetime of publication with a translation of Johann David Passavant's essay on English art. A second trip to Germany in 1835 led to an article on Goethe. After travelling to Russia and Estonia to visit a married sister, her published letters and her travel book A Residence on the Shores of the Baltic (1841) led to an invitation to write for the Quarterly Review by editor John Gibson Lockhart.

In 1842, her widowed mother Anne moved with her daughters to Edinburgh. There Eastlake's literary career brought entry to an intellectual social circle including prominent figures such as Lord Jeffrey, John Murray and David Octavius Hill. Robert Adamson, assisted by Hill, photographed her in a series of about 20 early calotypes.

Despite a diary entry in 1846 saying there were many "compensations" for unmarried women, three years later, at the age of 40, she married the artist, art historian and critic Sir Charles Lock Eastlake. He was the first Director of the National Gallery in London and in 1853 became the first president of the Photographic Society. She joined him in an active working and social life, entertaining artists such as Landseer and mixing with a wide range of well-known people, including Lord Macaulay, Anna Jameson and Ada Lovelace. Her habit of continental travel continued through the 1850s and 1860s as she and her husband toured several European countries in search of new acquisitions for the gallery.

== Writings on art ==
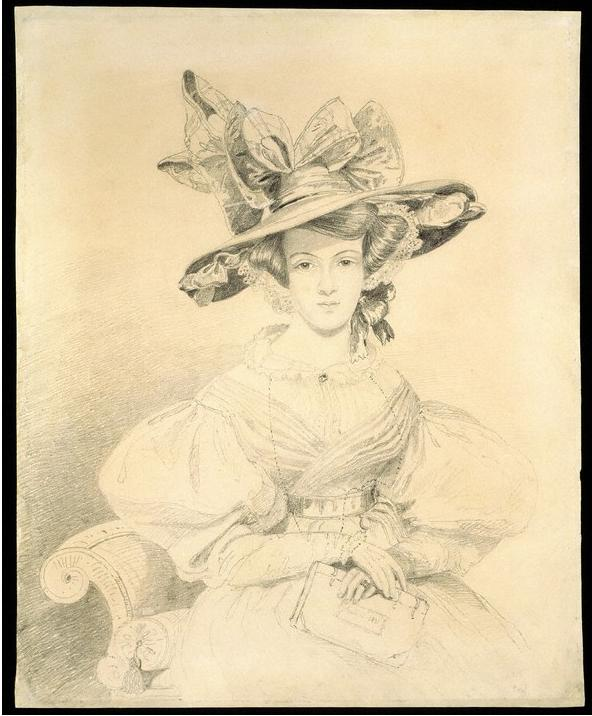
Lady Elizabeth Eastlake, portrait sketch, 1831, Victoria & Albert Museum

Eastlake wrote extensively about art. Julie Sheldon in The Letters of Elizabeth Rigby, Lady Eastlake has compiled a full bibliography.

Some highlights are:

Reviews of Vanity Fair and Jane Eyre, in the Quarterly Review vol. 84, 1848 – notorious for her critical view of Jane Eyre. She disputed the morality of the novel, writing that ‘the popularity of Jane Eyre is a proof how deeply the love for illegitimate romance is implanted in our nature’ and summarising with ‘It is a very remarkable book: we have no remembrance of another combining such genuine power with such horrid taste’.

Music and the Art of Dress, an 1852 book containing two of her previous Quarterly Review essays on these topics

Modern Painters, in the Quarterly Review, vol. 98, 1856 – a long in-depth critical review of John Ruskin's aesthetic theory. She rejected his "fundamental false principle" that "the language of painting is invaluable as the vehicle of thought, but by itself nothing". She replied that each art (e.g. painting) has to do what only it can do and that "the more of art the less of superadded thought will a picture be found capable of containing". Ruskin has confused poetry and painting: whereas poetry uses signs to express thought, painting depicts things.

Photography, in the Quarterly Review, vol. 101, 1857, is one of the earliest commentaries on the photographic art form. Some have argued that she denies 'works of light' a place among the fine arts. She claims that photography mechanically reproduces details without judgement, yet it is more precise and accurate than the human eye and here "the much-lauded and much-abused agent called Photography takes her legitimate stand". "For everything for which Art has hitherto been the means, but not the end, photography is the allotted agent", which can leave art freer to become more truly artistic.

The History of Our Lord, 1864, her completion of the last two volumes of the Sacred and Legendary Art book series by her late friend Anna Jameson.

Amongst her other writings are pieces on Madame de Stael, Anna Jameson, the Royal Female School of Art, Kaspar Hauser, Raphael, Michelangelo, Titian, Leonardo da Vinci, and Dürer. The last five became the subjects of her book Five Great Painters (1883).

She helped disseminate German art history in England, both as critic and as translator of (Waagen and Kugler). She sometimes collaborated with her husband Charles Eastlake, and she wrote a memoir of him after his death in 1865.

In 1895 her nephew Charles Eastlake Smith edited her Letters and Correspondence.

== Reputation ==
In the 20th century, she was remembered mostly for Photography and her review of Jane Eyre. Her criticism of John Ruskin has been linked to her role as confidante to his estranged wife, Effie Gray. According to historian Rosemary Mitchell, however, her work as art historian and writer was significant and original. Mitchell considers Eastlake to have been a scholarly and perceptive critic, and Marion Lochhead regards Eastlake as a 'pioneer of feminine journalism'.

She is considered to be one of the most important female 19th-century art historians along with Anna Jameson and Emilia Dilke.

More critically, Janice Schroeder decries her values supporting women's subordinate place in the class structure within British imperialism.

== In popular culture ==
Eastlake is portrayed by Emma Thompson in the film Effie Gray (2014). The film script was written by Thompson.

== Works ==
- A Residence on the Shores of the Baltic (1841); London, 1844. OCLC 315701533
- Review of Jane Eyre by Eizabeth Rigby
- Music and The Art of Dress, two essays reprinted from the Quarterly Review (1852)
- Livonian Tales: The Disponent, The Wolves, The Jewess By the Author of Letters from the Baltic New York: Harper & Brothers. 1856. Fragile tan wrappers. No. 85 - Library of Select Novels
- Photography 1857
- 60 drawings by Elizabeth Rigby from the Tate Gallery
- The history of Our Lord as exemplified in works of art (1890)
- Baltische briefe...(Leipzig, F.A. Brockhaus, 1846)
- Journals and correspondence of Lady Eastlake (London, J. Murray, 1895)

== See also ==
- Anna Brownell Jameson
- John Gibson
