= C. Irving Benson =

Clarence Irving Benson (1 December 1897 – 6 December 1980), generally referred to as Irving Benson or C. Irving Benson, was an Australian Methodist minister, a long-serving pastor of Wesley Church, Melbourne, and superintendent of the Central Mission, Melbourne. He was knighted in 1963, the first Methodist minister to be so honored.

== History ==
Benson was born in Hull, (Note: Joseph Orton, founder of Methodism in Melbourne, was also born in Hull.) Yorkshire, son of Walter Benson and his wife Mary Benson, née Mear.

In 1916 he trained as a lay missionary at Cliff College, which institution had been supplying Methodist clergy to Australia since 1907. Responding to his request for country experience, he was sent to Hamilton, supervised by Rev. H. J. Cocks (died 1921). At the 1918 Conference, Benson was accepted for training.

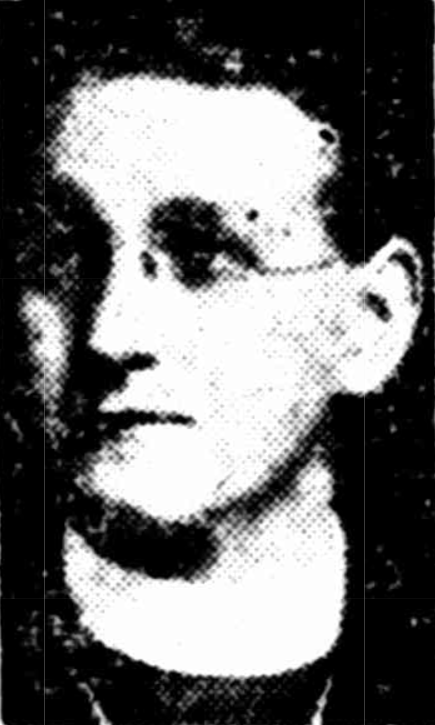
C. Irving Benson

In 1918 he took charge of the Toorak church, which had been kept moribund by its debt of £3700. Benson restructured the debt, and by his brilliant oratory and thoughtful sermons, reversed the trend. Soon the pews were full to overflowing and the church prospered. Benson, who had received lucrative offers from America, was happy in the service, but after five years' service the Methodist constitution (itinerant principle: section IV, No. 117) demanded that he move to another circuit. Toorak's church fathers petitioned for their church to be redefined as a Mission, which would make it exempt, and they would not be required to accept a replacement. The ploy was supported by Benson's mentor W. H. Fitchett but refused by Conference, who feared that an unhealthy precedent would be created. Benson had made no attempt to increase church membership; he had "created a congregation, not built a church".

In April 1923 he took his next charge, on Albion Street, Brunswick, but his fame had spread: in September 1924 he was invited to South Australia, to conduct the anniversary service of the Methodist church at Malvern, a genteel suburb of Adelaide. He conducted three services on the day, to overflowing congregations.

In 1926 he was called by Conference to take over preaching duties at the Central Mission, where the superintendent S. J. Hoban had collapsed due to the pressure of work.

He paid a return visit to the Malvern church in Adelaide, and in May 1927 preached at the anniversary service of Central Mission, Sydney. Hoban died in 1931, showered with praise from Benson, H. H. Williams, the Conference President and J. H. Cain, Assistant Superintendent of the Central Mission. Cain succeeded Hoban as superintendent of the Central Mission, then Benson in 1933, when Cain retired. Melbourne was suffering the depths of the Great Depression and the Central Mission, as Victoria's premier charitable body, had great demands on its services.

Benson was introduced by Ivan Menzies to Moral Re-Armament and the Oxford Group, whose four moral absolutes of: honesty, purity, unselfishness, and love could save the world, but was too late to prevent the impending world war. He admired Churchill and made him the subject of lectures.

He retired, or resigned in 1970, succeeded as president of Central Mission, by reformist Rev. Arthur Preston. (Note: His departure was seen by some as the toppling of another bastion of Melburnian respectability, along with the relaxation of licensing laws, the rise of Bob Hawke, emergence of Dr Bertram Wainer's Abortion Law Reform League, the popularity of Keith Dunstan's book Wowsers and Mary McCarthy's The Group, also plays like The Boys in the Band and Oh! Calcutta!.)

He died in 1980 and his remains were buried in the Brighton General Cemetery.

== Journalism ==
In 1923 the Melbourne Herald began a weekly causerie column by Benson entitled "Church and People", gossip from the various churches of Melbourne and elsewhere. The column, which was praised for its ecumenism, gives some insight into Benson's breadth of intellect, was still running in 1948 and ended in 1979. In 1943 he claimed to have been for 24 years religious editor for the (Melbourne) Herald.

== Radio ==
In May 1926 he began conducting the "Pleasant Sunday Afternoon" (P.S.A.) broadcasts, which began in 1924 from Wesley Church on radio station 3LO. ABC management decided in 1942 to cease broadcasting P.S.A., on the grounds that it was conferring a monopoly on one section of the community. He also had a regular spot from 1930 on 3AR or 3LO: "Questions and Answers", responding to listeners' problems relating to morals, ethics, theology and the Bible. Both this and P.S.A. were carried over from the days before the Australian Broadcasting Commission took over those stations. Wesley Church then came to an arrangement with 3DB to take over the P.S.A. broadcasts but not "Questions and Answers".

== Publications ==
Benson published several books and numerous booklets:

- C. Irving Benson, ed. (1935) A Century of Victorian Methodism 504pp Spectator Publishing Company

Not available online:

- C. Irving Benson, (1931) The craft of prayer : a little book on how to master the art of praying
- C. Irving Benson, (1932) The craft of finding God : a little guide book for pilgrims of the quest that crowns life
- C. Irving Benson, (1935) John Wesley, the founder of Methodism : how Methodism was born (first chapter of A Century of Victorian Methodism)
- C. Irving Benson, (1936) The Eight Points of the Oxford Group
- C. Irving Benson, (1949) Methodist crusaders that swept Australia
- C. Irving Benson, (1965) The Man with the Donkey
- C. Irving Benson, () I Follow the Road (3 pp.) held by Moore Theological College
- F. W. Boreham, (1961) The last milestone: essays; with a biographical essay by C. I. Benson

== Selected articles ==
- Church and People, 6 January 1923 First of his many columns under this heading
- Church and People 12 December 1942 Tribute to Dr Fitchett
- Church and People 10 August 1946 Praise for Catholicism from both Benson and Einstein

== Recognition ==
- Benson was made Doctor of Divinity (D.D.) by the University of Toronto (Note: Two of his predecessors at the Central Mission, Alex McCallum and S. J. Hoban, were similarly honored.) in 1939.
- Benson was awarded an OBE in the 1951 Birthday Honours and CBE in the 1961 New Year Honours.
- He was appointed Knight Bachelor in the 1963 Birthday Honours. He has been instanced as the first Methodist minister anywhere to be so honored.

== Family ==
On 14 April 1919 Benson married Agnes Lyell ( – 8 July 1947) of The Esplanade, St Kilda. They had three daughters

- Mary Montague Benson (March 1920 – ) married William Rodney Trahair on 13 April 1944.
- Shirley Benson married Allen Home of Murrumbeena on 14 September 1951.
- Inez "Toodles" Benson

He married again on 30 December 1967 to Marjorie Ruth Featonby, daughter of William R. Featonby, a Methodist minister.

Benson had two brothers: John William Benson and George Walter Benson, both killed while serving with the British Navy in WWI.
