= Harold Hall (civil servant) =

English cricketer and British Army officer (1913–2004)

Personal information
- Full name: Harold Percival Hall
- Born: 9 September 1913; Murree, Punjab, British India
- Died: 20 October 2004 (aged 91); Bournemouth, Dorset, England
- Batting: Right-handed
- Bowling: Right-arm medium

Domestic team information
- Years: Team
- 1940/41: Europeans

Career statistics
Competition	First-class
Matches	1
Runs scored	25
Batting average	25.00
100s/50s	–/–
Top score	14*
Balls bowled	180
Wickets	2
Bowling average	41.50
5 wickets in innings	–
10 wickets in match	–
Best bowling	2/83
Catches/stumpings	–/–
- Source: ESPNcricinfo, 4 December 2021

Harold Percival Hall CMG MBE (9 September 1913 – 20 October 2004) was an English first-class cricketer, British Indian Army officer and civil servant.

The son of Major George Charles Hall, he was born in British India at Murree in September 1913. He was educated in England at Portsmouth Grammar School, before attending the Royal Military College, Sandhurst. He graduated from Sandhurst as a second lieutenant into the unattached list of the British Indian Army in August 1933, before being appointed to the Indian Army in November 1934. Hall was appointed to the 3rd battalion, 15th Punjab Regiment and later transferred to the Indian Political Service in 1937, staying with the service throughout the Second World War.

During this period Hall played first-class cricket, making a single appearance for the Europeans cricket team against the Rest of India at Bombay in December 1940. Batting twice in the match, he ended the Europeans first innings unbeaten on 14 runs, while following-on in their second innings he was promoted to open the batting alongside Herbert Barritt, scoring 11 runs before being dismissed by Vijay Hazare. With his right-arm medium pace bowling, he dismissed Maurice Cohen and Sheshil Arolkar in the Rest of India's only innings of the match, finishing with figures of 2 for 83 from 30 overs.

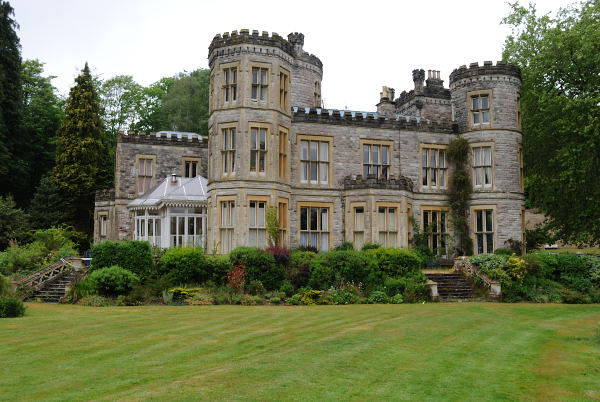
Avon Castle near Ringwood, where Hall retired to in later life.

At the time of the Partition of India in 1947, he had been appointed Viceroy's Agent to Lord Mountbatten. Prior to his appointment as Viceroy's Agent, Hall had concurrently held the posts of Director of Food Supplies and Deputy Secretary for Revenue for Baluchistan, for which he recognised by being appointed a MBE in the 1947 Birthday Honours. He was appointed by the Commonwealth Office to Kenya Colony during the Mau Mau Uprising in the 1950s, in addition to British Mauritius, where he helped to broker a power-sharing agreement which was later used as a model for power-sharing arrangements in Northern Ireland. Hall was seconded to the Reid Commission in 1956, which was responsible for drafting the Constitution of Malaysia prior to Malayan independence from Britain in 1957. He later chaired the inter-governmental committee of Malaya, North Borneo and Sarawak which led to the formation of Malaysia in 1963. He additionally served as British Deputy High Commissioner for Eastern Malaysia from 1963 to 1964. For his service in Malaysia, Hall was made a Companion of the Order of St Michael and St George in the 1963 Birthday Honours. He left the Commonwealth Office in 1968, becoming an assistant undersecretary of state at the Ministry of Defence until 1973. From there he became director of studies at the Royal Institute of Public Administration from 1974 to 1985.

After retiring, he settled with his wife, Margery, at Avon Castle on the banks of the River Avon in Hampshire. Hall died at the Royal Bournemouth Hospital in October 2004. He was survived by his wife and two of their three sons.
