= Jeffrey Rowbotham =

Scottish architect (1920–1984)

Jeffrey Rowbotham ARIBA
- Born: 23 August 1920
- Died: 1 March 1984 (aged 63)
- Education: Glasgow School of Art
- Spouse: Beryl Rowbotham

Jeffrey Rowbotham, ARIBA (23 August 1920 – 1 March 1984) was a Scottish architect.

== Life ==
From February to August 1939, Rowbotham was an apprentice for James M Monro & Son. In September 1939, he started a diploma course at Glasgow School of Art. From June 1941 to September 1943 he continued working as an apprentice this time for Thomas Smith Cordiner. In 1945, he was awarded his diploma and passed the professional practice exam. Around this time, he joined the Clyde Valley Regional Planning Advisory Committee. In 1946, he was elected ARIBA, his proposers being William James Smith, Patrick Abercrombie and Alexander Wright. In 1971, he became County Planning officer for Lancashire County Council after the retirement of Udolphus Aylmer Coates.

Rowbotham retired in 1983 and died a year later, at the age of 63.
