= Wesley Church, Melbourne =

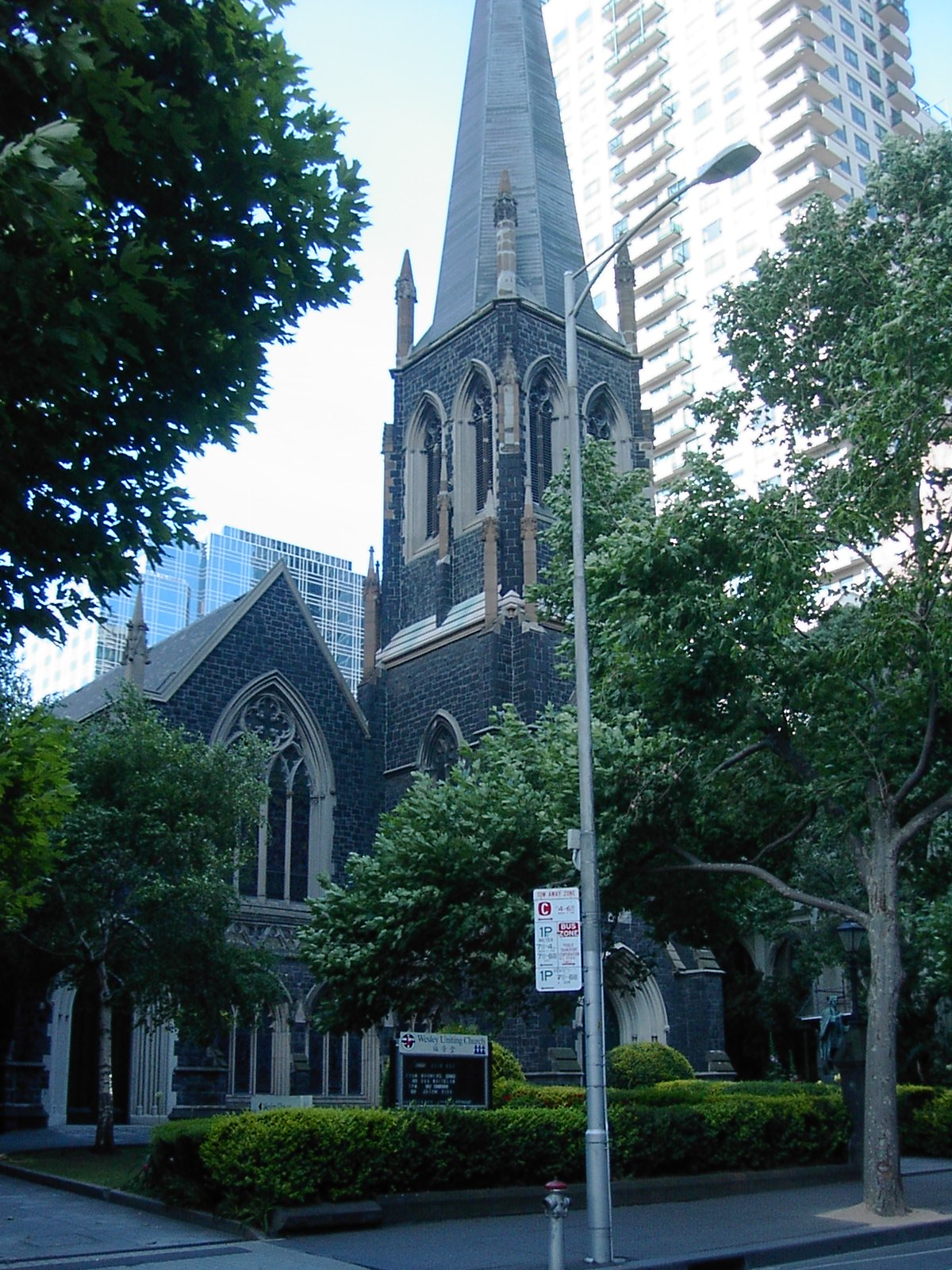
- Wesley Church, Melbourne

- Location of the church in Melbourne
- Wesley Church, Melbourne
- 37°48′37″S 144°58′5″E
- Location: Lonsdale Street, Melbourne, Victoria
- Country: Australia
- Denomination: Uniting (since 1977)
- Previous denomination: Wesleyan (1857 – 1902); Methodist (1902 – 1977)
- Website: wesleychurch.org.au

History
- Status: Church
- Founded: 2 December 1857
- Dedication: John Wesley
- Consecrated: 26 August 1858

Architecture
- Functional status: Active
- Architect: Joseph Reed
- Architectural type: Church
- Style: English Gothic

Specifications
- Capacity: 800 people
- Length: 50.3 m (165 ft)
- Width: 23.5 m (77 ft)
- Materials: Basalt bluestone; slate

Victorian Heritage Register
- Official name: Wesley Church Complex
- Type: Registered place
- Designated: 9 October 1974
- Reference no.: H0012
- Heritage overlay no.: HO712
- Category: Religion

The Wesley Church is a Uniting church in the city centre of Melbourne, in Victoria, Australia. The Wesley Church was built as the central church of the Wesleyan movement in Victoria. It is named after John Wesley (1703–1791), the founder of Methodism. The Wesley Church is the home of two Uniting congregations, the English-speaking Wesley Church, and the Chinese-speaking Gospel Hall.

In 1902, the Wesleyan Church in Australia combined with four other churches to form the Methodist Church of Australasia. In 1977, the Methodist, Presbyterian and Congregational Churches further combined to form the Uniting Church.

The church building and associated structures were added to the Victorian Heritage Register on 9 October 1974 in recognition of their historical, architectural and social significance.

== History ==
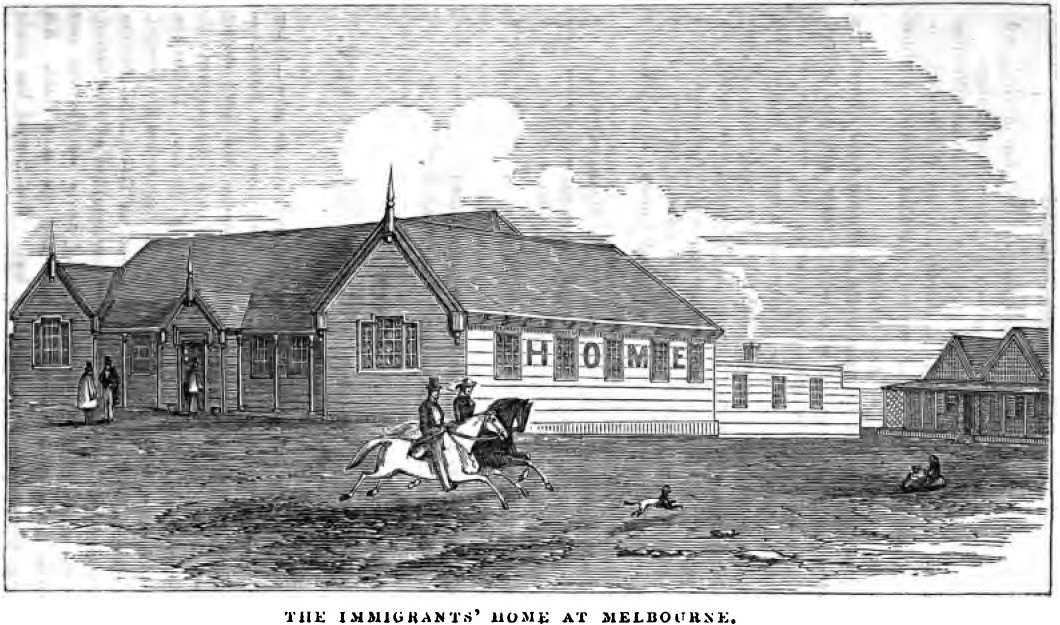
The Immigrants' Home at Melbourne (p.6, XII, January 1855)

Wesleyans were part of the life of Melbourne from the beginning of European settlement. The first Christian worship service in Melbourne was led by Henry Reed, a businessman and Wesleyan lay preacher from Launceston, Tasmania. The first service by an ordained Christian minister in Melbourne was led by Joseph Orton, Wesleyan Superintendent of Tasmania, on 24 April 1836. Joseph Orton had been a strong opponent of slavery in Jamaica, where he was imprisoned for his views. In Tasmania, he was an equally strong critic of mistreatment of aboriginal people.

A small chapel was built in 1838, and then replaced with a larger one in Collins Street, able to seat 600 people, opened in June 1841. The organ imported for that church in 1842 is still in use in the present church.

The present Wesley Church, in Lonsdale Street was built in 1858. Then Superintendent Daniel Draper insisted on a Gothic design, an idea criticised by many Wesleyans as too ornate and too Anglican for a Wesleyan Church. However, Draper's opinion prevailed. The foundation stone was laid on 2 December 1857, and the Church was opened on 26 August 1858. A Manse and Schoolroom were added the next year.

This Church was the central congregation of the Wesleyan Church for Victoria, where the Conferences met, and where ministers were ordained. It was located in a poor part of Melbourne, and pioneered many initiatives in Community Service. In the 1880s, a team of Biblewomen were appointed to work with people experiencing serious poverty. One of these was Mrs Varcoe, who established Livingstone House, a home for homeless boys in Drummond St, Carlton.

In 1869, Wesley Church appointed Moy Ling to begin a Chinese-speaking congregation in Little Bourke Street. He named it the "Gospel Hall".

In 1893, during the acute depression which followed the bank crash of 1891, Alexander Robert Edgar was appointed as minister, with an expectation that he would develop a city mission and be its first Superintendent. So Wesley became the base for the Central Methodist Mission, now called Wesley Mission Victoria, which grew into one of Melbourne's largest non-profit social welfare agencies. Its headquarters on this site adjoin the church. Edgar also began the "Pleasant Sunday Afternoon", where major speakers would speak about important public questions.

In the 1920s the Princess Mary Club, accommodation for single women working in the city was added, and in the 1938, the Nicholas Hall. The S. J. Hoban Memorial Chapel, at the Lonsdale Street entrance, was opened on 4 November 1933. It was the first addition to Wesley Church since its erection in 1857.

C. Irving Benson was Superintendent of the Mission for over 40 years, from 1926 to 1967. Under his leadership, the Pleasant Sunday Afternoon was broadcast on radio, widely across Victoria. The Central Methodist Mission took many new initiatives in that time, and he was knighted for his services to the community. However his conservative political views placed him increasingly at odds with the leadership of the Methodist Church.

His successor was Arthur Preston, Superintendent from 1968 to 1981. Under his leadership the Mission closed many of its institutions and replaced them by personal services. He was also a strong vocal opponent of the war in Vietnam.

In the 1970s, the Gospel Hall Chinese Church outgrew its building in Little Bourke St, and transferred its main service to Wesley Church.

Wesley Church became a Congregation of the Uniting Church in Australia in 1977, as did all Methodist Churches in Australia.

In 2000, both the Congregation and the Mission Board became polarised over proposals to establish a primary care health facility in the grounds, which would have included the option of supervised drug injection. As a result of this very public dispute, the Synod of Victoria separated the Mission from the Congregation in 2001. They now function as two separate bodies.

Since 2001, Wesley Congregation has become very cross-cultural, including members from many Asian cultures. This participation has been encouraged by the previous ministers, Jason Kioa and the late Rev Dr Douglas Miller. Wesley Church's website describes its worship and theological style as "orthodox biblical teaching, classical reformed worship, and a cross-cultural lifestyle".

Between 2016 and 2020 the Wesley Church site underwent a complete transformation, in partnership with developers Charter Hall. The 1920s Princess Mary Club was controversially demolished, and a large office building rose up along the east edge of the site, partly overhanging the retained Manse. The grounds were landscaped and opened up to public use, and all the historic buildings including the church were restored, funded by Charter Hall as part of the deal that will also see a substantial rent paid for the office block on a 125 year lease.

== Architecture ==
The Wesley Church was designed by Joseph Reed, who also designed the Melbourne Town Hall, the Scots' Church and the Independent Church (now St Michael’s) on Collins Street. The church is an early example in Melbourne of a fully-developed Gothic Revival style, executed in rugged bluestone, with a tall octagonal spire, and a smaller spire to the west.

The church is 50.3 metres (165 ft) long from north to south and 23.5 metres (77 ft) across at the transepts. The spire rises to 53.3 metres (175 ft) above ground level.

Wesley's organ was the first pipe organ in Melbourne. It was built in England, and arrived in Melbourne in 1842, being moved to the present church in 1858. It was largely rebuilt in 1957.

Inside the church are two paintings by the noted Australian painter Rupert Bunny (1864–1947): "The Prodigal Son" (Luke 15:11-32) and "Abraham's Sacrifice" (Genesis 22:1-14), which Bunny gave to Wesley Church in 1934.

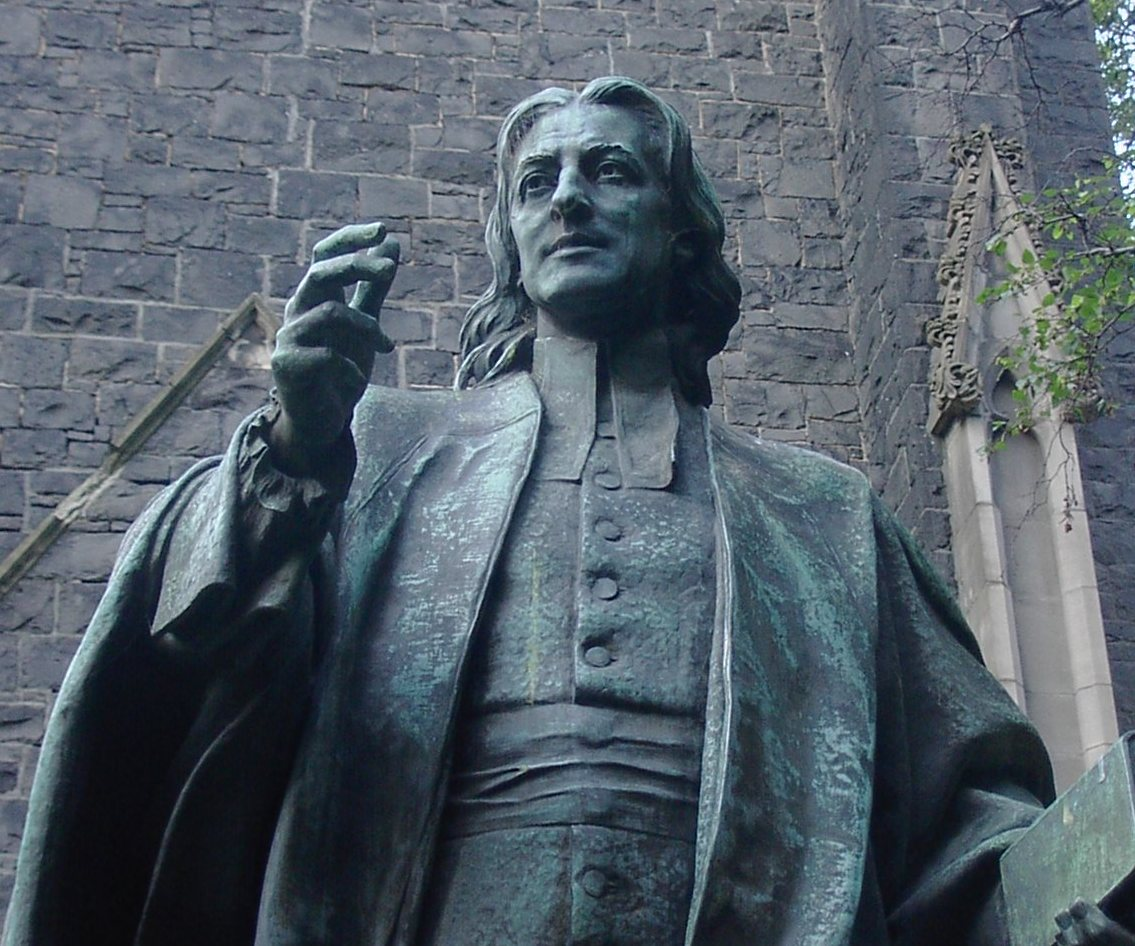
The statue of John Wesley, by Paul Raphael Montford

A bronze statue of Wesley stands in front of the church, sculpted by the British-born sculptor Paul Raphael Montford in 1935.

The site was developed as a complex of related buildings, including a School House to the rear and a Manse/ Parsonage to the east, both also in Gothic bluestone, and designed by Reed. The rear yard contains an olive tree planted in 1875 (this has long been thought to be from a cutting brought to Melbourne from Jerusalem in 1839, but there is no evidence to support this claim). In 1888 grand Gothic style meeting hall was built on Lonsdale Street to the west of the church, but was demolished in 1970 for Wesley House, the administrative centre of Wesley Mission.

A brick Gothic caretakers house was added to the rear in 1914.

The Princess Mary Club was built on Lonsdale Street to the east of the church to provide accommodation for young women starting study or a career in the city, and was opened in 1926, but closed in the 1980s and demolished in 2017.

In 1938, the Nicholas Hall was built behind the 1888 hall; designed by Harry Norris, it has an Art Deco interior and was a gift of the Nicholas family.

In the 2016-20 redevelopment, all the historic buildings including the church were restored, and the site extensively landscaped. The Lonsdale Street cast iron fence was recreated, the Wesley Mission office building demolished in favour of a small park, the Manse and Caretakers house reused as hospitality venues, and the Nicholas Hall refurbished as office space.

== Gallery ==
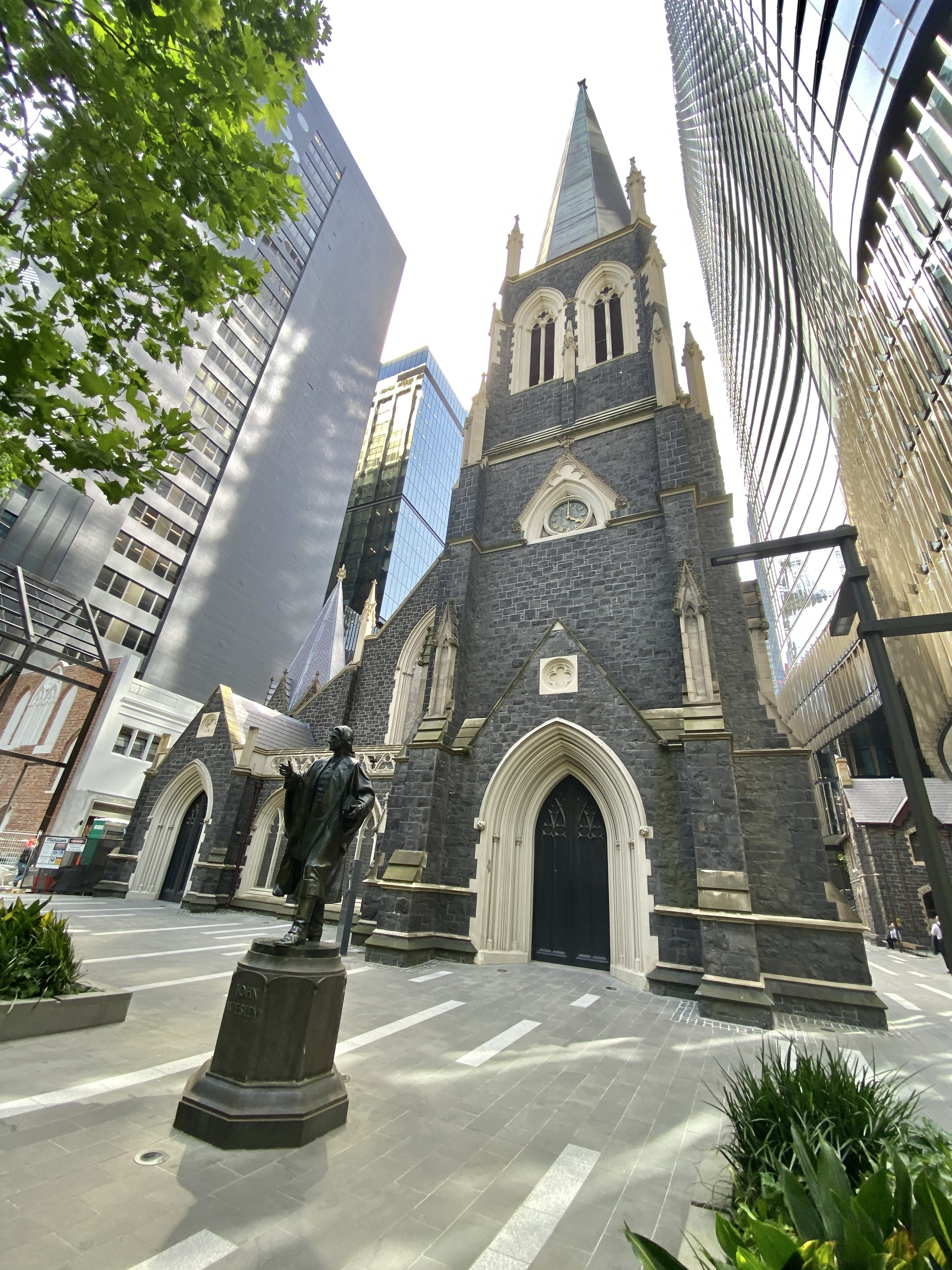
Wesley Church

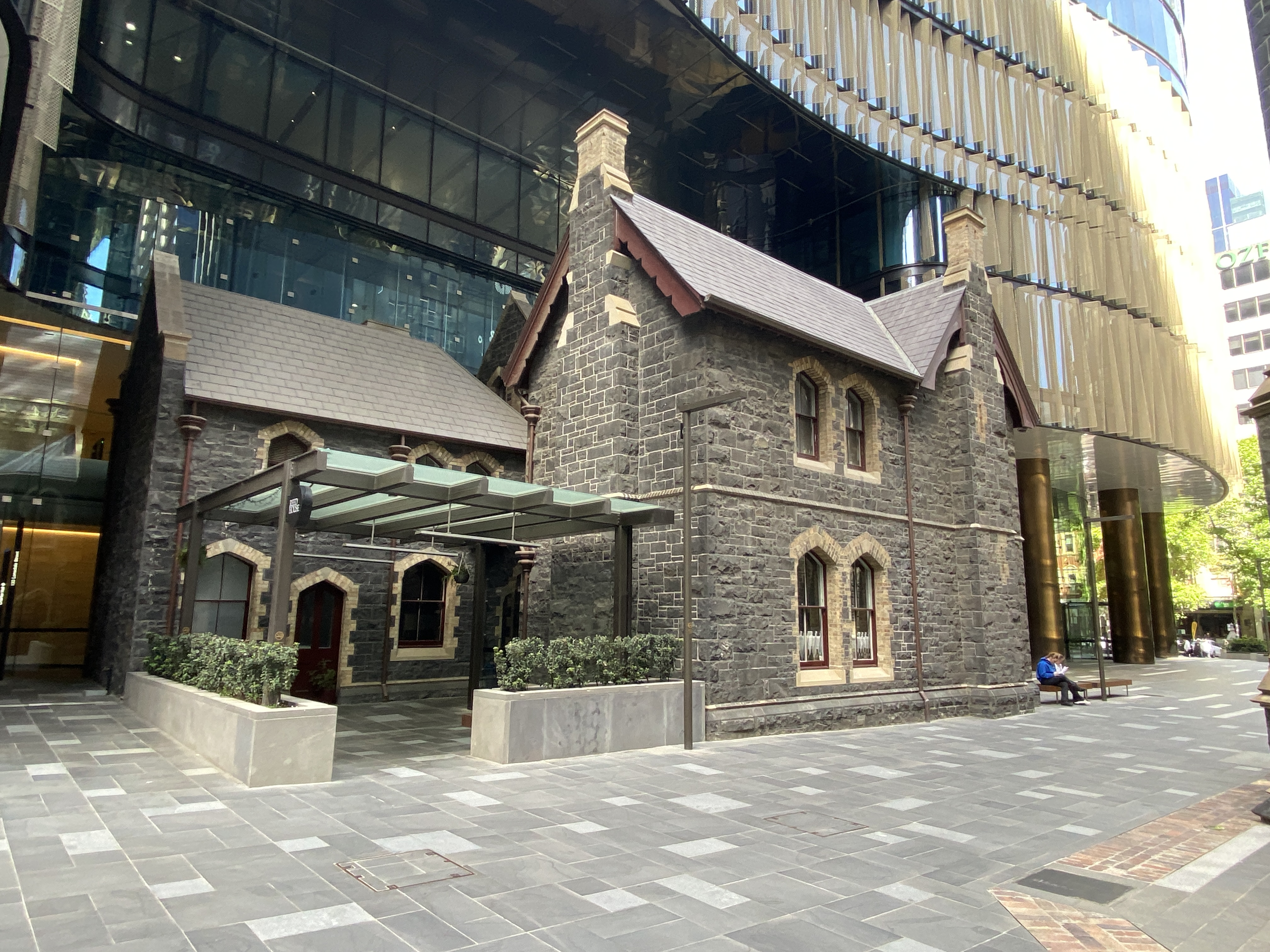
Manse

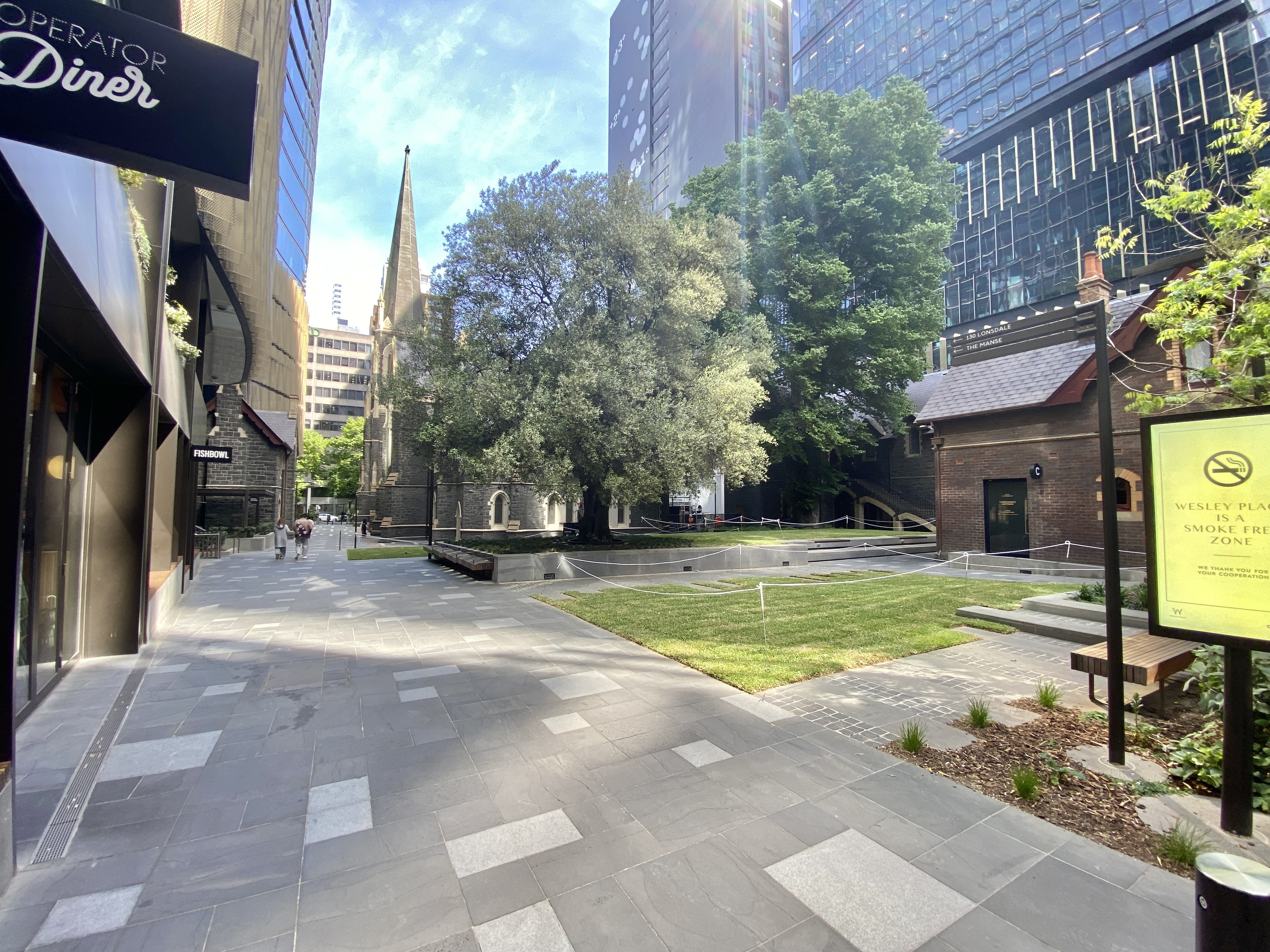
Olive tree

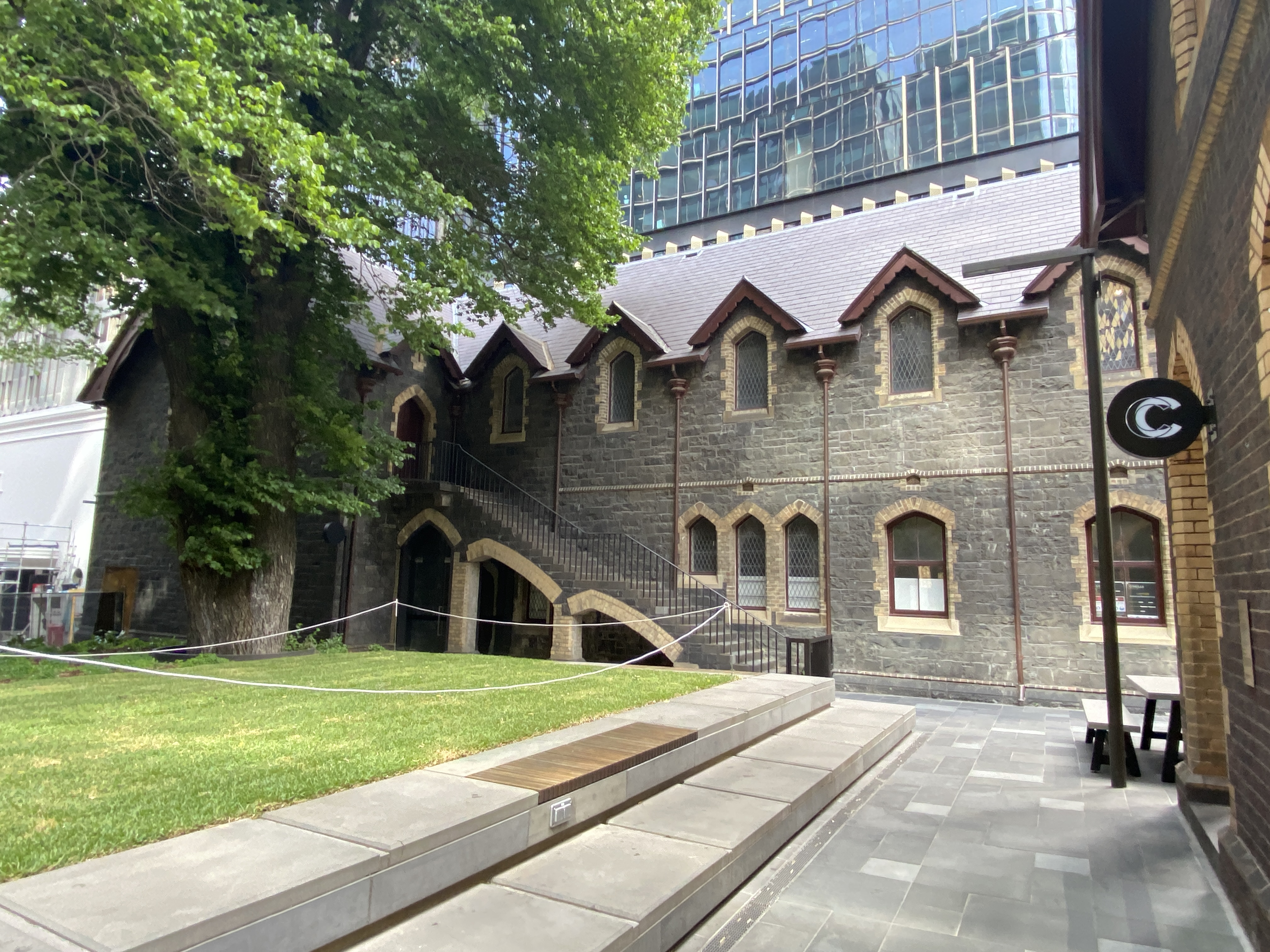
Schoolhouse

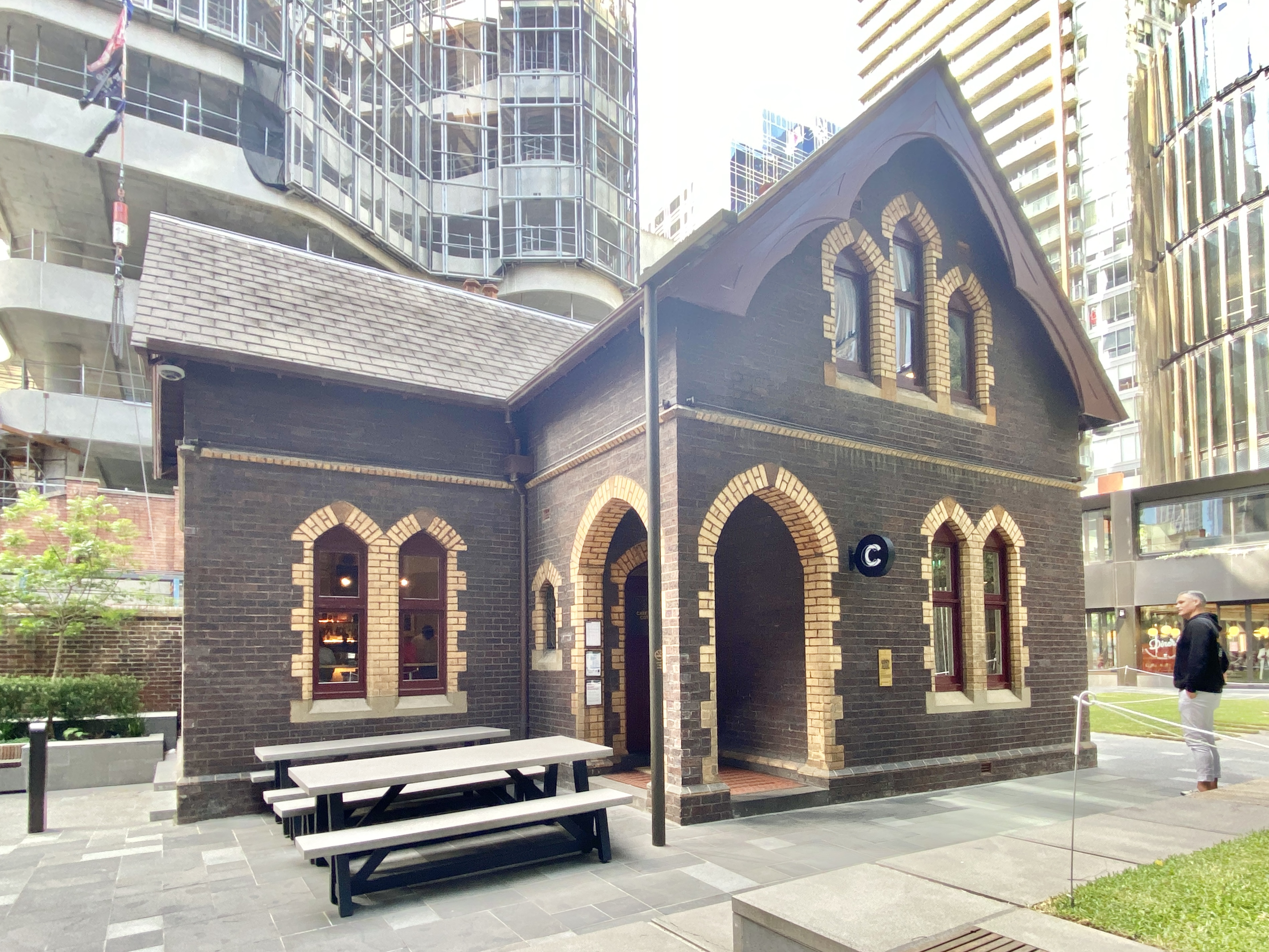
Caretakers house

== See also ==
- Architecture of Melbourne
