= David Lidderdale =

British civil servant (1910–1998)

Sir David William Shuckburgh Lidderdale KCB
- Born: 30 September 1910
- Died: 1 December 1998 (aged 88)
- Education: Winchester College, Hampshire, England
- Occupation: Civil servant
- Military career
- Allegiance: United Kingdom
- Branch: British Army
- Service years: 1939–1945
- Rank: Captain
- Unit: Tower Hamlets Rifles
- Conflicts: World War II: Tunisian campaign; Italian campaign

Sir David William Shuckburgh Lidderdale KCB (30 September 1910 – December 1998) was a British civil servant who served as a clerk in the Parliament of the United Kingdom.

He was educated at Winchester College. Lidderdale first entered the Clerk's Department of Parliament in 1934. In 1939 he was commissioned into the Tower Hamlets Rifles and served with the regiment throughout the Second World War, including in the Tunisian campaign and the Italian campaign. He left the army in 1945 with the rank of captain and returned to work as a parliamentary clerk.

Lidderdale was appointed a Companion of the Order of the Bath in the 1963 Birthday Honours while a Clerk Assistant. Between 1974 and 1976 he served as Clerk of the House of Commons, and he was appointed a Knight Commander of the Order of the Bath in the 1975 New Year Honours.
