= S. J. Hoban =

Australian Methodist preacher

Rev. Samuel John Hoban (1865 – 29 August 1931), best known as S. J. Hoban, was an Australian Methodist preacher, director of the Central Methodist Mission in Sydney, followed by that of Melbourne.

== History ==
Hoban was born in Little Bendigo, Ballarat, one of five children of Pierce Hoban (c. 1835 – 19 January 1865}, and Elizabeth Hoban (c. 1834 – 2 May 1909). His father, a son of Michael and Elizabeth Hoban of Dublin, was a shareholder miner in Band of Hope Quartz Mining Company, and died after a rock fall severely damaged his leg. His widow never remarried; she was forced to raise her children in poverty, but each played their part. Hoban never lost his empathy for the poor, and they loved him back.

He was assigned to Boort in 1887, followed by Dandenong, Poowong, Creswick, Ararat and Benalla In 1897 he was transferred to Geelong West and in 1900 to the Yarra Street church in Geelong. In 1903 he was posted to the Methodist Central Mission in Melbourne, under A. R. Edgar. In 1909 he was assigned for five years to the Methodist Church of Lydiard Street, Ballarat, during which time the church debt was cleared and much accomplished in improvements. Hoban was a fine singer, and a popular addition to the list of entertainers at a fundraiser for the talented young pianist Cecil Fraser at Her Majesty's Theatre, Ballarat on 1 September 1909.

He applied for leave of one year to tour the world, which was granted. His farewell was well attended and after several gracious speeches he was presented with a purse of gold sovereigns, which would have contributed greatly to his expenses. It was revealed that his wife was not able to leave, but he would have a travelling companion in George F. Tippett of the firm of Tippett and Jordan, undertakers. On 29 November 1911 they left aboard RMS Orvieto for England via India, Egypt and Palestine. Tippett, a 54-year-old married man with a 12-year-old son, died suddenly on 16 January 1912 aboard SS Osterley in the Red Sea. (Note: For many years Hoban published an annual tribute to his memory. Tippett's son, (Reuben) Harry Tippett, drowned at Torquay two years later, on 24 January 1914.)

Hoban returned to Sydney in November and was back in Ballarat in time to conduct his church's anniversary service. While away, he became convinced against long sermons, and 20 minutes was ample; also that the Methodist "itinerant" principle, where a minister was not permitted to remain in one charge for more than five years, should not be immutable. He nevertheless agreed to accept a transfer to the Yarra Street Church, Geelong.

In 1915 he left for Sydney, where he worked as superintendent of the Central Methodist Mission, Sydney, for six years, then succeeded Dr. Alexander McCallum, who had replaced A. R. Edgar, as Superintendent of the Wesley Central Mission in Melbourne.

One commentator called him "A gifted preacher limited only by a surprising difficulty in creating new material" Although not a brilliant preacher, Hoban's sound, practical sermons attracted large audiences to Wesley Church, and his management of the Mission's relief work was the model of efficiency — there was no waste or duplication in the sustenance meted out to those who relied on the Central Mission for survival. He had a genial, sympathetic manner, which gained the respect and esteem of all those associated with him.

Mr and Mrs Hoban made a six month visit to America in May 1923. He preached at all the leading Methodist churches in the United States, attracting large congregations. He was offered the ministry in one American city at a salary of £2000 a year, but preferred to return to his duties at the Central Mission, Melbourne.

He initiated the movement for the erection of Princess Mary Club, a hostel for girls adjoining Wesley Church. The building cost nearly £50,000, £45,000 of which Hoban was credited with raising. It comprised about 100 single bedrooms, a large and spacious lounge, apartments for the matron and rooms for the sisters, laundry, kitchen, and roof garden. The charge was 32/6 per week and was open to girls of any or no religious persuasion. It was said to rival similar institutions in any part of the world, and proved a boon to hundreds of girls who would otherwise have been homeless.

At his funeral Rev. C. Irving Benson referred to his late colleague's striking personality, able ministrations and great humanitarianism as exemplified in his work for the Wesley Church Mission, institutions for homeless girls, the aged and infirm; the Methodist Boys' Farm, the unemployed, and other deserving institutions.

== Recognition ==
- The degree of Doctor of Divinity was conferred on him by Victoria University, Toronto, Canada, in 1926.
- The S. J. Hoban Memorial Chapel, at the Lonsdale Street entrance of Wesley Church, Melbourne, was opened on 4 November 1933. One of the windows was donated by his wife and family; another by the family of George Tippett. It was the first addition to Wesley Church since its erection in 1857.

== Family ==
Hoban married (Martha) Annie Young in 1892. She died 22 July 1898. He married again in December 1900, to Mary Louise Elizabeth Holden (1873 – 6 September 1946); (Note: Mary Holden was a daughter of Mary (née Hague) and Thomas Holden, Geelong town councillor, and sister of George Frederick Holden MLA and (Methodist) Rev. Albert Thomas Holden.) they had two sons and two daughters

- Maxwell Hoban ( – ) was a medical doctor with a practice in Beechworth, later in Port Melbourne.
- Evelyn Hoban ( – )
- (Eileen) Ruth Hoban ( – 12 March 1996) was director of social studies at Melbourne University. She wrote ADB biography of Selina Sutherland.
- Howard Hoban ( – ), also a medical doctor, married Doreen Fitz-Gerald on 14 December 1940.

They had a home "Ericstane", 136 Canterbury Road, Canterbury, Victoria
