= Joan Whittington =

English aid worker (1907–1980)

Cicely Joan Whittington CBE (21 January 1907 – 23 March 1980) was an English Red Cross aid worker.

== Work during WWII ==
Whittington joined the Red Cross in 1928. At the start of World War II, aged 32, she became a voluntary nursing assistant and was sent to Cairo, Egypt.

== Post-war achievements ==
After the war, Whittington began to work on expanding the Red Cross' overseas operations, setting up new branches and continuing her work in Kenya, Uganda, Borneo, Fiji, the Caribbean, and the United States. She eventually rose to become the Red Cross' Director of Overseas Branches. Whittington was also a magistrate and Chairman of the Bench in Oxfordshire, and was active in the Scout movement.

Whittington was successively made a Member of the Order of the British Empire (MBE; 1945), Officer of the Order of the British Empire (OBE; 1955) and Commander of the Order of the British Empire (CBE; 1963). She also held the Red Cross' Badge of Honour Class 1, its highest award.

After her retirement, Whittington appeared as a castaway on the BBC Radio programme Desert Island Discs on 31 October 1970.

Whittington died in Henley, Oxfordshire, aged 73. The Jeep she used in World War II is on display at the Imperial War Museum in London.
