= J. H. Cain =

James Henry Cain (28 April 1866 – 30 March 1940), was a Methodist minister in Victoria, Australia, for 25 years superintendent of the Central Methodist Mission in Melbourne.

== History ==
Cain was born in Douglas, Isle of Man. He spend four years studying Law before leaving for Australia in 1883 by the ship Iberia, then two years as a journalist for a major newspaper, a lay preacher in his spare time.

He entered the Church in 1887, his first charge being at Murtoa. Brunswick, Campbellfield, Williamstown, Creswick, Brighton, Mooroopna and Hobart (Tasmania then being part of the Victorian Methodist conference) followed until he was appointed to the Central Methodist Mission in 1908 and in 1923 succeeded Rev. J. S. Hoban as superintendent, from which he retired in 1933, to be succeeded by Rev. C. Irving Benson.

He served as an honorary chaplain to the armed forces in Melbourne during WWI.

He was a Methodist delegate to the Victorian Council of Churches and its president in 1932.

In 1928 he was elected president of the Methodist Church of Victoria and Tasmania.

During the Depression he was appointed to the State Unemployment Council, and contributed weekly articles to the Sun's Saturday Magazine.

He led protests against Hitler, yet a few years later was complimentary about the progress National Socialism was making against unemployment. In that year he also visited the leper colony at Makogai.

He died after a long illness

== Recognition ==
Cain was invested as an Officer of the British Empire (OBE) in 1934.

== Family ==
Cain married Angelina Tryphosa Bracewell (c. 1864 – 23 September 1936). They had two sons:

- Henry Bracewell "Harry" Cain (c. 1894 – 25 March 1948) married Eva Esther Jones on 24 March 1916.
- Douglas Samuel Cain (c. 1901–1957) was seriously injured in a motor car collision with a locomotive. He married Marcia Walton on 11 January 1929.

They had a home (a Methodist manse) at 155 Cotham Road, Kew, Victoria.

Cain may be a common surname of Manxmen: William Cain, MLC and mayor of Melbourne was from that island, but not closely related.
