= Udolphus Aylmer Coates =

British town planner

Udolphus Aylmer Coates OBE FRIBA
- Born: 1908
- Died: 2000 (aged 91–92)
- Education: University of Liverpool

Udolphus Aylmer Coates, OBE FRIBA (1908–2000) was a British town planner.

== Life ==
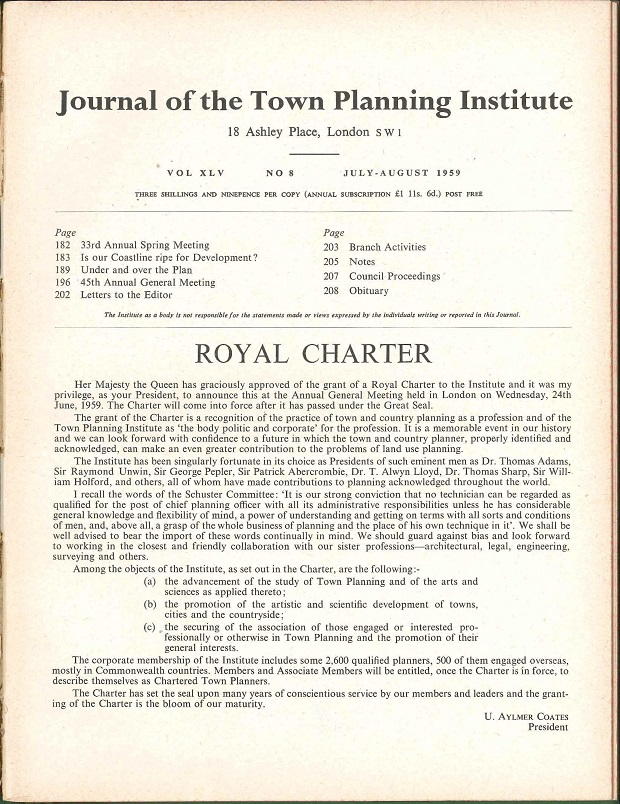
Journal of the Town Planning Institute, 1959

He attended the University of Liverpool. Coates became the first town planning officer for the City of Hull and his new development plan helped the city recover from the blitz. He was also county planning officer for Lancashire. He was President of the Royal Town Planning Institute from 1958-1959. It was during his term that the Royal Town Planning Institute was granted a Royal Charter. He was awarded an OBE in 1963. In 1971, he retired as county planning officer for Lancashire and was succeeded by Jeffrey Rowbotham. Coates died in 2000.
