= Marion Cleland Lochhead =

Writer and historian (b. 1902, d. 1985)

Marion Cleland Lochhead MBE
- Born: 19 April 1902; Wishaw, Lanarkshire
- Died: 19 January 1985 (aged 82); Edinburgh
- Education: University of Glasgow
- Occupations: Writer and Social Historian

Marion Cleland Lochhead MBE (19 April 1902 - 19 January 1985) was a Scottish writer and social historian. Her works span historiography and biography, poetry and fiction, children's writing, journalism, and broadcasting.

== Early life and career ==
Marion Lochhead was born 19 April 1902 in Wishaw, Lanarkshire, the daughter of Helen Watt and Alexander Lochhead, a draper and clothier.

In 1923, she graduated in English Literature and Latin (MA) from the University of Glasgow. Initially, Lochhead worked as a schoolteacher, turning to poetry and writing in the 1920s. Lochhead said 'I began as a poet, with an increasing interest in biography and social and domestic history'.

Her strong Christian beliefs are often reflected in her works.

== Literary associations ==
Lochhead is rarely associated with the Scottish Renaissance, though she was an active member of Edinburgh's literary scene in her younger years.

In 1927, Lochhead co-founded the Scottish PEN (association of Poets, Playwrights, Editors, Essayists and Novelists), along with writers including Hugh MacDiarmid and Helen B. Cruickshank.

== Journalism ==
From the 1930s, Lochhead was a key contributor to the Scottish press, publishing in titles including The Scotsman, Glasgow Herald, Scottish Home and Country, Scottish Field, Weekend Scotsman, Quarterly Review and Blackwood's Magazine.

In her later life, she gave interviews on BBC Radio Scotland.

== Recognition ==
In 1955, Lochhead was made a Fellow of the Royal Society of Literature (RSL).

In 1963, she was awarded an MBE.

== Notable works ==
=== Poetry collections ===
- Poems (1928).
- Painted Things (1929).
- Feast of Candlemas and Other Devotional Poems (1937).
- Fiddler's Bidding (1939).

=== Novels ===
- Anne Dalrymple (1934).
- Cloaked in Scarlet (1935).
- Adrian Was A Priest (1936).
- Island Destiny (1936).
- The Dancing Flower (1938).

=== Historical Texts ===
- The Scots Household in the Eighteenth Century (1948).
- The First Ten Years: Victorian Childhood (1956).
- Young Victorians (1959).
- The Victorian Household (1964).
- Portrait of the Scott Country (1968).
- Episcopal Scotland in the Nineteenth Century (1966).
- The Renaissance of Wonder in Children's Literature (1977).

=== Biographies ===
- John Gibson Lockhart (1954).
- Elizabeth Rigley, Lady Eastlake (1961).

=== Children's Literature ===
- On Tintock Tap (1946).
- The Other Country: Legends and Fairytales of Scotland (1978).
- Scottish Tales of Magic and Mystery (1978).
- The Battle of the Birds: And Other Celtic Tales (1981).
- Magic and Witchcraft of the Borders (1984).
