= Minister for Trade (South Korea) =

The Minister for Trade is a position representing the Trade Headquarters of the Ministry of Trade, Industry and Resources of South Korea, and is appointed as a vice-ministerial level political appointee.

== List of Ministers ==
=== Minister for Trade, Ministry of Foreign Affairs and Trade ===
Term	Name	Took office	Left office
1st	Han Duck-soo	March 8, 1998	February 21, 2001
2nd	Hwang Doo-yun	February 21, 2001	July 28, 2004
3rd	Kim Hyun-jong	July 28, 2004	August 8, 2007
4th	Kim Jong-hoon	August 8, 2007	December 30, 2011
5th	Park Tae-ho	January 2, 2012	March 23, 2013

=== Minister for Trade, Ministry of Trade, Industry and Resources ===
Term	Name	Took office	Left office	Rank
1st	Kim Hyun-jong	July 31, 2017	February 28, 2019	Vice-ministerial level
2nd	Yoo Myung-hee	March 1, 2019	August 5, 2021	Vice-ministerial level
3rd	Yeo Han-koo	August 6, 2021	May 10, 2022	Vice-ministerial level
4th	Ahn Duk-geun	May 10, 2022	January 4, 2024	Vice-ministerial level
5th	Jeong In-kyo	January 10, 2024	June 11, 2025	Vice-ministerial level
16th	Yeo Han-koo	June 11, 2025	October 1, 2025	Vice-ministerial level
