= Japan–South Korea trade dispute =

2019–2023 trade war

2019–2023 Japan–South Korea trade dispute
- Part of Japan–South Korea relations and Japan–Korea disputes
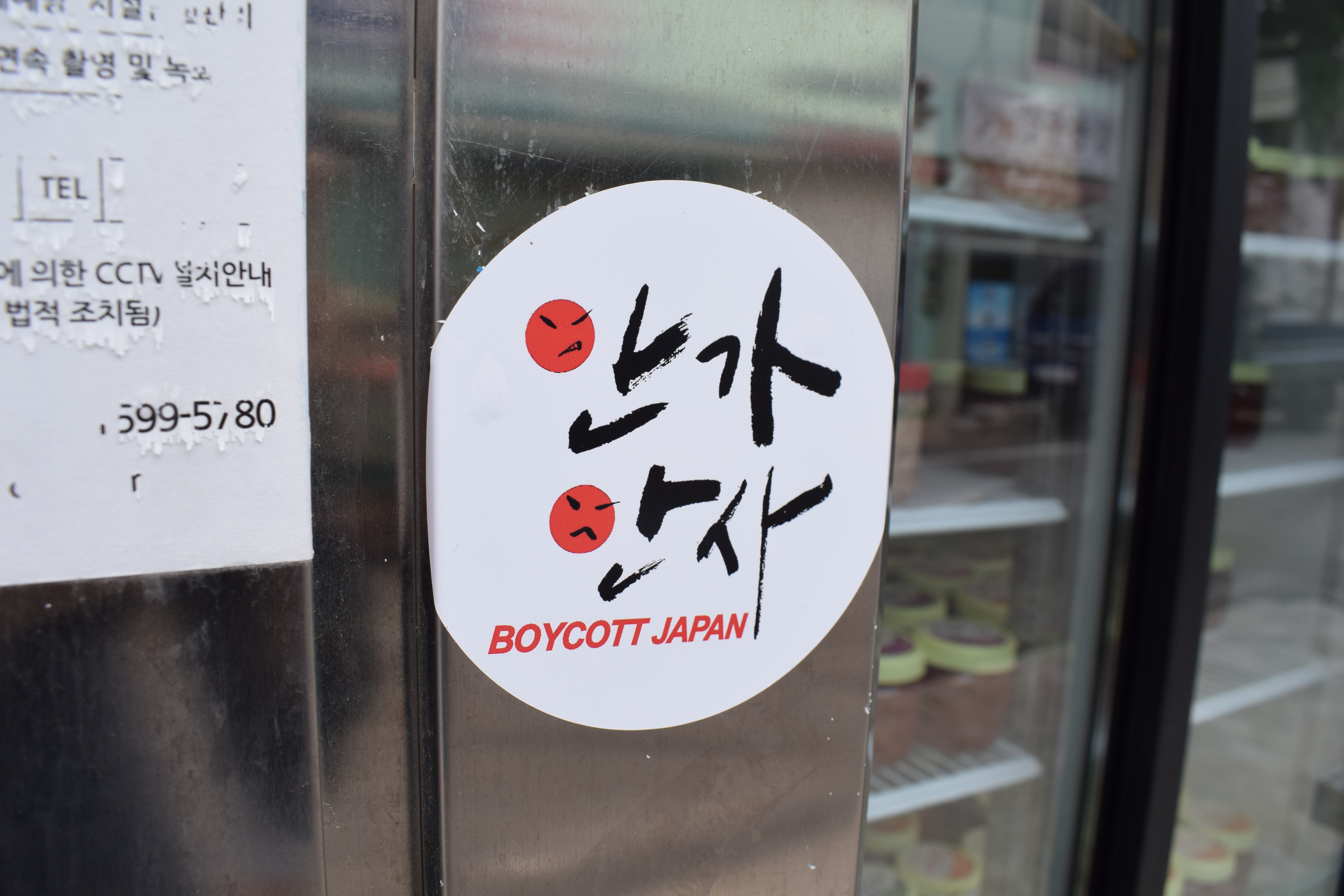
- "Boycott Japan" sticker on shop in Mokpo, South Korea
- Date: July 1, 2019 – March 23, 2023
- Location: Japan and South Korea
- Result: Resolved: Significant deterioration in Japan–South Korea relations in 2019; Japan and South Korea remove each other from the trade "whitelist" in 2019; Japan and South Korea restore relations and add each other back to their trade "whitelist" in 2023

Parties
South Korea	Japan

Japan–South Korea trade dispute, Japan–South Korea economic war (in South Korea), Japanese economic retaliation (in South Korea)

Japanese name
- Kanji: 日韓貿易紛争 or 日韓対立
- Hiragana: にっかんぼうえきふんそう or にっかんたいりつ
Transcriptions
- Romanization: Nikkan bōeki funsō or Nikkan keizai sensō

Korean name
- Hangul: 한일 무역 분쟁 한일 경제 전쟁 일본 경제 보복
- Hanja: 韓日貿易紛爭 韓日經濟戰爭 日本經濟報復
Transcriptions
- Revised Romanization: Hanil muyeok bunjaeng Hanil gyeongje jeonjaeng Ilbon gyeongje bobok

The Japan–South Korea trade dispute, also known as the Japan–South Korea economic war, was an economic conflict between Japan and South Korea.

There are different cited causes behind the conflict. The Japanese government removed South Korea from the "white list" for preferential trading in July 2019, as a response to alleged South Korean violations of United Nations prohibitions against exporting certain materials to North Korea. It later officially argued that the conflict was caused by the South Korean government noncompliance with export controls and regulations to prevent resale of strategic goods, and ignoring the Japanese government's request to hold export control talks for three years. However, the conflict was regarded as retaliation to the Supreme Court of South Korea's decisions regarding compensation by the South Korean government. The South Korean government has also denied any claims of mismanagement by the Japanese government.

Several external observers have stated that the current tensions are a reflection of or are responses to various historical grievances from Japan's occupation of the Korean peninsula and from recent regional flash points, such as relations with North Korea and China.

The trade dispute had caused a significant deterioration in Japan–South Korea relations to the lowest point since the two countries normalized their diplomatic relations in 1965.

== Background ==
Japan and South Korea are some of the world's largest economies, ranking 3rd and 10th, respectively, in terms of GDP at the time. South Korea, the largest memory chip producer in the world, and Japan, the largest supplier of crucial materials in chip production, have so far served as the cradle for technological products such as smartphones and personal computers.

South Korea is home to Samsung Electronics and SK Hynix, companies that together produce two-thirds of the world's memory chips. In Japan, 3 companies (JSR Corporation, Showa Denko, and Shin-Etsu Chemical) as well as Kanto Denka Kogyo, produce 90% of the world's Fluorinated polyimide and Photoresist, both of which are used for LCD and OLED displays, and 70% of Hydrogen Fluoride, used to make LSI, DRAM and NAND flash memory. South Korea imports 94% of Fluorinated polyimide, 92% of Photoresists, and 44% of Hydrogen Fluoride from Japan, according to data from Korea International Trade Association. (Note: According to data from January to May 2019, South Korea imports 93.7% of Fluorinated polyimide, 91.9% of Photoresist and 43.9% of Hydrogen Fluoride from Japan. There was a significant decline in Hydrogen fluoride imports since 2010, at which point South Korea imported 72.2% from Japan. Despite Fluorinated polyimide and Photoresist also having a noticeable decline since 2010 at 97.7% and 95.5%, respectively, the dependency on Japanese industries for these materials are still high, making South Korea still vulnerable to export restrictions from Japan.) On the other hand, Japan had export dependency on South Korea for these three materials at 22.5%, 11.6%, and 85.9%, respectively.

The two countries established diplomatic relations in December 1965, following the signing of the normalization treaty in June of the same year when Japan recognized South Korea as the only legitimate government of the whole Korean Peninsula. As the relations continued to develop over the next few decades, both countries became two of the strongest allies of the United States in Asia, to counter the influence of China, Russia, and North Korea. However, their relations have been negatively impacted by many ongoing disputes, such as the Liancourt Rocks dispute (known as Dokdo in Korean and Takeshima in Japanese) and differing interpretations on Imperial Japan's treatment of the people in then-colonial Korea.

=== South Korean and Japanese membership of "Multilateral Export Control Regime" ===
There are different explanations behind Japanese and South Korean membership in the Multilateral export control regime, a US-led informal import and export control system of strategic goods created in the Cold War between the United States and its allies, of which its aim was originally to prevent the export of weapons or supplies to communist countries and helped to establish "white lists" for preferred trading nations.

At the US's request, South Korea began to establish its export control system signed in September 1987 with the US and a Memorandum of Understanding on Technical Data Protection was concluded. To further integrate itself, laws such as the COCOM (Coordinating Committee for Multilateral Export Controls) were passed, and a system to regulate the import of strategic materials through certificates of acceptance and customs was created in July 1990. In September 2004, South Korea's export and import control system was implemented mainly by the Foreign Trade Act (Article 21), the Enforcement Decree of the same Act (Article 39–45), and the Strategic Commodity Export-Import Notice (public notice by the Ministry of Industry and Resources). In effect, South Korea had signed a treaty with the United States and made laws for it to take domestic effect. It is from this system that a mechanisms such as "white lists" resulted.

However, Hosokawa Masahiko, a professor at Mesei University in Japan, claims that the Japanese Ministry of International Trade and Industry (MITI) made approaches to other member countries and visited South Korea to support their undertaking to implement an export control system in the 1990s, from which South Korea became a member of the multilateral export control regime in 1996 (which later included the trade of missiles in 2001). This relationship caused METI, after Japanese 2001 Central Government Reform, to grant the status of "white country" to give special preferential measures in 2004. He also argues that export controls for national security has been considered as the security exception in Japan and US based on an agreement on "security exceptions" in Article 21, as published by the World Trade Organization (WTO).

=== Comfort women ===
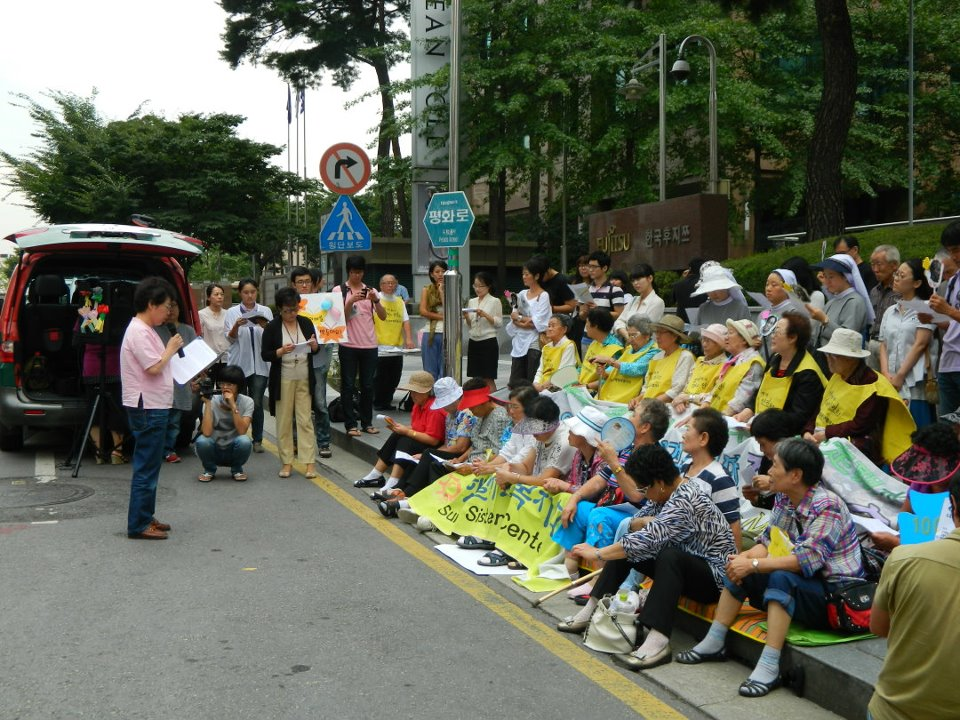
A comfort women rally in front of the Japanese Embassy in Seoul demanding compensation from the Japanese government in August 2011

Although the Japanese Ministry of Economy, Trade and Industry (METI) officially cites "undermined trust in the field of export control" as its reason to remove South Korea from the white list, many external observers argued that current tensions more broadly reflect historical grievances between Japan and South Korea, including comfort women. During Japanese colonial rule in the Korean Peninsula, many Koreans, both North and South, were forced to work at dozens of Japanese companies, often in brutal conditions. During World War II between 1939 and 1945, the Empire of Japan conscripted 5.4 million Koreans, 670,000 of them were sent to mainland Japan as forced labor and as "comfort women", or women and girls forced into sexual slavery in occupied countries and territories before and during World War II, or who participated in the earlier program of voluntary prostitution. After the two countries normalized their relations in 1965, surviving comfort women have demanded for compensation and an apology from the Japanese government, as well as individual claims for compensation. Opponents of the 1965 treaty argue it needs to be revisited because it was signed by then-President Park Chung Hee, who acted against public sentiment.

In 1995, Japan said that compensation for former comfort women was settled in the 1965 agreement, and created the Asian Women's Fund. The fund was set up in 1994 and compensated former comfort women from formerly-occupied nations, including South Korea, through donations by private individuals. This compensation was generally accepted outside of Korea, but in South Korea, many people refused to accept it, saying that it was not money contributed by the Japanese government.

On December 28, 2015, after U.S. President Barack Obama pressured South Korean President Park Geun-hye and Japanese Prime Minister Shinzō Abe, the two countries signed an agreement regarding settling the issue of "comfort women" during World War II, which was deemed final and irreversible if Japan fulfilled its responsibilities. Japan agreed to pay ¥1 billion (₩9.7 billion; $8.3 million) to a fund supporting surviving victims while South Korea agreed to refrain from criticizing Japan regarding the issue.

On May 11, 2017, South Korean President Moon Jae-in announced the agreement would not be enacted in its current stage and that negotiations for a deal between Japan and South Korea over the comfort women dispute had to start over. Part of the justification for this was the lack of consultation from former comfort women and their supporters. Moon put forward a new proposal for a joint compensation fund that both South Korean and Japanese companies would contribute to, but Tokyo has rejected this.

In, January 2018, Moon called the 2015 agreement "undeniable, but called on Japan to accept the truth and make a heartfelt apology to victims." In March 2018, the Japanese government argued that the 2015 Japan–South Korea agreement confirmed that this issue was finally and irreversibly resolved and lodged a strong protest to South Korea through diplomatic channels, stating that "such a statement goes against the agreement and is therefore completely unacceptable and extremely regrettable." In November 2018, Moon Jae-in's administration shut down the Japanese-funded comfort women foundation which was launched in July 2016 to finance the agreement's controversial settlement, calling it a "political agreement that excludes victims and the public" and essentially voiding the 2015 agreement; however, Moon has not formally abandoned the agreement, stating that it was inappropriate to consider the deal "null and void". The decision sparked protest by Shinzō Abe's government, who warned of risking damaging ties between the two countries.

=== Court decisions regarding compensation ===
The two countries' bilateral relations then declined in late 2018, after the Supreme Court of South Korea and other high courts made a decision that ordered several Japanese companies, including Mitsubishi Heavy Industries, Nachi-Fujikoshi and Nippon Steel, to make compensations to the families of South Koreans who were unfairly treated and illegally forced to supply labor for World War II war efforts, such as building ships and aircraft for Japan without pay at a Mitsubishi shipyard and machine tool factory in Nagoya in 1944. The Japanese government protested these decisions, claiming that the issue was settled under the 1965 treaty of Normalization of Diplomatic relations between the two countries and stating that it would be taking "necessary measures" against South Korea.

On October 30, the Supreme Court rejected appeals to overturn a 2013 order requiring Nippon Steel to pay compensation to four South Korean workers who underwent forced labor which occurred during the war and ordered to pay each of the workers an individual sum of 100 million won (US$87,700). A month later, on November 30, 2018, Gwangju High Court rejected an appeal by Mitsubishi Heavy Industries regarding 2013 appeals of court decision that the company must pay 80 million won ($71,000) to compensate each of the 23 plaintiffs and ordered to compensate the remaining 5 South Korean elderly people who forced to work in a Japanese company where the company in a separated ruling by Supreme Court on November 28 ordered to pay 150 million won ($134,000) to each of 28 plaintiffs, elderly people which is still alive or their families. On January 18, 2019, Seoul High Court dismissed Nachi-Fujikoshi appeal of October 2014 Seoul Central District Court decision against an order that it must pay each 17 South Korean women 80 million to 100 million won (US$69,000 to US$89,000) because the victims were "tricked" into forced labor in harsh conditions.

On January 8, 2019, Daegu District Court approved a request by plaintiff to seizure of 81,075 shares held by Nippon Steel in POSCO-Nippon Steel RHF Joint Venture (PNR), a South Korea-based joint venture with POSCO, which is part of 2.34 million shares worth about 11 billion won ($9.78 million) owned by the Japanese steelmaker. These decision was followed in March 2019 by same decision for seizure of Mitsubishi Heavy Industries trademark and patent assets by Daejeon District Court.

On June 19, South Korea proposed to join funds with Japan to give compensation to forced labor victims but Japan rejected the offer. Instead, Japan called for the establishment of an arbitration panel in accordance with the rules of the 1965 Japan-Korea Normalization Agreement. The panel would consist of one member each from third-party countries.

== Chronology ==
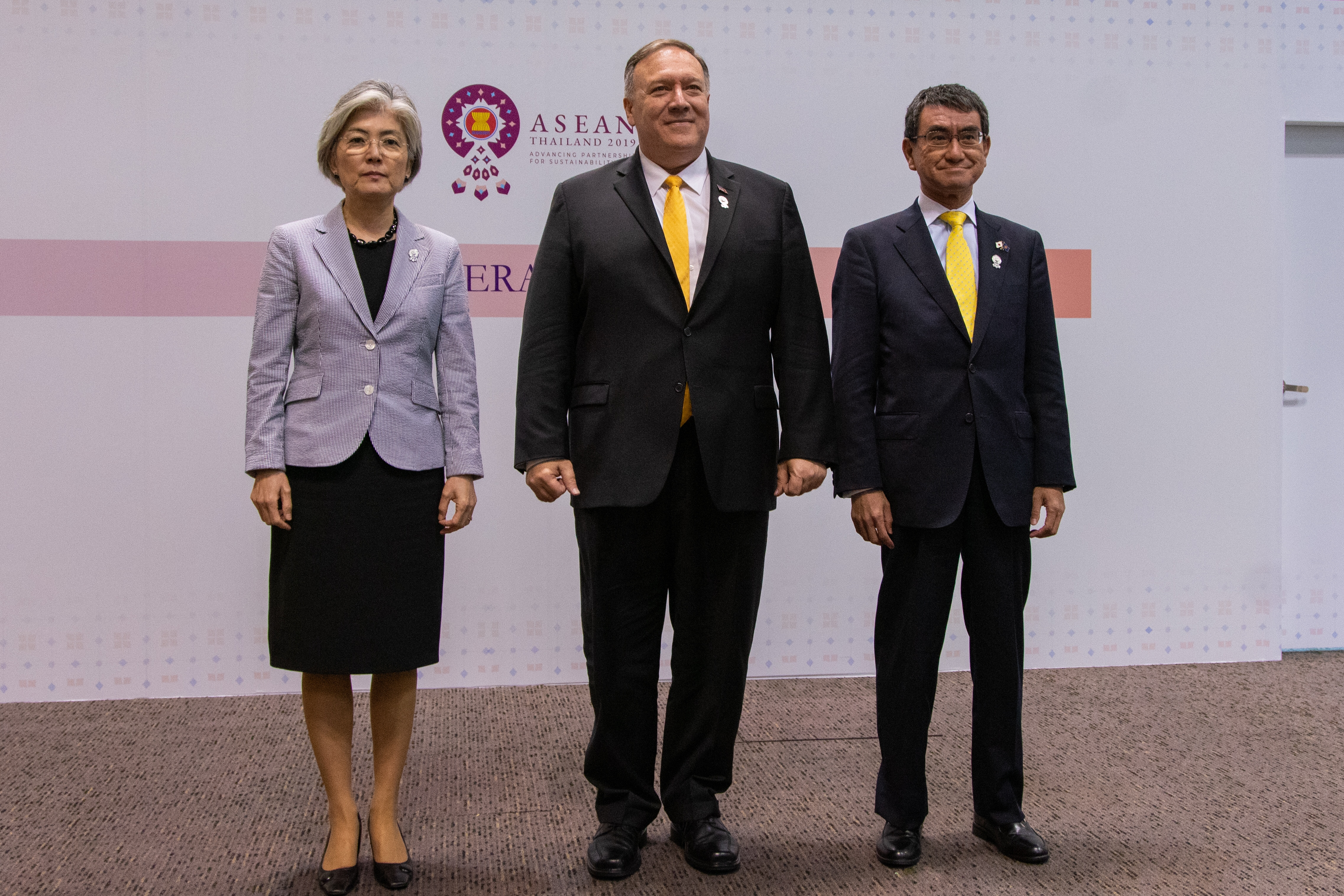
From left to right: Kang Kyung-wha, Mike Pompeo, and Tarō Kōno in Bangkok, at a trilateral meeting in August 2019

=== 2019 ===
==== July 2019 ====
On July 1, Japanese Ministry of Economy, Trade and Industry (METI) applied updated licensing policies and procedures on the export and transfer of controlled items and their relevant technologies to South Korea. These decisions, effective on July 4, put updated licensing policies on the industry, including a licensing process, forcing exporters to seek approval for each shipment up to 90 days. Deputy Chief Cabinet Secretary Yasutoshi Nishimura has said that the curbs were due to security concerns. The South Korean government has replied that the Japanese government is showing "economic retaliation" towards a matter that was decided by Supreme Court of South Korea, whose decisions cannot be altered by the Government of South Korea.

In the press release regarding the export control and regulation, Japanese METI begins the process for removing South Korea from "White Countries", and required exporters in Japan to have individual export licenses for certain items, fluorinated polyimide, resist, and Hydrogen Fluoride, and their relevant technologies. As METI did not give specific examples, some Japanese media doubted that South Korea may have passed on restricted chemicals to the United Arab Emirates, Iran, or North Korea. For example, a Japanese broadcaster Fuji TV and a Japanese newspaper Sankei Shimbun on July 10 reported that over the past four years (from 2015 to March 2019), South Korea found 156 strategic goods with potential weapon being secretly exported. The list included ingredients for the nerve agent VX, used in the assassination of Kim Jong-nam, the half-brother of North Korean leader Kim Jong Un, and hydrofluoric acid that had been smuggled to the United Arab Emirates and elsewhere.

The South Korean government denied Japanese media's allegations. South Korean Trade, Industry and Energy Minister Sung Yun-mo stated that an emergency inspection on companies importing chemicals from Japan came up with no evidence those chemicals were being exported to North Korea, and that Japan's claims were groundless and should be stopped. A Bareunmirae Party lawmaker Ha Tae-kyung made a further claims that Japanese authorities uncovered suspected smuggling of strategic items by Japanese companies to North Korea, citing data from the Center for Information on Security Trade Controls (CISTEC), a nongovernmental organization that tracks data on export controls. Others view Japan's trade restrictions as partially being an excuse to retaliate against suspected intellectual property infringement by South Korean companies.

Then South Korea, on behalf of the Ministry of Foreign Affairs and Ministry of Trade, Industry and Energy announced a plan to withdraw Japan's export restrictions during the meeting of the WTO Council on Trade in Goods in Geneva on July 8 to 9.

Samsung Electronics vice chairman Lee Jae-yong traveled to Japan on July 7 to seek support from Japanese suppliers. He returned from Japan on the 12th and reportedly secured resources needed for its production for long term.

On July 12, representatives from Japan and South Korea held a meeting in Tokyo to discuss the worsening diplomatic relations between the two countries, but failed to resolve the issue. A week later, as the Ministry of Trade, Industry and Energy of South Korea held a press conference on the administrative briefing held on July 12 and following exchanges of e-mails, and the press conference included some misinformation, METI disclosed the facts as press release.

On July 24, the two countries took the issue over high-tech exports to WTO in Geneva, where they sent senior officials. Japan sent the director-general of economic affairs of Foreign Ministry, Shingo Yamagami. South Korea also sent deputy trade minister Kim Seung-ho. On the day, the minister of the Ministry of Trade, Industry and Energy (MOTIE) of South Korea (ROK) made claims about their catch-all control, the policy dialog between Japan and South Korea, the South Korea's export control system, and possible global impact on free trade caused by Japan's update. Responding to this, METI clarified Japan's position on the South Korea's catch-all system which South Korea claims as appropriate for both conventional weapons and weapons of mass destruction, and explained the background to the current lack of bilateral policy dialog.

==== August 2019 ====
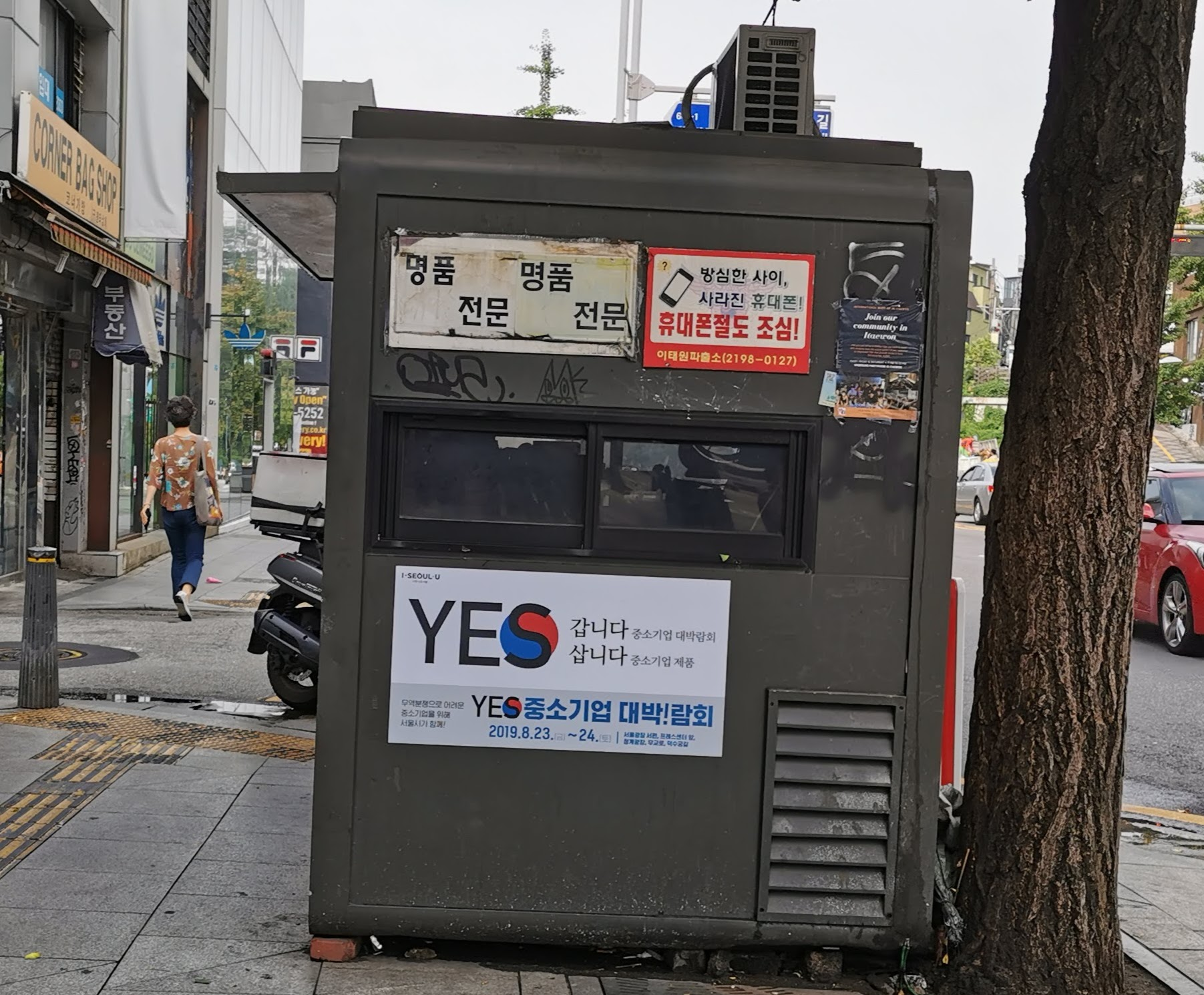
Poster invitation to buy Korean products in Seoul

On August 2, Japanese cabinet approved the removal of South Korea from the "whitelist": the countries that have the most-favored status as trade partners, consisting of 27 countries. The loss of "most-favored trade status" will apply to dozens more products on a list of items that potentially could be converted to weapons. The decision came after public comments from 40,000 people, which to more than 90% are in favor. The Trade Minister Hiroshige Sekō said that the trade measure was not intended to hurt bilateral ties of both countries. Then, the government officially promulgates the revision bill that excluded the country from the list of preferential trade status and published in KANPO, Japan's official gazette on August 7. However, the bill did not stipulate any additional items that Japan will apply restrictions on, aside from the three chip and display materials. Japanese government decision to downgrade and remove South Korea from whitelist takes effect on August 28, 2019, 21 days after promulgation. With the new revision, South Korea falls to Group B under revised Japanese export control system. (Note: From August 2019, the Japanese Ministry of Economy, Trade and Industry renamed the "Preferred Trade Partner List Countries" or "Whitelist Countries" to Group A and nonwhitelist countries divided into Group B, C, and D and recategorized these countries to reflect their actual statuses against the Japanese export control system. Newly-renamed Group A includes 21 European Union member states, Australia and New Zealand, as well as Argentina, Canada and the United States.) That means the Japanese manufacturers must apply for approval for each technology-related contract for 1,120 strategic materials that will be exported to South Korea, rather than the simpler checks granted to preferential trade partners.

South Korean foreign minister Kang Kyung-wha and her then Japanese counterpart Tarō Kōno clashed at the ASEAN Plus Three meeting in Bangkok, with Kang condemning the Japanese export control was "unilateral and arbitrary". But Kōno insist that the export control is fully compatible with WTO rules.

On August 8, the Japanese government, at a news conference held by Seko, approved shipments of a key material used in making chip and displays to South Korea to ease tensions between the two countries. The approval was granted on August 7, and according to South Korean Prime Minister Lee Nak-yeon, there was a material known as EUV photoresists, which is crucial for Samsung's advanced contact chipmaking production. But Japan warned that if these three high-tech materials are found to be improperly used, the country will expand their strict checks of exports, including expanding application examination. The same material were also approved by Japan on August 20.

On August 12, South Korean government is taking measures to remove Japan from the country's own so-called "whitelist", consisted of 29 preferred trade partners as retaliation of Japan's move, which was delayed on August 8. The decision takes effect on September 18 after the government complete its public opinion gathering process through government websites and emails from August 14 to September 3 which 91% of the opinions were in favor of revision. Upon the revision takes effect, Japan's status has changed. Japan falls into the newly established group A-2 under Korea's export control system. As a member of group A-2, Japan will be treated the same as countries in group B with some exceptions.

On August 28 in Japan, partial amendment to the export trade control order was enforced. There was an announcement by the government of South Korea on the day. In response to the announcement, METI provided their notes as press release to deny South Korean views.

On August 29, Japan approved the first export materials since South Korea's removal from the most-favored trade status. There is a shipment of a Hydrogen fluoride, whose the materials exported for the first time since Japan tightened its exports. The main recipient of the material is Samsung Electronics. But Japan refused to confirm the export.

==== September 2019 ====
On September 3, METI submitted opinions and questions regarding the plans of South Korea to revise the public notice of the exportation and importation of strategic items.

South Korean Trade, Industry, and Energy Ministry announce to file a complaint with the WTO over Japanese tighter export controls and restrictions of three materials. The trade minister Yoo Myung-hee, told media on September 11 that she described the restrictions as a "discriminatory act directly targeting South Korea, and it was politically motivated". Japanese Trade Minister Isshu Sugawara agree to hold talks with South Korea under WTO dispute settlement in a press conference on September 20.

On September 26, newly appointed Japanese Foreign Minister Toshimitsu Motegi meet with South Korean Foreign Minister Kang Kyung-wha in New York City. The two countries fail to make a progress to resolve the bilateral issue, says that are "big disagreements" between the two countries, but agree to continue the dialog.

==== October 2019 ====
South Korean Trade, Industry, and Energy Ministry issued a statement on October 1 that the Japanese government has not approved shipment of Hydrogen fluoride to the country even though 90 days have passed since a Japanese exporter submitted an application to export the materials.

On October 11, Japan held consultations under the WTO Agreement in Geneva with the government of South Korea regarding Japan's update of licensing policies and procedures on exports to South Korea. This is part of the WTO Dispute Settlement procedure under which South Korea requested bilateral talks. If it does not resolve the issue on 60 days, South Korea will request the WTO Dispute Settlement Body to establish a panel to rule on the issue.

==== November 2019 ====
On November 19, the second round of bilateral consultation under the WTO Agreement was held. Japan pointed out that the allegation of WTO-inconsistency is completely baseless. And, Japan explained once again that export licenses are granted once items in concern are confirmed to be for civil use and no risk of diversion for military use exists, that Japan's measure is not an export ban, and no impact to supply chains has been found. These talks fail to resolve the trade dispute between two countries.

On November 22, South Korea decided to suspend WTO petition against Japan's export control.

==== December 2019 ====
On December 4, Japanese METI held a Director-General level preparatory meeting for the 7th Japan-Korea Export Control Policy Dialogue with the Korean Ministry of Trade, Industry and Energy (MOTIE). During the preparatory meeting, both sides discussed details of the forthcoming policy dialogue including dates and agendas.

On December 16, Japanese METI held the 7th Japan-Korea Export Control Policy Dialogue with Korean MOTIE. During the Dialogue, experts from the two sides exchanged views on circumstances and challenges regarding critical technology control and their export control systems. Both sides agreed to continue the Dialogue and communications to contribute to resolving issues of concern.

=== 2020 ===
==== January 2020 ====
Moon Jae-in said in new year's address, "In the face of Japan's export restrictions, business, labor, the Government and the people all joined forces to localize production of key materials, components and equipment. The whole nation came together to realize the goal of building a country that cannot be shaken. This task had been left undone for several decades; however, we made significant achievements in just half a year."

==== February 2020 ====
On February 21, Japanese METI held a Director-General level preparatory meeting with Korean MOTIE. As a result of the meeting, both sides agreed to hold the 8th Japan-Korea Export Control Policy Dialogue on March 10.

==== March 2020 ====
On March 6, Japanese METI and Korean MOTIE have agreed to hold the 8th Japan-Korea Export Control Policy Dialogue on March 10 via video conference system. On March 10, Japanese METI and Korean MOTIE held the 8th Japan-Korea Export Control Dialogue. At the Dialogue, both sides updated and exchanged views on improvements in system and implementation of trade and sensitive technology transfers controls, to contribute to exploring resolution of issues of concern.

==== June 2020 ====
On June 19, responding to the resumption of WTO dispute settlement process which was announced by South Korea, Minister of Economy, Trade and Industry Hiroshi Kajiyama mentioned that such a unilateral action is deeply regrettable as it would undermine agreements at the previous Japan-Korea Export Control Policy Dialogues where both sides agreed to explore resolution of issues of concern through dialogues and communications. On June 30, after blocking South Korea's initial request for the establishment of WTO panel, Minister of Economy, Trade and Industry Kajiyama stated that he wants "South Korea to come back to the table and suspend the WTO process so that we [Japan and South Korea] can relaunch the Export Control Policy Dialogues".

==== August 2020 ====
On August 19, Korean MOTIE eliminated antidumping duties on pneumatic valves from Japan. Through its examination at the request of Japan, the WTO Dispute Settlement Body had ruled that the South Korea's imposition of the antidumping duties was inconsistent with the Antidumping Agreement and had recommended the South Korea to make corrections.

==== November 2020 ====
South Korea and Japan had signed the Regional Comprehensive Economic Partnership, a free-trade agreement between 15 countries in the Asia-Pacific region. As a multinational trade deal, the RCEP represents the first free-trade agreement between the two countries, as 83% of tariffs are eliminated.

South Korea made several overtures to Japan following Joe Biden's election in the 2020 US presidential election. On November 9, the head of the South Korean National Intelligence Service traveled to Tokyo as a presidential envoy. In mid-November, a seven-member delegation from the Korea-Japan Parliamentarians' Union headed by Kim Jin-pyo met with Suga and parliamentarian counterparts in Tokyo, and agreed to establish cooperation committees on the Tokyo Olympics, COVID-19 pandemic response, and sports and cultural exchange.

On November 23, 2020, President Moon Jae-in appointed Kang Chang-il as the new ambassador to Japan. The appointment of Kang reflected Moon's willingness to improve bilateral relations following Yoshihide Suga's appointment as Prime Minister. Kang pledged to make every effort to improve and normalize relations between South Korea and Japan. He relayed Moon's statement that the two governments should prepare solutions to the pending problems through dialog and that they should cooperate where possible, including on the Tokyo Olympic Games.

On November 30, WTO largely backed Japan in several claims in a ruling against South Korea's 16-year-old antidumping duties on Japanese stainless steel bars, though some aspects were ruled in favor of South Korea. South Korea stated it would appeal the ruling, however the WTO's appeals body was paralyzed at the time and unable to hear cases.

Following his victory in the 2020 US presidential election, US President-elect Joe Biden pledged to rebuild alliances and partnerships, including the conflict between Japan and South Korea.

==== December 2020 ====
In a phone call following his inauguration in November, Japanese Prime Minister Suga Yoshihide and South Korean President Moon Jae-in agreed to strive to improve bilateral ties in earnest. Secretary-General of the Japan-Korea Parliamentarian's Union Kawamura Takeo visited Seoul in October to discuss possible ways to move forward with South Korean politicians.

Moon Jae-in also expressed an interest in joining the CPTPP (of which Japan is already a member), following South Korea's membership in the RCEP in November. This is the first time Moon has publicly expressed an interest in doing so.

=== 2021 ===
In his New Year's speech, Moon Jae in said he will continue efforts to build a "future-oriented" relationship with Japan. The South Korean government is also set to review whether to join the CPTPP (which includes Japan as one of its members) putting the matter among its 10 strategic goals for international economic policies.

=== 2023 ===
In early March, in an effort to improve ties with Japan, South Korea announced plans to compensate victims of forced labor under Japanese colonial rule by using public donations funded by private sector companies rather than seeking reparations from Japanese companies that were involved with the forced labor. The Japanese and United States government welcomed the development, while the announcement sparked backlash and protests in South Korea. Nevertheless, the new compensation plan warmed relations enough that both countries agreed to resume talks into resolving the trade dispute.

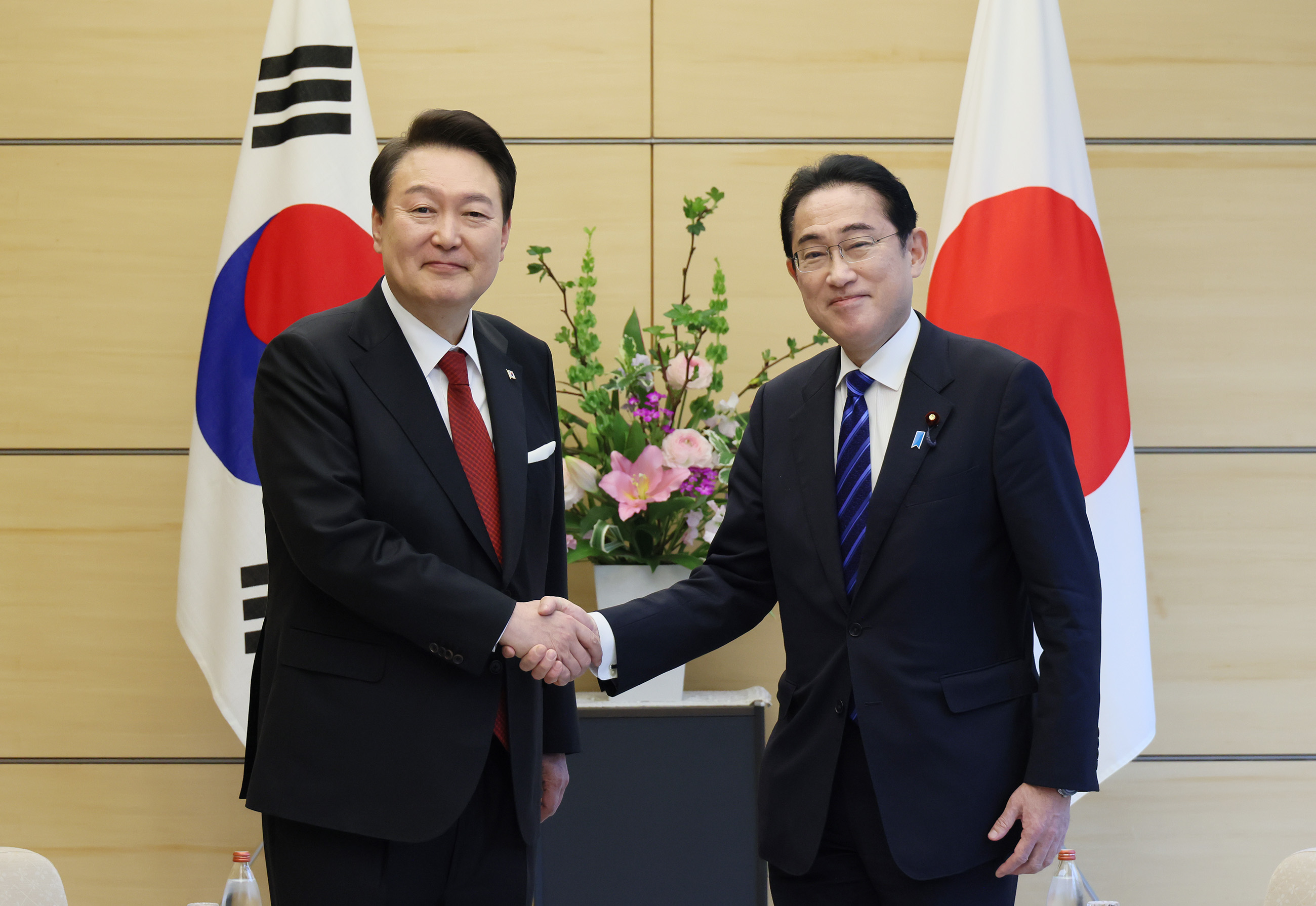
Yoon Suk-yeol and Fumio Kishida in Tokyo, at a summit in March 2023

On March 16, South Korean President Yoon Suk-yeol visited Japan, a first time in 12 years for a South Korean leader, to resolve the trade dispute. Both Yoon Suk-yeol and Japanese Prime Minister Fumio Kishida pledged to resume regular visits and end the trade dispute by restoring each other onto their countries' respective whitelist.

On March 21, South Korea President Yoon Suk-yeol announced he would restore Japan into the country's trade whitelist. South Korea additionally normalized the General Security of Military Information Agreement (GSOMIA) pact with Japan.

On March 23, Japan's Ministry of Economy, Trade and Industry restored South Korea back into the country's trade whitelist. Simultaneously, South Korea withdrew their complaint against Japan from the World Trade Organization; both countries effectively ending their trade dispute. However, Yoon's diplomacy with Japan has faced opposition from South Korean liberals and progressives.

== Reactions ==
=== South Korea ===
==== Government ====
The South Korean government's stance on the dispute is that Japan's export control is groundless and unfair. It argues that it has a sufficient catch-all control system and the lack of communication was on Japan's end. They further stated that Japan's export control is in violation of international law and will be both disruptive and harmful to both countries economies and the global market. The South Korean government urged Japan to withdraw its export control as they claim would damage their relationship further.

===== Before whitelist removal =====
The South Korean government, led by the First Vice Foreign Minister Cho Sei-Young, summoned the Japanese ambassador to lodged the protest against the export curbs by Japan on July 1. The Trade, Industry and Energy Minister Sung Yun-Mo called Japan's move "deeply regrettable".

Then, on July 10, President Moon Jae-in in a meeting with executives from the country's 30 conglomerates, urged Japan to "return to the principle of free trade that Japan has been pushing for" and said he would "take responsive measures" if South Korean companies were harmed by the new restrictions aimed by Japanese government.

===== After whitelist removal =====
In response to Japan's removal of the country from the list, the government held emergency cabinet meeting on the same day as Japan's announcement (August 2) and broadcast live on television across the country. Moon warned Japan against the decisions. He warned that the country will "resolutely take corresponding measures". He also said that "we will never again lose to Japan."

The government announced to tighten its import quota on fishery and agricultural products from Fukushima, which was introduced due to concerns of radioactive contamination.

On August 15, 74th anniversary of Korea's liberation from Japanese rule, President Moon delivered a speech, urged Japan to return to dialogue to ease the tensions. Moon also saying South Korea has "not dwelt on the past" and expressed hope that Japan will play a leading role together in facilitating peace and prosperity in East Asia.

To reduce its reliance on Japanese Industries, the government announced a comprehensive research and development strategy. This includes a plan to spend 7.8 trillion won ($6.48 billion) in research and development for local materials, parts, and equipment over the next seven years. The government also pledged to spend 5 trillion won ($4.12 billion) to increase its own capabilities in the development of key industrial materials. The massive R&D investment will take place starting in 2020 until 2022.

South Korea propose a record budget about 513.5 trillion won ($423.7 billion) for 2020 to boost its slowing economy, represents a 9.3 percent hike from 2019 budget. A key centerpiece of the spending proposals is 24.1 trillion won ($19.9 billion) set aside for research and development (R&D) in 2020, which is up 17.3 percent from 2019, the highest in a decade.

==== Regional governments ====
In response to Japanese trade restrictions to South Korea, regional governments across the country launched a boycott of Japanese products and exchange programs. The action includes the suspension of various activities such as public procurement and leasing of Japanese products, official business trips to Japan and "sisterhood" relationships with Japanese cities.

On September 6, two regional legislative bodies, Seoul Metropolitan Council and Busan Metropolitan Council passed nonbinding ordinance labelling 284 Japanese companies including Mitsubishi Heavy Industries as "war criminal companies" to denounce the alleged use of forced labor by these companies. Under the ordinances, these Japanese companies are to be given the designation, with the mayors and other officials of the cities being requested not to purchase products from the companies in the future. In the case of Busan, there is also a provision that stickers saying "product of a war crime company" be attached to products that have already been purchased.

==== Political parties ====
The Liberty Korea Party, while calling on Japan to remove the export restriction, have also criticized President Moon's handling of the issue. Rep. Na Kyung-won claimed that Moon's administration have exacerbated the issue so much so that it has damaged Korea's relationship with the US to the point where US will not intervene. The LKP called for the government to focus on finding a diplomatic solution with Japan rather than a take hard-line stance.

All political parties in South Korea have voiced the need to restrict Japanese imports. So far, they have announced plans to create a "Pan-national" emergency body in response to the situation. South Korea's major political parties have agreed to establish a bipartisan body on July 31, 2019.

==== Others ====
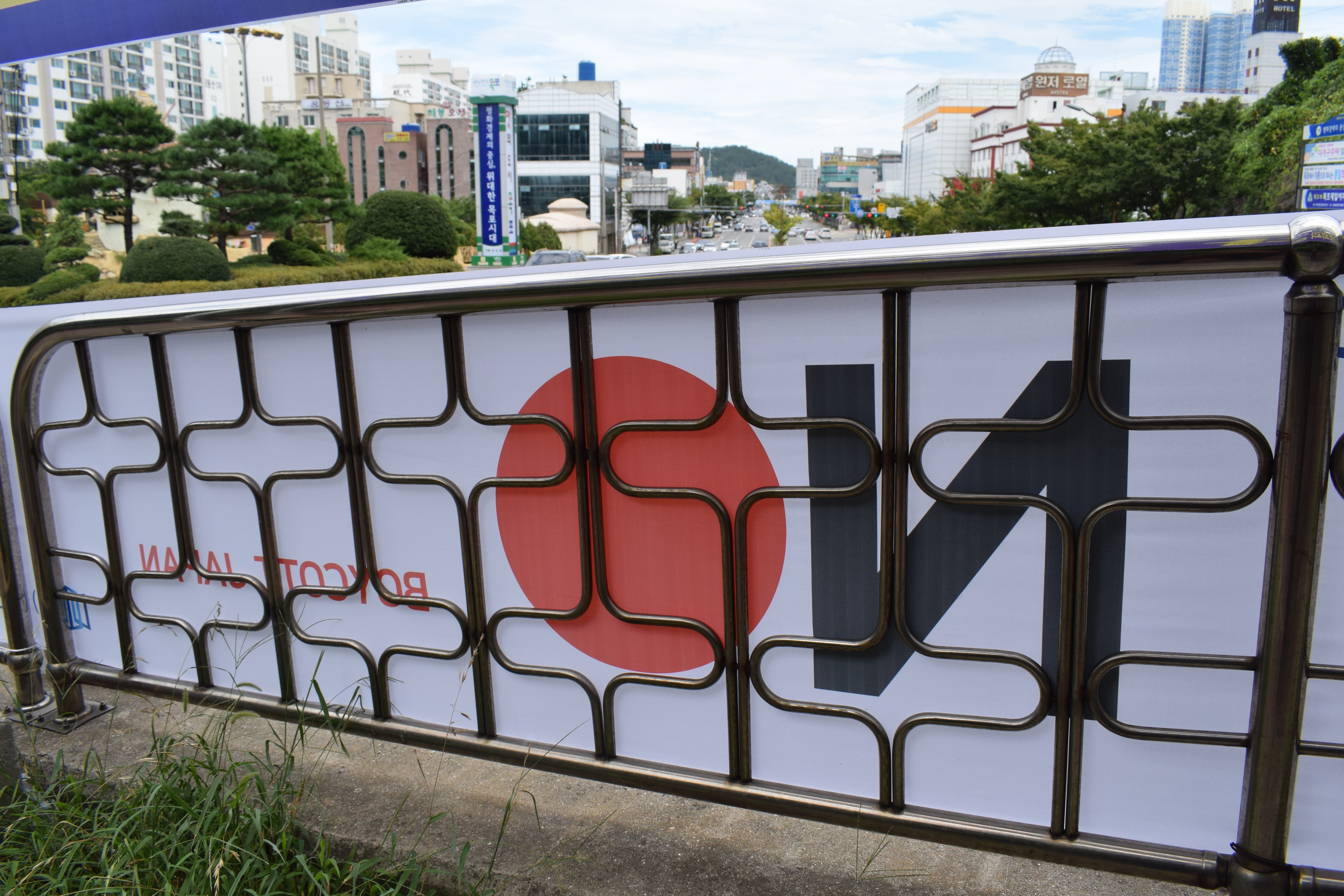
"Boycott Japan" banner in Mokpo

In response to Japan's move, on July 5, a group of a South Koreans took to the street to announce a boycott of Japanese products. Since then, many South Koreans decided to boycott all Japanese products and imports, including food and beverages, cosmetics, vehicles, and clothes. Some also canceled scheduled trips to Japan.

On Blue House presidential petition website in July 2019, nearly 27,000 people signed a petition calling for a boycott of Japanese products and an end to tourism to Japan. According to the petition website, if 200,000 people sign the petition within a month, the government is obligated to respond to the matter officially.

A website called NoNoJapan.com, created by Kim Byung-kyu was launched on July 11 to provide information about Japanese products and services that Koreans boycotted and alternative Korean products to these Japanese one. As more Koreans join the boycott, the website experienced a server crash due to a spike in traffic.

About 5,000 people, including members of 596 civil groups, held a candlelight vigil on July 27, in Gwanghwamun Plaza and in front of the Japanese embassy to criticize Prime Minister Shinzo Abe for imposing trade restrictions. They also held another candlelight vigil in front of the Japanese Embassy in Seoul, on August 3, with more than 15,000 people according to organizer, participating in the rally. A similar protest was held on August 10, now with a declaration was signed by 1,000 students. The protesters also demand South Korea's removal from GSOMIA, which is a military information-sharing pact with Japan. The number of participants was similar to second rally.

They also held large scale candlelight vigil rally at Gwanghwamun Plaza, Chosun Ilbo headquarters, and the Japanese Embassy on August 15, which is the 74th anniversary of the liberation of Korea from Japanese colonial rule. They estimate that 30,000 to 100,000 people participate in the rally. In contrast, conservative groups also held simultaneous rally, called for pushback of anti-Japanese sentiment.

There are two people that set himself in fire to protest Japanese government decision, which held in front of the Japanese Embassy in Seoul. The first incidents was occurred on July 19, at 3:24 am local time, which a men died after the incident, and second incident occurred on August 1 by a 72-year-old man, which is in critical condition.

The boycott of Japanese products spread into the cultural sector, with release of latest Doraemon film series Doraemon: Nobita's Chronicle of the Moon Exploration, which is originally scheduled on August 14, had been postponed indefinitely even after the film's Korean dubbing was finished. In July, further Japanese animation films, Butt Detective the Movie and Detective Conan: The Fist of Blue Sapphire, were subjected to unfavorable online reviews on internet and sold only 134,000 and 200,000 tickets respectively.

A poll conducted by Realmeter involving 504 adults reveal that, as of July 24, 62.8% of respondents say they are boycotting Japanese goods. Another poll conducted by Gallup Korea involving 1,005 adults found that only 12% held favorable views on Japan, while 77% have negative views. Likewise the poll found that 61% of respondents blame the Japanese government for the conflict, while 17% hold the South Korean government responsible.

There were calls by many South Korean lawmakers to restraint or stopping their Investment in Japanese companies involved in their war crime against the many Korean slave labor. Korea Investing Corporation and National Pension Service faced pressure to do so. The pension fund then started to reviewing 1.23 trillion won ($1.1 billion) worth of investment of Japanese companies whether the companies, as many as 75 companies should be dropped if proved to companies that linked to Japanese war efforts in World War II.

Some South Korean media have expressed concerns about the trade dispute; such as the large dependency on Japanese materials, the dispute prolonging, doubts about US intervention, and the government having few options to tackle the dispute. The Korea Times editorial have criticized the Blue House's response to the issue.

=== Japan ===
==== Government ====
The Japanese government's stance is based on global export control regime to prevent resale of strategic goods, and it is a case of updating implementation due to significantly undermined trust with South Korea.

They argue that, while South Korea's catch-all control covers WMD-related goods, it has never clarified whether it covers conventional weapons as well. The Japanese government also claimed that South Korea has repeatedly postponed policy dialogs between the two nations. Japan also maintains that South Korea will simply be treated as a normal trade partner in same other Asian countries and will not get incentive measures as a "white country", the change does not break international law and that it is not an embargo.

In response to South Korea's move to remove Japan from the list of most favored trade partners, the Trade Minister Hiroshige Seko said on Twitter on August 13 that South Korea failed to show how Japan had purportedly fallen short of international export control measures. He also said Japan does not understand why it has been removed from neighboring country's list of trusted trade partners.

==== Others ====
Soon after the METI's press release, a professor who had been in charge of export control at MITI started to provide corrections and commentaries on this issue in media, as there had been many misunderstandings in media provided by nonexpert editors and commentators.

The Japanese government's decision to update implementation of export control prompted criticism from many people, a group of 75 people including writer Satoshi Kamata, economic analyst Katsuto Uchihashi and Akira Kawasaki, signed an online petition that called both countries to hold a dialog to resolve the conflict.

According to a survey conducted by Asahi Shimbun on July 15, 56 percent of respondents support the government's export control while 21 percent did not. Among those who support Prime Minister Shinzō Abe, 74 percent of respondents support it. Among those who disapprove of Shinzō Abe, 43% say they support the export control while 36% say they're against it.

Despite the majority of Japanese supporting the government's actions, on August 4 there was a group of 200 Japanese and Korean demonstrators who protested Abe's government in the streets of Shinjuku. They called Abe to stop the export curbs to South Korea. The amount of protesters increased on August 8. There were calls by the protestors for Abe to resign as the Prime Minister. The organizer of the protests enlisted new participants through many social media platforms.

In the midst of the trade dispute between the two countries, Japanese author Hirokazu Kore-eda urged Japanese and Korean artists to show support for one another to overcome their countries' political situation.

In July 2020, after the resumption of WTO dispute settlement process which was announced by South Korea, former diplomat Kunihiko Miyake provided diplomatic commentary on this dispute started in July 2019, summarizing that the disputes were tragedies aggravated by optimistic trade officials in Tokyo who did not anticipate that the rest of the world would misunderstand and consider the measures another example of a nation using trade measures to coerce other nations over unrelated issues.

=== Other countries and viewpoints ===
Many countries showed concern to the actions of the two countries hurting the global tech industry. Tech companies in the United States issued a letter to both countries urging the two nations to negotiate a resolution to the dispute.

Five of America's largest tech industry groups including the Semiconductor Industry Association, which Qualcomm and Intel Corporation as members, among its other companies, issued a joint letter to Japanese Economy Minister Hiroshige Sekō and South Korean Minister of Trade Yoo Myung-hee. They asked both sides to refrain from escalating their conflict.

Chinese Foreign Minister Wang Yi urged Japan and South Korea to show goodwill and resolve their trade spat through negotiations and dialog.

The German newspaper Süddeutsche Zeitung published an article criticizing the Japanese government for the trade dispute. SZ criticized the Japanese government's historical revisionism as the cause of the dispute between South Korea and Japan, pointing out that trade sanctions against South Korea are unfair.

U.S. President Donald Trump voiced concern about the worsening ties between Japan and South Korea. He said on August 9 that trade and history dispute put the country (United States) in a "very difficult position". He urged the two countries to "get along".

Some observers have pointed out that the dispute may have been exacerbated by both of the countries' leaders to drum up political support. During the beginning of the trade dispute Prime Minister Shinzō Abe's ruling Liberal Democratic Party were gearing up for Upper House election on July 21. At the same time, President Moon Jae-in faced criticism for his economic policy and lack of progress in relationship with North Korea. Observers noted that both leaders are unlikely to back down from the dispute due to political pressure.

Many analysts and experts have viewpoints about the trade dispute as well. Political analyst Paul Triolo, who also practice head of geo-technology at Eurasia Group, told CNBC that since Japan and South Korea are U.S. allies, the United States will likely be involved in mediating the two countries in addition to China because from U.S. perspective, this is a "lose–lose confrontation", which could also inadvertently benefit China. On the other hand, Waqas Adenwala, Asia analyst at the Economist Intelligence Unit said it may be "awkward" for China to mediate in this dispute, as both South Korea and China were victims of Japan's invasion and brutal killings during World War II.

Other analyst and experts, such as Kim Hyun-Chul, an expert on Japanese enterprise at Seoul National University, told ABC News unlike trade of finished goods, high-tech industry goods that are sourced globally are interdependent. Countries that rely on South Korea's semiconductors such as the United States, China and even Japan will all be adversely affected, causing a domino effect on the global supply chain in computer and smartphone industries. Meanwhile, Rajiv Biswas, Asia-Pacific chief economist at IHS Markit, said U.S. electronics companies, many of which have large production hubs in both the U.S. and China, are vulnerable to supply shortages of South Korean memory chips, given the importance of South Korea as a supplier of chips not only hardware such as mobile phones and electronic products but also data processing programs.

=== Business leaders ===
On the annual conference of the Korea-Japan Economic Association in Seoul, 300 business leaders from the two countries have urged both governments to find a diplomatic solution for the trade disputes.

=== International organization ===
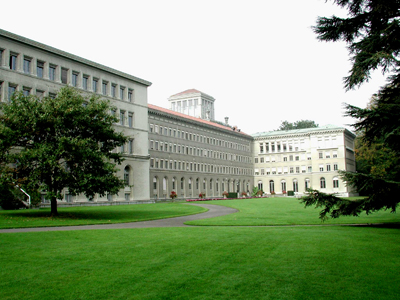
The WTO headquarters in Geneva, Switzerland, where South Korea filed a complaint

On July 14, 2019, at the request of South Korea, the World Trade Organization (WTO) agreed to formally discuss at its General Council meeting about Japan's semiconductors export curbs to South Korea. On July 24, South Korea's delegation brought the dispute to the General Council meeting, and Japanese delegation told that the South Korea's complaints are not acceptable, and other WTO members preferred not to get involved in the dispute.

In June 2020, the U.S. backed Japan's invocation of the WTO national security exception in a dispute with South Korea over semiconductor materials.

=== Efforts to resolve the dispute ===
==== China–Japan–South Korea meeting in Beijing ====
On August 21, the two countries involved in the trade war, and China, involved in a different trade war with the United States, held a trilateral meeting in Beijing. In that meeting, Japan and South Korea agreed to discuss efforts to resolve the conflict over compensating Korean forced laborers that has escalated into a trade war. The then Foreign Minister, now Minister of Defense, Tarō Kōno said that the two countries shared the view on the need to resolve the dispute. But South Korea's Foreign Minister said that South Korea hopes that the country will stick to "free and fair" trade for prosperity in the region.

==== Prime Ministers and presidents meeting ====
Aside from bilateral negotiations in WTO, the two countries hold a bilateral talks to resolve the problem. The first was on October 24, when the Prime Minister Lee Nak-yeon met with his counterpart Shinzō Abe in Tokyo. The second was on November 4 in ASEAN summit in Bangkok where Moon Jae-in held an 11-minute conversation with the Japanese Prime Minister. Photos of the meeting were taken by Chung Eui-yong, director of the South Korean National Security office, and published without the approval of the Japanese side.

== Effects ==
=== Financial markets ===
The Japanese government decision to revoke preferred trade partner status for South Korea rattle global stock markets, aside from Trump tweet about tariffs on Chinese products, especially in Japan and South Korea.

On August 2, days which occur the removal of South Korea from the list, Nikkei 225, Japanese main stock indices, fell 2.11% and South Korea's KOSPI down 0.95%, a 7-month low. Two index then down sharply on August 5, with Nikkei 225 down 1.74% to 20,720 and Kospi down 2.56% to close at lowest level since 2016 at 1,946.98. KOSDAQ, which consisted tech-heavy and small and middle-cap stocks, plunged more than 7 percent to trigger trading halt. For the first time this occurred since June 24, 2016.

In the currency markets, South Korean won fell 9.50 won against US Dollar to closed at 1,198.00, lowest level since January 9, 2017. Then the currency plunged to more than 3-year low against the Dollar at 1,215.35 won on August 5, lowest level since June 24, 2016, and sharpest daily loss since August 2016.

Meanwhile, many global financial markets plunge amid the decision and many stock markets take the selloff, with Nasdaq fell 1.32%, Dow Jones fell 0.37%, and S&P 500 down 0.73%. Also in other stock markets, for example, FTSE 100, DAX, and CAC 40 plunged 2.34%, 3.11%, and 3.57% respectively. On August 5, the index took the one of largest daily loss in 2019, with Dow Jones down 767 points (2.98%), S&P 500 down nearly 3% and Nasdaq down 3.5%. Dow Jones in particular, down as much as 961.63 points.

=== Economy ===
The trade dispute (along with the China–United States trade war) is predicted to have a negative impact on both Japan and South Korea's economy. Japan's growth percentage was lowered for the second quarter of 2019 and the trade dispute with South Korea is expected to exacerbate the slowdown. Several financial services companies have lowered their forecast on South Korea's 2019 economic growth to around two percent or lower. The Bank of Korea has lowered South Korea's economic growth from 2.5% to 2.2%. In response to the economic forecast, they have also lowered interest rate from 1.75% to 1.5% on July 18, 2019. It further cut its rates to 1.25% on October 15.

Moody's Investors Service, in a "Global Macro Outlook 2019–20" report released on August 26, revised down forecast economic growth for both South Korea and Japan. For South Korea, the global ratings agency lowered economic growth forecast from 2.1% to 2.0% in 2019 and 2.1% in 2020 to reflect the fallout from trade dispute with Japan. the agency said the trade dispute "undermines Korea's near-term growth prospects". For Japan, the agency revised down economic growth forecast to 0.7% in 2019 and 0.4% in 2020. Moody's cites that Korea's boycott movement against Japanese goods and services may dent sales. But it saw trade in intermediate goods – including those covered by the export curbs and also more correlated to the global economic downturn – as "posing a larger threat to the Japanese economy."

Amid the trade dispute with Japan, South Korean consumer sentiment fall to 31-month low in August. According to data from Bank of Korea, the composite consumer sentiment index down 3.4 points to 92.5 from 95.9 in July. It is the lowest level since January 2017, a month after then-president Park Geun-hye was impeached. The July consumer sentiment index also down to 95.9, 1.6 points lower than in June, where it stood at 97.5.

The World Trade Organization (WTO) in October 2019, cuts the forecast of volume of merchandise trade growth to 1.2% in 2019 and 2.7% in 2020, down from previous forecasted of 2.6% and 3% respectively. WTO cites this trade dispute, along with the China–U.S trade war, Brexit, and others, pose "the biggest downside risk to the forecast".

The International Monetary Fund (IMF) downgraded the economic forecast for many Asian economies because deterioration of relationship between South Korea and Japan. Asian economy could grow 5% in 2019 and 5.1% in 2020. South Korean economic growth could fall to 2% in 2019 and 2.2% in 2020.

=== Boycott on Japan ===
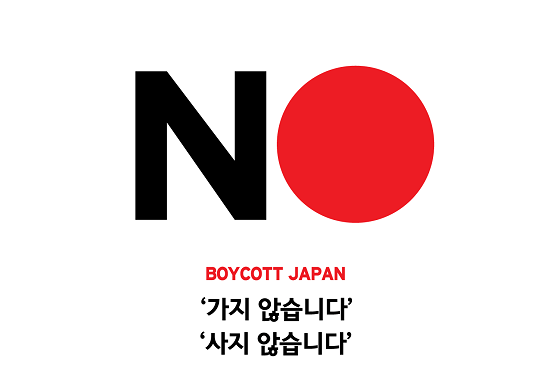
Logo of "NO, BOYCOTT JAPAN", which calls on South Korean citizens to boycott Japanese goods and services. The red circle represents the flag of Japan, commonly known as the Hinomaru. The phrase translates to "Will not go, will not buy!".

In South Korea, boycott movement on Japanese products and services was agitated and affected Japanese brands and tourism to Japan.

==== Japanese brands ====
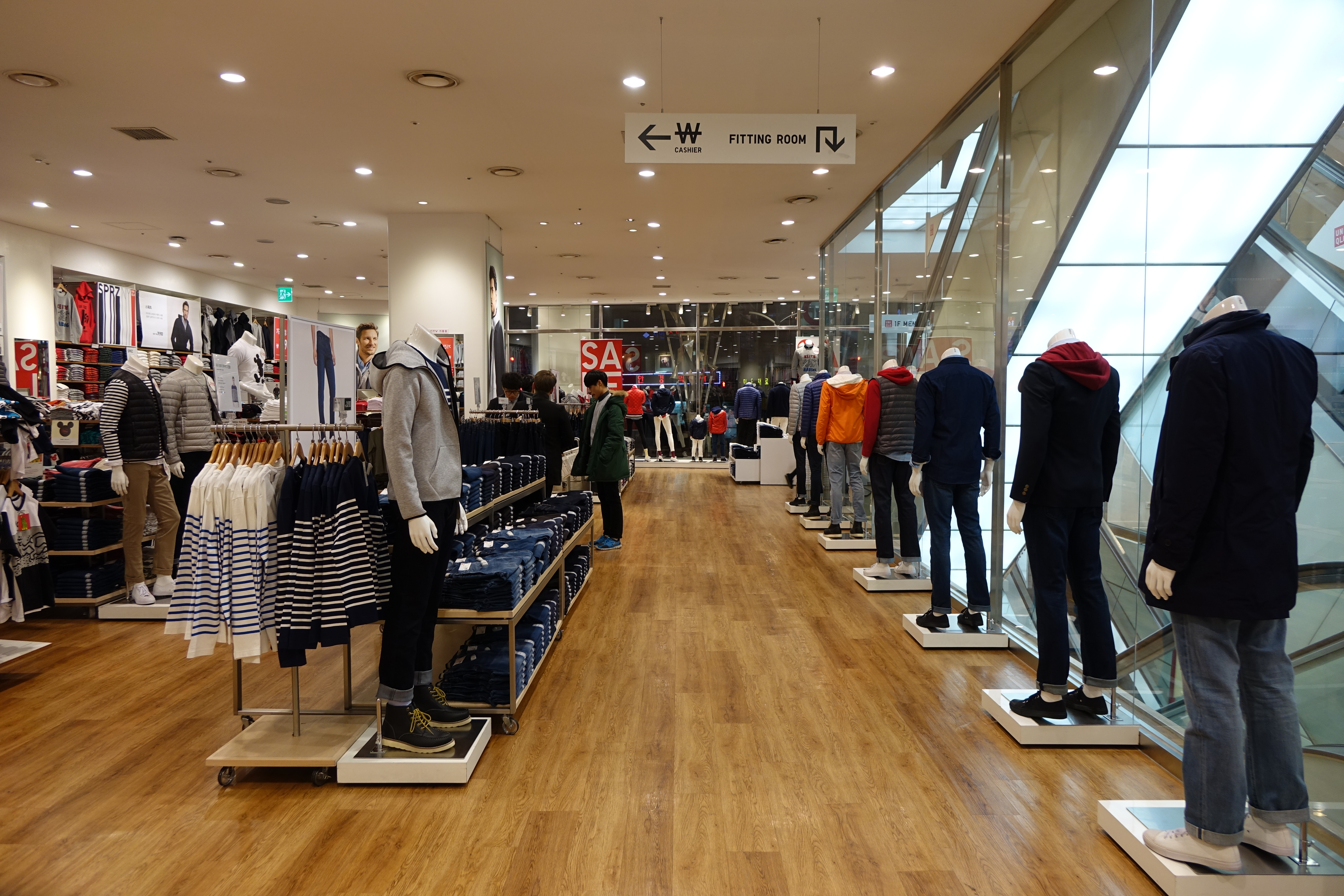
A Uniqlo store in South Korea, 2015. Uniqlo is one of many Japanese brands affected by the South Korean boycott.

On July 29, 2019, a Korean credit card company reported that credit card sales from Muji fell by 33.4%, ABC Mart sales fell by 11.4% and DHC Corporation fell by 55.3%. Similarly, credit card spending from South Koreans in Japan have also declined.

One of the companies hardest-hit by boycott was Fast Retailing, the company that own Uniqlo. Uniqlo sales dropped by 40% and the company announced it close its Jongno 3-ga store in central Seoul. Analysts such as Peter Boardman warns that despite Fast Retailing post record profits, but the company could see many uncertainty because sales in South Korea account for 8% of Uniqlo sales worldwide.

Many Japanese automakers suffering steep fall in July and August. On September 4, according to data from Korea Automobile Importers & Distributors Association (KAIDA), the combined sales of Japanese cars stood at 1,398 units in August, more than halving from a year earlier. By brand, Toyota saw its August sales plunging 59.1 percent on-year to 542 units, while Honda suffered an 80.9 percent on-year sales drop to 138 units and Nissan's car sales down 87.4 percent on-year to 57 units. The Japanese-brand automakers also suffering slump in July, with Toyota sales down 32% from the year earlier and Honda car sales tumbled 33.5% year-on-year. Lexus, South Korea's third-most imported car brand after Mercedes-Benz and BMW, saw sales down 24.6% from the previous month, although that was still up 33% from the previous year, according to data from KAIDA on August 5.

Preliminary data from Korea Customs Service in September said imports of Japanese beer for the month of August 2019 stood at US$223,000, down 97% from $7.57 million a year earlier.

In May 2020, Nissan announced that it will withdraw from South Korea by the end of 2020.

==== Tourism ====
South Korean tourists to Japan

The number of South Korean tourists visiting Japan fell 48% in August to 308,700, the lowest number since May 2016, according to Japan National Tourism Organization (JNTO). However a total number of inbound visitors decreased slightly by 2.2% to 2,520,100 because visitors from other countries increased significantly. Moreover, a surplus in the travel balance was an August record because the average spending increased as a result of the decrease of Korean visitors whose average spending per visitor is less than a half of other countries. On October 16, JNTO reported that the number of South Korean tourists visiting Japan fell 58% in September to 201,200. However a total number of inbound visitors increased 5.2% to 2,272,900. The total spending of inbound visitors from July to September increased 9.0% despite the decrease of Korean visitors.

Some South Korean airlines announced they will reduce flights or suspend direct routes between major Japanese and South Korean cities. For example, Korean Air, the South Korea's largest airline, suspended its Busan-Osaka route on September 16, and routes between Jeju and Narita and between Jeju and Osaka-Kansai from November 1. The airline also temporarily suspended some of its other routes: Incheon-Komatsu and Incheon-Kagoshima both were suspended from September 29 to November 16, and Incheon-Asahikawa suspended from September 26 to October 26. Air Seoul, an Asiana Airlines subsidiary, suspended flights from Incheon to Toyama on September 16 and from Incheon to Kumamoto and Ube from October 27.

As the number of passengers traveling between the two countries is plummeting, Airfares from Japan to South Korea and elsewhere in many airlines dropped to less than $10. CNN reported that it costs as little as 10,000 won ($8.38) to fly one-way from Seoul to Fukuoka on Eastar Jet, and only 1,000 Japanese yen ($9.35) the other way. If it include tax and fuel surcharges, the same route costs 7,590 yen ($71).

=== GSOMIA termination intention and renewal announcement ===
As retaliation against Japan's decision to restrict export of high-tech materials and remove of South Korea from its export "white list," South Korea decided on the termination of the General Security of Military Information Agreement (GSOMIA). The General Security of Military Information Agreement (GSOMIA) is an agreement signed in November 2016 by South Korea and Japan to share sensitive information about threats from North Korea. According to Article 21 of the agreement, the GSOMIA will automatically be renewed for a year unless one of two countries announce a termination notice 90 days prior to the extension of the agreement.

Deputy of Blue House national security office, Kim You-geun, announced on August 22 that South Korea decided to give Japan the required 90-day notice to terminate the military intelligence sharing pact. According to South Korea, Japan did not meet Seoul's "national interests" to maintain the deal. They also stated that Tokyo has failed to communicate a clear explanation for placing controls on certain exports to South Korea. The decisions were announced after hours-long debate in National Security Command (NSC). On the other hand, South Korean Foreign Ministry added that the decision to terminate the military-sharing pact was due to trust issue between the two countries. GSOMIA initially set to expire on November 23, 2019, but South Korea decided to reverse decision to continue the agreement on November 22.

== Concerns and controversies ==
=== Anti-Japanese banner in Jung-gu ===
On August 6, 2019, 1,000 anti-Japan banners were put up in downtown Seoul as local workers began hanging the banners from the streets of Jung District. Days before, on August 5 the district office, which headed by Seo Yang-ho, announced the plan to set the banner ahead of National Liberation day on August 15. But the banner was sparked widespread anger by South Koreans who felt uncomfortable with the banners, as there was a widespread consensus that the anti-Japan movement is to be done by the civilians, not by the government authorities as this action might harm the motivation of anti-Japan movements and undermine the negotiation capability of the government. Then, the district head apologized for the situations and reversed his decision. A Cheong Wa Dae online petition website requesting to bring down the "No Japan" banners, had collected more than 20,000 signatures.

=== Pro-Japanese praising video ===
On August 7, 2019, the chairman of Kolmar Korea, Yoon Dong-han, played a video by a YouTuber named Leeseob TV praising Shinzo Abe and criticizing the Moon Jae-In administration. The video included vulgar language and comments such as "Abe is definitely a great leader and President Moon Jae-in should be thankful for not getting punched by Abe in the face". This video sparked criticism against the chairman and prompted the company to issue an official statement regarding the video on August 9. But online communities were still angered and started to boycott the company's products. The backlash prompted the chairman to issue a public apology on August 11 and the chairman resigned after he apologized to 700 employees of the company. Shares of Kolmar Korea fell 6.2% after the official statement from the company.

=== DHC TV anti-Korean broadcast ===
Starting on August 10, DHC Television, a subsidiary of the Japanese cosmetic manufacturer DHC Corporation, made inflammatory comments about Korea and its history. This sparked anger among South Koreans and prompted DHC Korea to issue an apology on August 13. Professor of General Education Seo Kyoung-duk urged Korean consumers to stop purchasing DHC's products.

== See also ==
- Anti-Japanese sentiment in Korea
- Anti-Korean sentiment in Japan
- China–United States trade war
