= Lee Chang-yang =

South Korean professor of public policy at KAIST

- 이창양
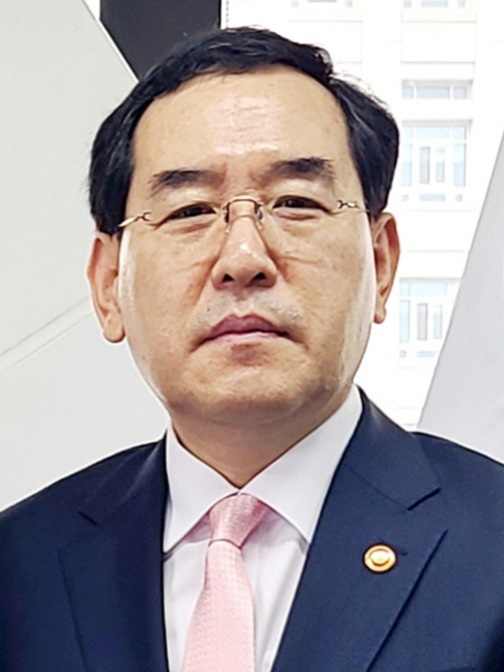

Minister of Trade, Industry and Energy
- In office 12 May 2022 – 19 September 2023
- President: Yoon Suk-yeol
- Prime Minister: Han Duck-soo
- Preceded by: Moon Sung-wook
- Succeeded by: Bang Moon-kyu

Personal details
- Born: 1962 (age 63–64) Goseong, South Gyeongsang, South Korea
- Party: Independent
- Education: Seoul National University (BA); Harvard University (MPA, PhD)

Lee Chang-yang (李昌洋, born 1962) is a South Korean professor of public policy at KAIST who served as the minister of trade, industry and energy under the Yoon Suk-yeol government from 2022 to 2023.
