= European Chamber of Commerce in Korea =

The European Chamber of Commerce in Korea (ECCK) is a non-profit, non-political organization, established to support European businesses operating in or related to Korea. The primary objective of the Chamber is to provide its members with information, communication, and access pertaining to the business and regulatory environment of Korea.

ECCK's headquarter is located in Seoul, South Korea, and a chapter is located in Busan.

== History ==
By registering with the Ministry of Trade, Industry and Energy (South Korea), the ECCK was officially founded as a non-profit, non-political organization on December 3, 2012. The ECCK is not affiliated with any branch of the Korean government.

=== Board of directors ===
The Board of Directors consists of nine elected persons: Chairperson, Vice Chairperson, Director, Treasurer, and Trustee. The Board of Director is responsible for overseeing and making policy decisions for the ECCK.

=== Events ===
The ECCK organizes conferences and seminars of industrial relevance for knowledge sharing. Formal and informal networking events are hosted to encourage information exchange and business relationships. Furthermore, the ECCK also functions as the first point of contact for European executives and officials coming to Korea.

=== Publications ===
As a platform for information exchange, the ECCK circulates publications to inform members of the current market situation, key regulatory issues, and notable social trends in Korea. In addition, the Chamber conducts surveys on the business climate in Korea and interviews to gather industry-expert opinions.

- ECCK White Paper
- Business Confidence Survey
- ECCK Connect (quarterly magazine)
- Monthly newsletter
