= Kim Jung-kwan =

Kim Jung-kwan may refer to:

- Kim Jung-kwan (politician)
- Kim Jung-kwan (fencer)
