= Yeo Han-koo =

South Korean civil servant (born 1969)

- 여한구
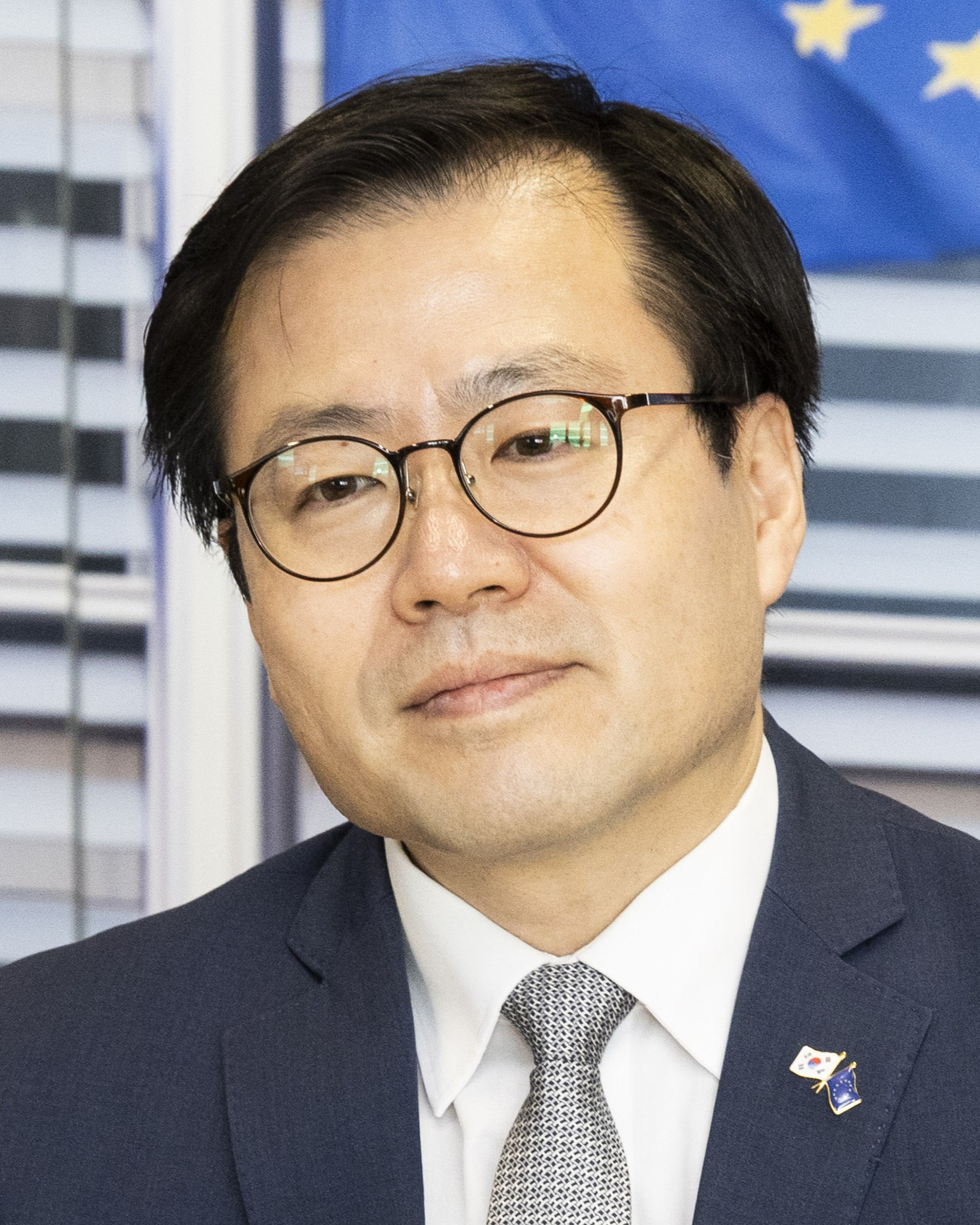
- Yeo in 2026

Minister for Trade
- Incumbent
- In office 11 June 2025 – 14 August 2026
- President: Lee Jae-Myung
- Prime Minister: Kim Min-seok
- Preceded by: Cheong In-kyo
- In office 6 August 2021 – 9 May 2022
- President: Moon Jae-in
- Prime Minister: Chung Sye-kyun; Kim Boo-kyum
- Preceded by: Yoo Myung-hee
- Succeeded by: Ahn Duk-geun

Deputy Minister for FTA Negotiations
- In office 1 March 2019 – 23 July 2020
- President: Moon Jae-in
- Preceded by: Yoo Myung-hee
- Succeeded by: Ahn Duk-geun

Personal details
- Born: 14 November 1969 (age 56) Seoul, South Korea
- Party: Independent
- Education: Seoul National University Harvard University (MPA, MBA)
- Occupation: Trade negotiator, civil servant

Yeo Han-koo (Korean: 여한구; Hanja: 呂翰九, born 14 November 1969) is a South Korean politician who served as the director general of Free Trade Negotiations under President Moon Jae-in from 2021 to 2022. Yeo is considered a veteran trade negotiator and technocrat.

== Early life and education ==
Yeo holds a bachelor's degree in business administration from Seoul National University as well as a Master of Public Administration and an MBA from Harvard University.

== Career ==
=== Early career ===
Over the past 25 years, he worked in various government agencies since he passed the Korean state civil servant exam in 1992. Before promoted to President Moon's third trade minister, Yeo served as his secretary for New Southern and New Northern Policies at Office of the President. Yeo also served as the deputy trade minister after his predecessor Yoo Myung-hee was promoted to the country's first woman trade minister.

Along with various trade related roles in the government, he worked at World Bank Group's International Finance Corporation as its senior investment officer from 2010 to 2014.

=== Minister of Trade (2021–2022) ===
In the first cross-departmental committee on trade Yeo chaired, he proposed five trade topics that its policies should prioritise from supply chain, technology and digital transformation to vaccine and carbon neutrality. Yeo is expected to lead the country's accession to CPTPP and DEPA.
