= Bang Moon-kyu =

South Korean politician

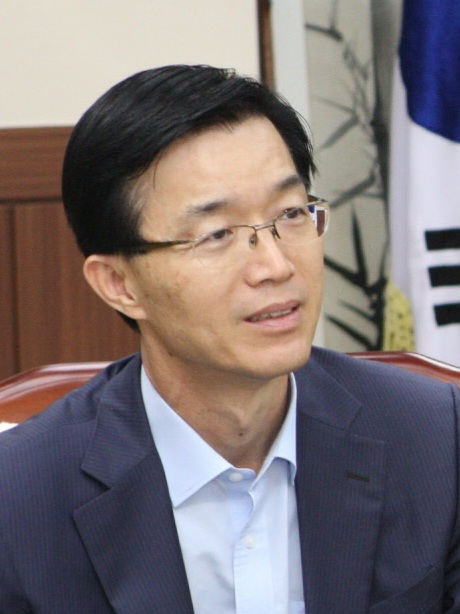
- Bang in 2016

Minister of Trade, Industry and Resources
- In office September 20, 2023 – January 4, 2024
- President: Yoon Suk Yeol
- Preceded by: Lee Chang-yang
- Succeeded by: Ahn Duk-geun

Minister of Government Policy Coordination
- In office June 8, 2022 – August 24, 2023
- President: Yoon Suk Yeol
- Preceded by: Koo Yun-cheol
- Succeeded by: Bang Ki-sun

Vice Minister of Health
- In office 2015–2017

Chairman and CEO of the Export-Import Bank of Korea
- In office 2019–2022

Personal details
- Education: Seoul National University; Harvard Kennedy School

Bang Moon-kyu (Korean: 방문규) is a South Korean politician who served as the minister of government policy coordination from 2022 to 2023 and as the minister of trade, industry and resources from 2023 to 2024.

== Biography ==
Bang obtained an English degree from Seoul National University and a master's degree in Public Administration from the Harvard Kennedy School. Bang passed the Civil Service Exam in 1984.

Bang has held various positions at the Ministry of Economy and Finance, Presidential Office, Ministry of Agriculture, and International Bank for Reconstruction and Development. From 2015 to 2017, Bang was the Vice Minister of Health. From 2019 to 2022, Bang was chairman and CEO of the Export-Import Bank of Korea.

In 2022, Bang became the Minister of Government Policy Coordination. In September 2023, Bang became the Minister of Trade, Industry, and Resources, but he resigned after three months to unsuccessfully attempt at being elected to the National Assembly. Bang was appointed to become ambassador to Indonesia, but he wasn't after President Lee Jae Myung decided to appoint his own ambassador.
