= Paik Un-gyu =

South Korean energy engineer

- 백운규

Minister of Trade, Industry and Energy
- In office 22 July 2017 – 21 September 2018
- President: Moon Jae-in
- Prime Minister: Lee Nak-yeon
- Succeeded by: Sung Yun-mo

Personal details
- Born: 2 March 1964 (age 62) Masan, South Korea
- Party: Independent
- Education: Hanyang University; Virginia Tech; Clemson University

Paik Un-gyu (Korean: 백운규; Hanja: 白雲揆; born 2 March 1964) is a South Korean professor of energy engineering at Hanyang University previously served as President Moon Jae-in's first Minister of Trade, Industry and Energy.

== Education ==
He holds three degrees - a bachelor's in inorganic materials engineering from Hanyang University, a master in material science and engineering from Virginia Tech and a doctorate in ceramic engineering from Clemson University.

== Career ==
Before entering public service in 2017, he worked as a technology advisor to two major semiconductor companies in South Korea, Samsung SDI and SK Hynix.

After joining Hanyang University's faculty in 1999, he has taken multiple leadership roles in his alma mater such as dean of energy engineering department and 3rd engineering college and advisory roles in government institutions such as then-Ministry of Science, ICT and Future Planning, Presidential Advisory Council on Science and Technology and now-Korea Institute of Energy Technology Evaluation and Planning.

He is also a member of editorial board of Scientific Reports's chemistry section and ISRN Ceramics.

== Awards and honors ==
- 2008: Scientist of the Month, Ministry of Science and ICT and National Research Foundation of Korea
