= Kim Hyun-jong =

South Korean diplomat (born 1959)

- 김현종
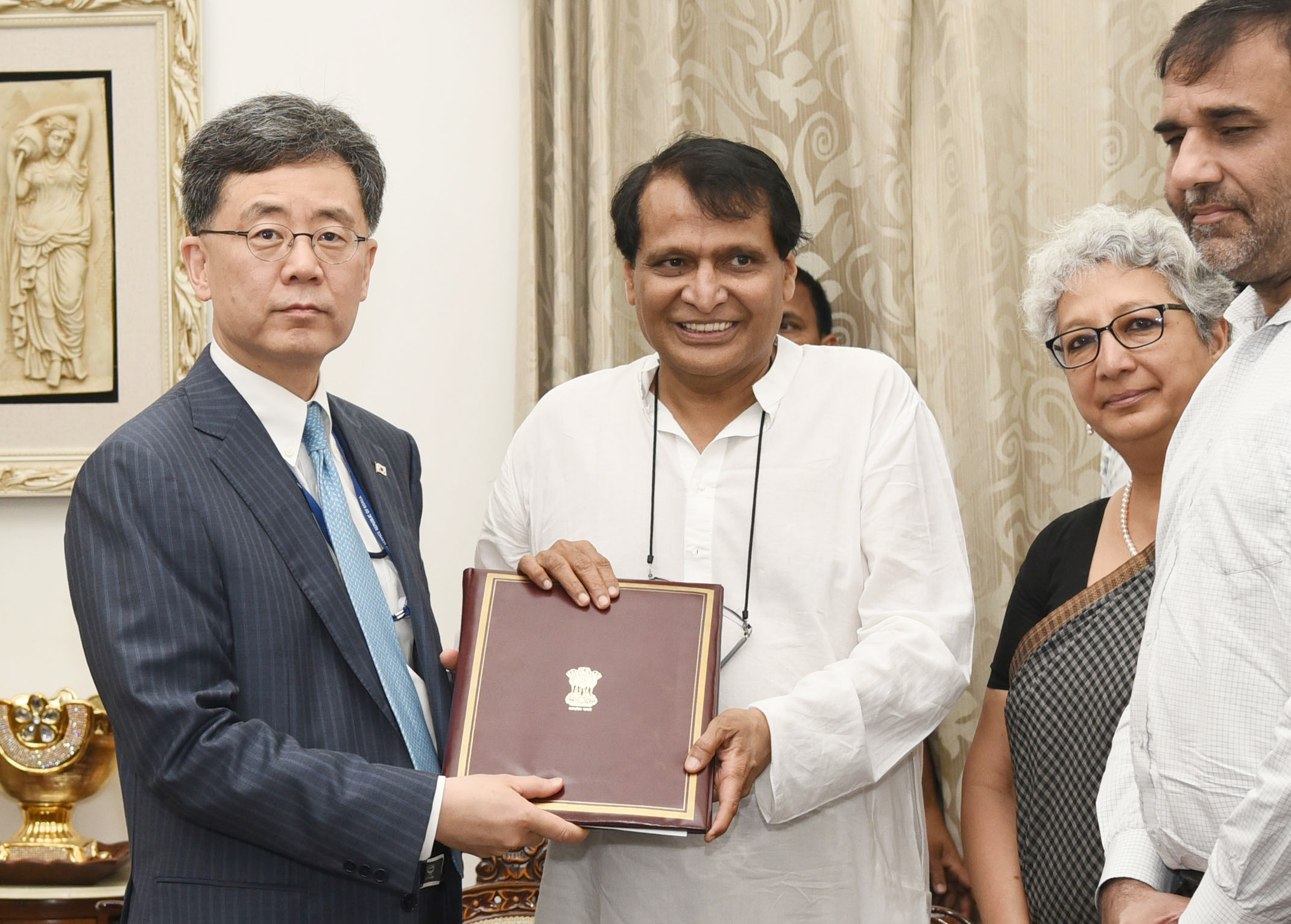
- Minister Kim in 2018(Left)

Special Advisor to the President on Foreign Affairs, Diplomacy and National Security
- In office 20 January 2021 – 10 May 2022
- President: Moon Jae-in
- Preceded by: Chung Eui-yong

2nd Deputy Director of National Security Office
- In office 28 February 2019 – 20 January 2021
- President: Moon Jae-in
- Succeeded by: Kim Hyung-jin

Director General of Free Trade Negotiations
- In office 31 July 2017 – 27 February 2019
- President: Moon Jae-in
- Prime Minister: Lee Nak-yeon
- Succeeded by: Yoo Myung-hee
- In office 28 July 2004 – 8 August 2007
- President: Roh Moo-hyun
- Prime Minister: Lee Hae-chan; Han Myung-sook
- Preceded by: Hwang Doo-yeon
- Succeeded by: Kim Jong-hoon

Personal details
- Born: 27 September 1959 (age 67)
- Education: Columbia University (BA, MA, JD)

Kim Hyun-jong (Korean: 김현종; Hanja: 金鉉宗; born 27 September 1959 in Seoul) is a former Director General of Free Trade Negotiations under Presidents Roh Moo-hyun and Moon Jae-in.

== Early life ==
He holds three degrees from Columbia University: B.A. (1981) and M.A. (1982) in Political Science and a J.D. (1985) from Columbia Law School in New York. He also graduated from Wilbraham & Monson Academy in Massachusetts in 1977.

== Career ==
=== Minister for Trade during Roh administration ===
From May 2003, the very beginning of the Roh administration, as the deputy minister for trade and later the minister for trade, he was one of the most central figures in Roh administration's trade policy for more than 4 years. In particular, he initiated numerous free trade agreement(FTA) plans or talks with Canada, India (CEPA), Mexico, MERCOSUR, GCC, Singapore, EFTA, ASEAN, and United States. The FTAs with Singapore, EFTA, ASEAN, and USA had been signed before he moved to UN. These 4 blocks and Chile (the first nation with which South Korean signed FTA) compose 25.78% of all South Korean trade (according to data in 2006). He was then appointed as the ambassador to the UN, where he spent around 8 months.

=== Minister for Trade during Moon administration ===
Under President Moon, Kim served as his first Trade Minister. He led the re-negotiation of the KORUS FTA. In 2019 he was reshuffled to Office of National Security as its deputy director responsible for coordinating foreign and inter-Korean policies. In 2021 he was again reshuffled to President Moon's Special Advisor on foreign policy.

In June 2025, it was reported that Kim was under consideration to serve in South Korean President Lee Jae-myung's cabinet.

He also took various roles representing South Korean government at the WTO, UN and APEC.Moreover, he previously worked for Milbank LLP, Skadden, Yoon & Yang LLC (then-Kim Shin & Yu) and Samsung Electronics.

He taught international trade at South Korean universities such as Hongik University before working at the Ministry of Industry and Trade and Hankuk University of Foreign Studies after working as a minister for trade.

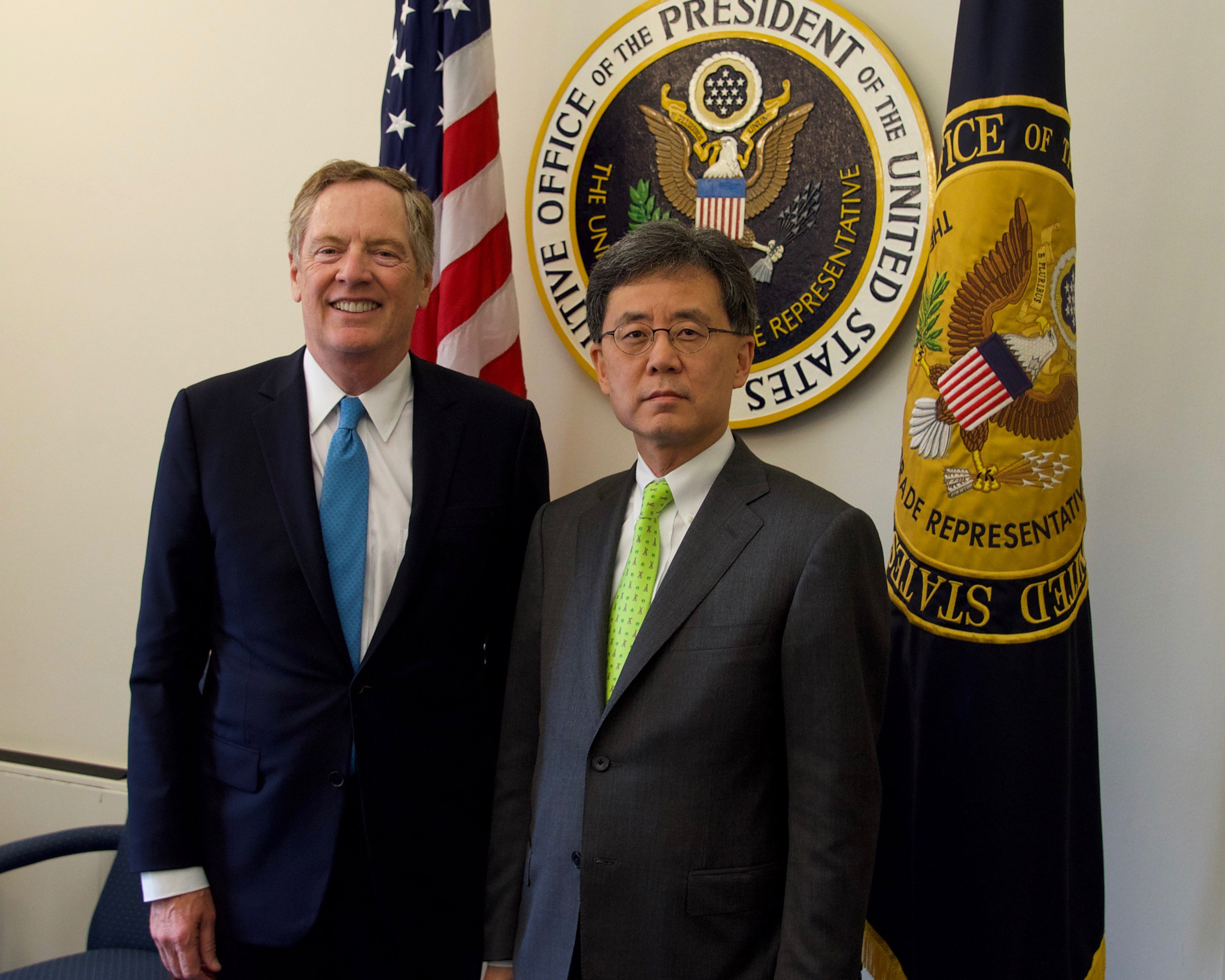
Minister Kim with Robert Lighthizer at USTR

== Honors ==
- Order of Service Merit by the government of South Korea (2009)

== Publications ==
- The Trend of Block Economy and NAFTA (1995)
- When are Government Loans Subsidies? Hanbo Steel and the Application of the WTO Subsidies Agreement (1998)

== See also ==
- United States–Korea Free Trade Agreement
- Lists of free trade agreements
