= Kim Jung-kwan (politician) =

South Korean politician (born 1968)

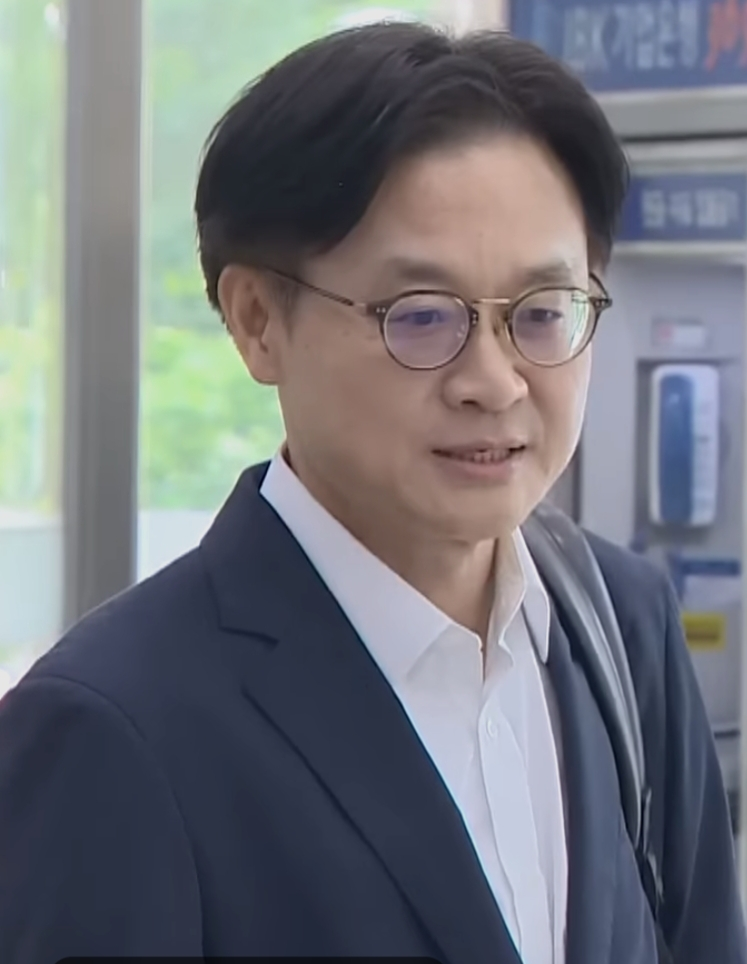
- Kim in 2025

Minister of Trade, Industry, and Reasources
- Incumbent
- Assumed office 19 July 2025
- President: Lee Jae Myung
- Preceded by: Ahn Duk-geun

Personal details
- Born: 1968 (age 57–58) Jangseong County, South Jeolla Province, South Korea
- Education: Seoul National University; University of Missouri

Kim Jung-kwan (Korean: 김정관; born 1968) is a South Korean politician who has served as the minister of trade, industry, and resources in the Cabinet of Lee Jae Myung since 2025.

== Biography ==
Kim was born in 1968 in Jangseong County, South Jeolla Province, South Korea. He majored in economics at Seoul National University and received a master's degree and doctorate from the University of Missouri. Kim previously worked at the Ministry of Finance, the Presidential Secretariat, and the International Bank for Reconstruction and Development. Kim was the CEO of the Doosan Management Institute in 2019.

Kim was nominated to become the Industry Minister in June 2025. In January 2026, Kim met American officials regarding a Korea-US trade deal to avoid tariffs on Korean goods.
