= Yoo Myung-hee =

South Korea bureaucrat

- 유명희
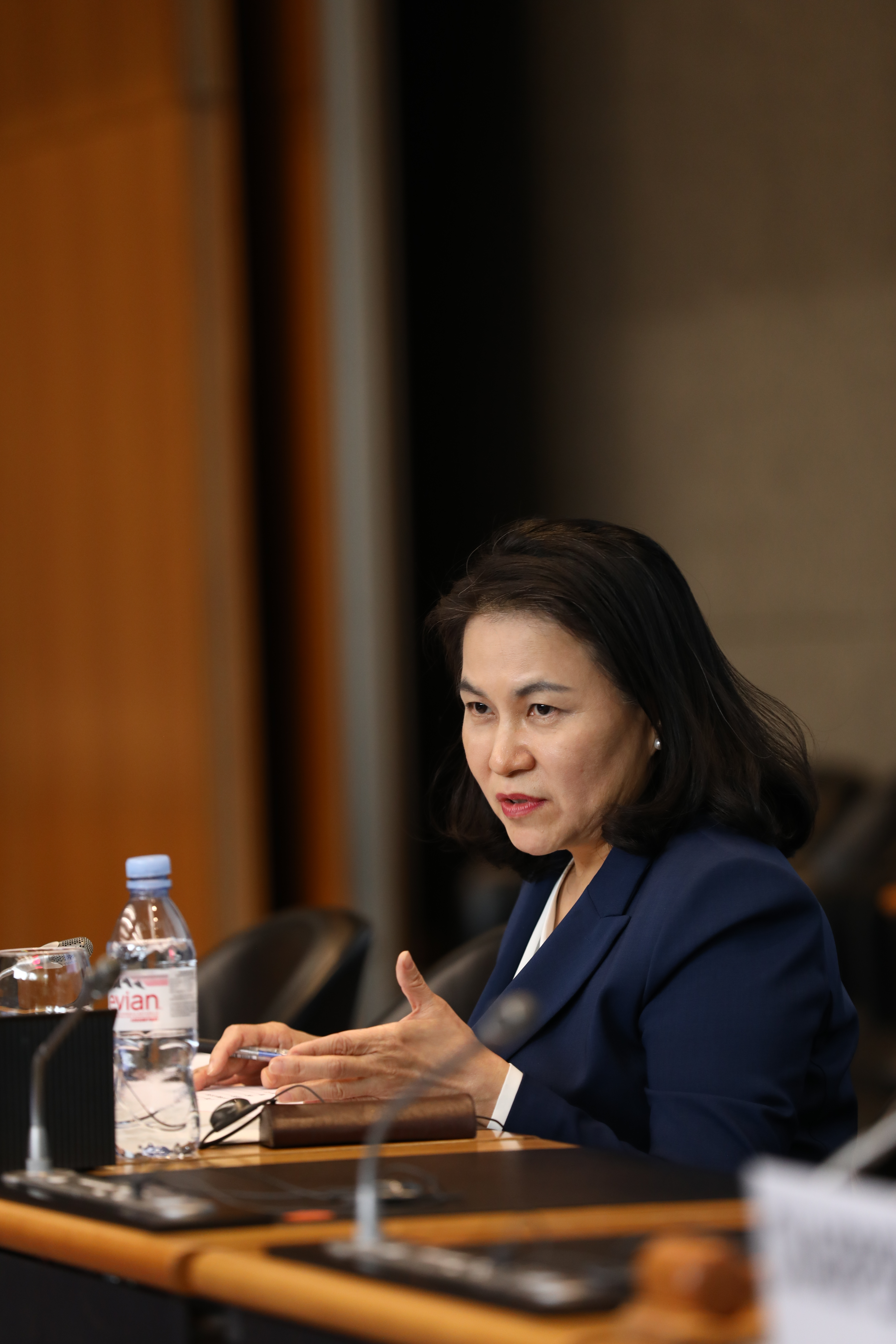

Director General of Free Trade Negotiations
- In office 1 March 2019 – 6 August 2021
- President: Moon Jae-in
- Prime Minister: Chung Sye-kyun
- Preceded by: Kim Hyun-jong
- Succeeded by: Yeo Han-koo

Deputy Minister for FTA Negotiations
- In office 29 January 2018 – 28 February 2019
- President: Moon Jae-in
- Prime Minister: Lee Nak-yeon
- Succeeded by: Yeo Han-koo

Personal details
- Born: 5 June 1967 (age 59) Ulsan, South Korea
- Education: Seoul National University; Vanderbilt University
- Website: www.yoomyunghee.com

Korean name
- Hangul: 유명희
- Hanja: 兪明希
- RR: Yu Myeonghui
- MR: Yu Myŏnghŭi

Yoo Myung-hee (Korean: 유명희, born 5 June 1967) is a South Korean politician who served as the Director General of Free Trade Negotiations of South Korea from 2019 to 2021. She was the first woman to hold the position. Over the past 25 years, she worked in various government agencies since she passed the Korean state civil servant exam in 1991. She is also noted as being the final two candidates in the 2020 World Trade Organization leadership race.

== Early life and education ==
Yoo was born in Ulsan, South Korea in 1967 when Korea was on the verge of high economic growth after having just completed its first 5-year Economic Development Plan (1962–1966) and had set its main economic policy on export-led growth. Her childhood dream was to become a writer due to her creative and thoughtful personality, leading her to study English literature in Seoul National University, where she graduated with a bachelor's degree in English literature and an MA in Public Policy. She also holds a J.D. from Vanderbilt University Law School and was admitted to the New York State Bar in 2003.

== Career ==
=== Ministry of Trade and Industry ===
Yoo first started her career as a civil servant at the Ministry of Government Administration in 1992. As the beginning of her career coincided with the ongoing Uruguay Round negotiations at the WTO, Yoo felt that Korea at this time was in urgent need of trade experts. Backing herself to play a potential role in this respect, Yoo applied for a position at the Ministry of Trade and Industry (now the Ministry of Trade, Industry and Energy) in 1995 and started working at the WTO Division.

Yoo has reflected that at the time of the Uruguay Round negotiations, she witnessed various "disputes and conflicts", which motivated her to represent her country in trade negotiations and devote her life to representing Korea's position. She also noticed that South Korea was the only country among the WTO member states which was not represented by any women in its delegation team, which prompted her to apply for a position at the Ministry of Trade and Industry.

While working at the WTO Division, Yoo participated in subsidies negotiations and wrote a "Guide to WTO Agreement on Subsidies and Countervailing Measures".

=== Ministry of Foreign Affairs and Trade ===
In 1998 after organizational restructuring at the Korean government, Yoo was transferred to the Ministry of Foreign Affairs and Trade.

Yoo at this time, felt the need to gain legal expertise in order to better understand trade, and she went on to study for a Juris Doctor degree at Vanderbilt University Law School. She was later admitted to the New York State bar in 2003.

After returning to Korea in 2003, Yoo participated in the formation of the Korea-Singapore FTA. Yoo was also known for her affection and passion for trade, and was sometimes likened to former US Trade Representative Carla Hills.

She subsequently served as the Director for the FTA Policy Division, and was in charge of the Services and Competition Working Group during the Korea-US (KORUS) FTA negotiations. During the negotiations, the US delegation jokingly remarked that it was unfair that while they did not understand Korean law well, Yoo was very knowledgeable when it came to US law.

As many of Korea's FTAs, especially KORUS FTA, were subject to intense opposition from interested parties, Yoo once acknowledged that coordinating between divergent positions among interested parties domestically is more difficult than engaging in official negotiations with a foreign country. She therefore believes that it is important to create rules that govern negotiations as well as establish a system that allows for greater coordination between different interests.

From 2007 to 2010, Yoo was dispatched to the Korean Embassy in Beijing, China as the First Secretary and Counsellor. After completing her occupation in China, she relocated her position to Singapore to the APEC (Asia-Pacific Economic Cooperation) headquarters where she served as Program Director in the APEC Secretariat for 4 years until 2014.

In 2014, Yoo was appointed as Spokesperson for Foreign Media at the Office of the President of Korea, where she served until 2015.

=== Ministry of Trade, Industry and Energy ===
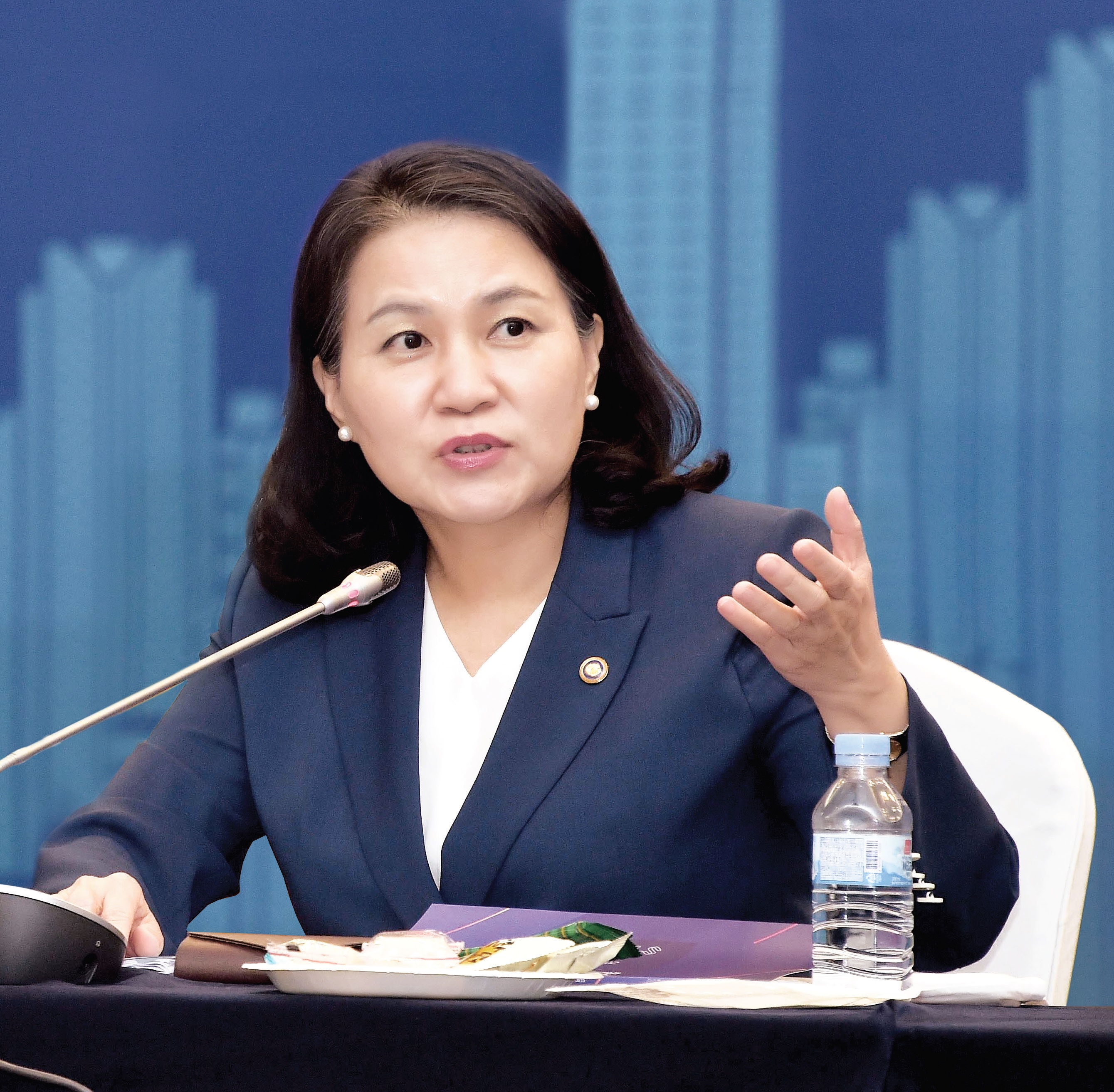
Minister Yoo Myung-hee delivering her speech at the inauguration ceremony for 2030 Busan World Expo project, June 2020

After further organizational restructuring at the Korean government in 2013, the Ministry of Trade, Industry and Energy (MOTIE) was formed. Yoo was transferred back to MOTIE, where she continued to expand her career as "the first female Director-General", "the first female Deputy Minister for Trade" and "the first female Minister for Trade". As a result of these accomplishments, she has earned the nickname "the glass-ceiling breaker".

In 2015, Yoo was appointed as the Director-General for FTA Negotiations and East Asia FTA. As Chief Negotiator for Korea, Yoo played a role in finalizing the Korea-China FTA negotiations, which entered into effect in 2015.

In 2018 she was promoted to the position of Deputy Minister for Trade and successfully served as Chief Negotiator for the KORUS FTA amendment negotiations, playing the role of "Devil's Advocate" while working alongside Trade Minister Kim Hyun-jong while assisting him in the team. The role of Devil's Advocate is well known as a useful tool in trade negotiations to prevent a group from leaning only to one side.

In 2019, Yoo was appointed as Minister for Trade becoming the first woman to assume the post and the highest ranking woman in the Ministry. As Minister for Trade, Yoo played a key role in the conclusion of text-based negotiations for the Regional Comprehensive Economic Partnership (RCEP) in 2019, providing viable alternatives to reach a common ground among participating countries at varying levels of development.

In addition, she has concluded the Korea-UK FTA in 2019, taking into consideration various Brexit scenarios into the agreement. She also concluded the Korea-Indonesia CEPA that featured a strong chapter on bilateral cooperation.

As a result of the COVID-19 pandemic, Yoo introduced in June 2020 the "Post COVID-19 Trade Policy" to reset Korea's trade policy in response to changes in the international trade environment. In this initiative, she emphasized international cooperation and rule-setting in particular, in light of advancing the digital economy and recognizing and embracing the evolving global value chain for better recognition and utilization by stakeholders and industries.

=== Nomination to the World Trade Organization ===
In June 2020, the Republic of Korea officially nominated Yoo as the country's candidate for the Director-General of the World Trade Organization and Yoo officially declared her bid to run for the election.

However, given the election of Joe Biden to the US presidency and in the face of widespread support for her rival Dr Ngozi Okonjo-Iweala, a Harvard-trained development economist and former Managing Director of the World Bank, Nigerian Minister of Finance and Minister of Foreign Affairs, Yoo withdrew her bid on February 5, 2021. Yoo's withdrawal follows an announcement by the WTO which said in October 2020 that Ngozi Okonjo-Iweala had garnered more support than Yoo from the WTO's 164 member states.

In August 2021, Yoo retired as trade minister after 29 years in public service.

In November 2022, Yoo was appointed on the board of directors of Samsung Electronics. She also serves as a senior adviser (non-resident) for Center for Strategic and International Studies (CSIS).

== Personal life ==
Yoo is married to Jeong Tae-ok, a former civil servant and politician who served as a National Assembly member and spokesman of the main opposition party. She has one son and one daughter.
