= Moon Sung-wook =

South Korean government official

- 문승욱
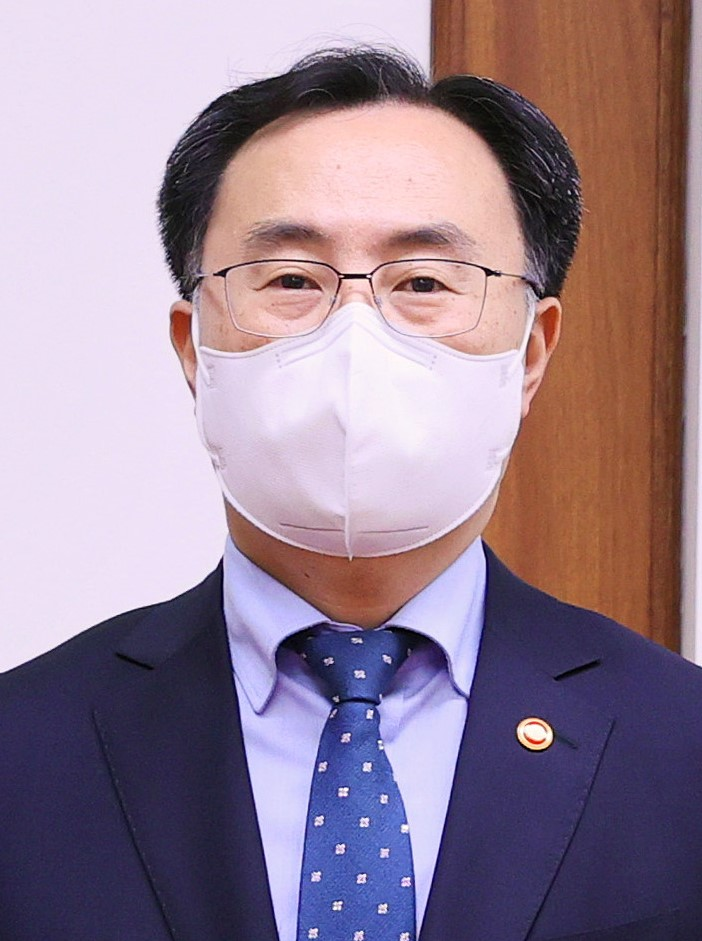

Minister of Trade, Industry and Energy
- In office 6 May 2021 – 12 May 2022
- President: Moon Jae-in
- Prime Minister: Kim Boo-kyum
- Preceded by: Sung Yun-mo
- Succeeded by: Lee Chang-yang

2nd Deputy Minister for Government Policy Coordination
- In office 8 May 2020 – 16 April 2021
- President: Moon Jae-in
- Minister: Noh Hyeong-ouk; Koo Yun-cheol
- Preceded by: Cha Young-hwan
- Succeeded by: Yoon Chang-ryeol

Deputy Governor for Economy of South Gyeongsang (Note: Deputy Governor for Western South Gyeongsang until 1 August 2018.)
- In office 30 July 2018 – 8 May 2020
- Governor: Kim Kyoung-soo
- Preceded by: Cho Kyu-il
- Succeeded by: Park Jong-won

Deputy Minister of Defence Acquisition Programme Administration
- In office 4 February 2016 – 12 October 2017
- President: Park Geun-hye; Moon Jae-in
- Minister: Koo Yun-cheol
- Preceded by: Chin Yang-hyun
- Succeeded by: Yoo Jung-yeol

Personal details
- Born: 24 December 1965 (age 60) Seoul, South Korea
- Party: Independent
- Education: Yonsei University; Seoul National University; Harvard University
- Occupation: Government official

Moon Sung-wook (Korean: 문승욱, born 1965) is a South Korean government official served as Minister of Trade, Industry and Energy from 2021 to 2022. He previously served as the 2nd Deputy Minister for Government Policy Coordination from 2020 to 2021, the Deputy Governor of South Gyeongsang from 2018 to 2020, and the Deputy Minister of Defence Acquisition Programme Administration from 2016 to 2017.

== Career ==
His career has begun after qualifying for the Public Administration Examination in 1989. He used to work together with Kim Kyoung-soo at the Blue House under the former President Roh Moo-hyun. He served various positions at the Ministry of Knowledge Economy, and then the Ministry of Trade, Industry and Energy from 2008 to 2018.

Moon was appointed the Deputy Minister of Defence Acquisition Programme Administration during the Park Geun-hye government in February 2016. He remained at the position after Moon Jae-in was elected the President in 2017, until he was replaced by Yoo Jung-yeol in October 2017.

After Kim Kyoung-soo was elected the Governor of South Gyeongsang in the 2018 local elections, Moon was nominated the Deputy Governor for Economy in July 2018. He served for about 2 years until he was appointed the 2nd Deputy Minister for Government Policy Coordination on 8 May 2020.

On 16 April 2021, President Moon Jae-in nominated him as the new Minister of Trade, Industry and Energy.

== Education ==
Moon attended Sungdong High School before entering to Yonsei University to study Bachelor in Economics. He is also graduated from Master in Public Administration at Seoul National University and Harvard University.
