= Sung Yun-mo =

South Korean politician

- 성윤모
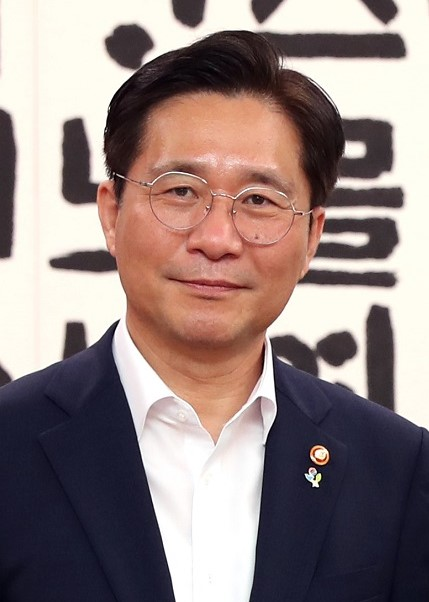
- A picture of Sung Yun-mo

Minister of Trade, Industry and Energy
- In office 21 September 2018 – 6 May 2021
- President: Moon Jae-in
- Prime Minister: Lee Nak-yeon; Chung Sye-kyun
- Preceded by: Paik Un-gyu
- Succeeded by: Moon Sung-wook

Commissioner of Korean Intellectual Property Office
- In office 26 July 2017 – 21 September 2019
- President: Moon Jae-in
- Prime Minister: Lee Nak-yeon
- Succeeded by: Park Won-joo

Personal details
- Born: 27 June 1963 (age 63) Daejeon, South Korea
- Party: Independent
- Education: Seoul National University; University of Missouri

Sung Yun-mo (Korean: 성윤모; Hanja: 成允模; born 27 June 1963) is a South Korean politician previously served as the Minister of Trade, Industry and Energy under President Moon Jae-in from 2018 to 2021.

Before promoted to Minister, he was President Moon's first Commissioner of Korean Intellectual Property Office - a vice-ministerial post. He was previously spokesperson of the Ministry and Deputy Minister of Economic Policy Coordination at Office for Government Policy Coordination under preceding president Park Geun-hye.

After passing the state exam in 1988, he has built his career solely in public service. He worked at numerous industry-related departments including now-Ministry of Economy and Finance, now-Ministry of SMEs and Startups, and Ministry of Trade, Industry and Energy.

Sung holds three degrees - a bachelor in economics and master's in policy studies from Seoul National University and a doctorate in economics from University of Missouri.
