= Nachi-Fujikoshi =

Japanese corporation

Nachi-Fujikoshi Corp.
- Native name: 株式会社不二越
- Company type: Public KK
- Traded as: TYO: 6474
- Industry: Electric machinery / Robotics / Hydraulic machinery / Advanced materials
- Founded: Toyama, Japan (December 21, 1928; 97 years ago)
- Founder: Kohki Imura
- Headquarters: 1-1-1 Fujikoshi-Honmachi, Toyama 930-8511, Japan
- Key people: Hiroo Honma (President and CEO)
- Products: Cutting tools; Machine tools; Precision machinery; Industrial robots; Bearings; Hydraulic equipment
- Revenue: ▲US$ 1.71 billion (FY 2013) (¥ 175.69 billion) (FY 2013)
- Net income: ▲US$ 65.47 million (FY 2013) (¥ 6.7 billion) (FY 2013)
- Owner: Toyota (5.29%)
- Number of employees: 6,072 (consolidated as of January 16, 2014)
- Website: Official website

Nachi-Fujikoshi Corp. (株式会社不二越, Kabushiki-gaisha Fujikoshi) (known also by its trademark Nachi) is a Japanese corporation known for its industrial robots, machining tools and systems and machine components.

Nachi-Fujikoshi is listed on the Tokyo Stock Exchange and as of January 2014, comprises 50 companies (22 domestic and 28 overseas).

== Origin of the Nachi trademark ==
The Nachi brand name comes from "Kumano Nachi Taisha", the Grand Shrine. It expresses strong entrepreneurial will.

In 1929, the Emperor Showa made a tour of the Kansai district to inspect industries as part of the encouragement of domestic production, and personally inspected a Fujikoshi hacksaw blade that was on display as an example of an outstanding domestic product at the Osaka Prefectural Office. Overjoyed at the honor of entertaining the Emperor's special attention, Kohki Imura decided to name his product "NACHI" after the name of the latest naval cruiser to be made in Japan, the very same vessel that the Emperor was sailing on for his tour.

== History ==
Founded in 1928 in Toyama City, Japan, Nachi-Fujikoshi was established under the leadership of Kohki Imura. Originally focused on the production of cutting and machine tools, by 1929, the company had expanded its offerings to include hacksaw blades, which received an endorsement from Emperor Showa.

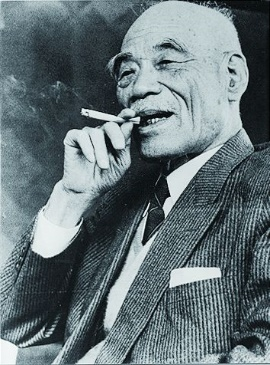
Founder of Nachi-Fujikoshi, Kohki Imura

== Business segments and products ==
=== Machining ===
- Cutting tools
  - Drills
  - End mills
  - Gear cutters
  - Broaches
- Machine tools
  - Broaching machines
  - Precision roll forming machines
  - Power finishers

=== Robots ===
- Spot welding
- Handling
- Arc welding
- Controller systems

=== Components ===
- Bearings
  - Excel series radial ball bearings
  - Radial roller bearings
  - Thrust ball bearings
  - Thrust roller bearings
- Hydraulic equipment
  - Valves
  - Motors
  - Pumps
  - Units

=== Materials ===
- Special steels
- Industrial furnaces
- Ion plating equipment for mass production processing

== See also ==
- Industrial robot
- Manufacturing in Japan
