= Ahn Duk-geun =

South Korean academic (born 1968)

- 안덕근
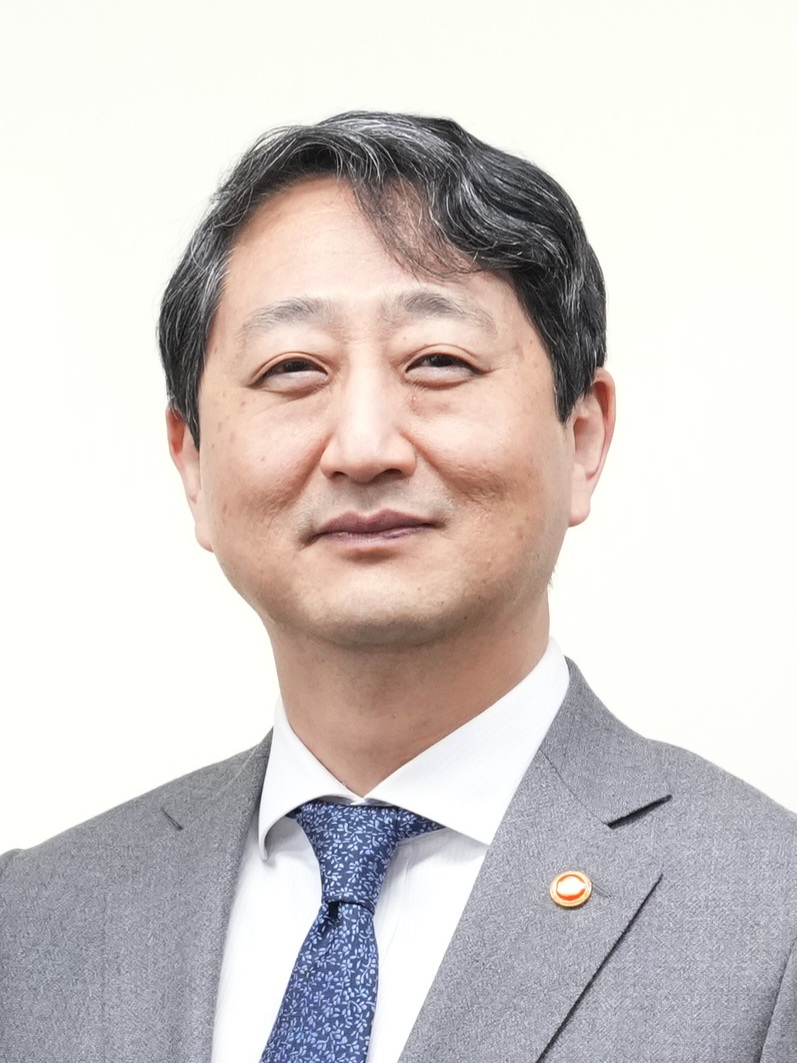
- Ahn in 2023

Minister of Trade, Industry and Energy
- In office 4 January 2024 – 18 July 2025
- President: Yoon Suk Yeol; Han Duck-soo (Acting); Choi Sang-mok (Acting); Lee Ju-ho (Acting); Lee Jae Myung
- Prime Minister: Han Duck-soo; Choi Sang-mok (Acting); Lee Ju-ho (Acting); Kim Min-seok
- Preceded by: Bang Moon-kyu
- Succeeded by: Kim Jung-kwan

Personal details
- Born: 21 April 1968 (age 58) Daegu, South Korea
- Education: Seoul National University (BA); University of Michigan (PhD, JD)

Ahn Duk-geun (Korean: 안덕근; born 21 April 1968) is a South Korean economist who served as the minister of trade, industry and energy from 2024 to 2025. He was a professor at the Korea Development Institute's Graduate School of Public Policy and Management.

== Career ==
He earned a bachelor's degree in international economics from Seoul National University in 1990 and a doctorate from the University of Michigan in 1996.

From 2000 to 2005, he served as a professor at the Graduate School of Public Policy and Management at the Korea Development Institute and led the school's Information Technology Center and Trade Strategy Center.

He also served as an advisor to the Ministry of Foreign Affairs and the Ministry of Trade, Industry and Energy.

== See also ==
- Cabinet of South Korea
- Cabinet of Yoon Suk Yeol
