= Ministry of Trade, Industry and Resources =

Government ministry of South Korea

- 산업통상부

- MOTIR headquarters in Sejong City

Agency overview
- Formed: July 17, 1948 (as Ministry of Commerce); March 23, 2013
- Preceding agencies: Ministry of Commerce (1948–1993); Ministry of Energy (1978–1993); Ministry of Commerce and Energy (1993–1994); Ministry of Trade and Energy (1994–1998); Ministry of Industry and Energy (1998–2008); Ministry of Knowledge Economy (2008–2013)
- Jurisdiction: Government of South Korea
- Headquarters: Sejong City, South Korea
- Minister responsible: Kim Jung-kwan
- Deputy Minister responsible: Moon Shin-Hak - Vice Minister; Yeo Han-koo - Head of Trade Negotiations Division
- Website: www.motir.go.kr

Korean name
- Hangul: 산업통상부
- Hanja: 産業通商部
- RR: Saneop tongsangbu
- MR: Sanŏp t'ongsangbu

The Ministry of Trade, Industry and Resources (MOTIR; Korean: 산업통상부) is a ministry under the Government of South Korea. It is concerned with regulating economic policy, especially with regard to the industrial and resources sectors. The ministry also works to encourage foreign investment in Korea.

The current minister is Kim Jeong-kwan.

== History ==
=== Ministry of Commerce (1948-1993) ===
The ministry began in 1948 as the Ministry of Commerce during the First Republic. In 1993, it was merged with the Ministry of Energy, established in 1977. A year later the ministry changed its name to Ministry of Trade and Energy.

=== Ministry of Trade and Energy (1994-1998) ===
In 1998, it transferred trade negotiation duties to the foreign ministry changing its name to Ministry of Industry and Energy.

=== Ministry of Industry and Energy (1998-2008) ===
In 1998, it changed its name to Ministry of Industry and Energy, not changing any fundamental structures.

=== Ministry of Knowledge Economy (2008-2013) ===
In 2008, it was restructured into Ministry of Knowledge Economy following newly elected president Lee Myung-bak's cabinet reorganization.

=== Ministry of Trade, Industry and Energy (2013-2025) ===
In 2013, following President Park Geun-hye's cabinet reorganisation the ministry was restructured into the current form bringing back trade negotiation duties from the foreign ministry. In 2017, it delegated duties related to SMEs to newly created Ministry of SMEs and Startups under President Moon Jae-in. In 2018, it added the third vice ministerial role for energy policies in addition to existing trade minister and vice minister (now 1st vice minister).

=== Ministry of Trade, Industry and Resources (2025-present) ===
In 2025, newly elected President Lee Jae Myung's cabinet reorganisation transferred the energy sector to the Ministry of Climate, Energy and Environment, another government branch that was reorganized from Ministry of Environment.

== Headquarters ==
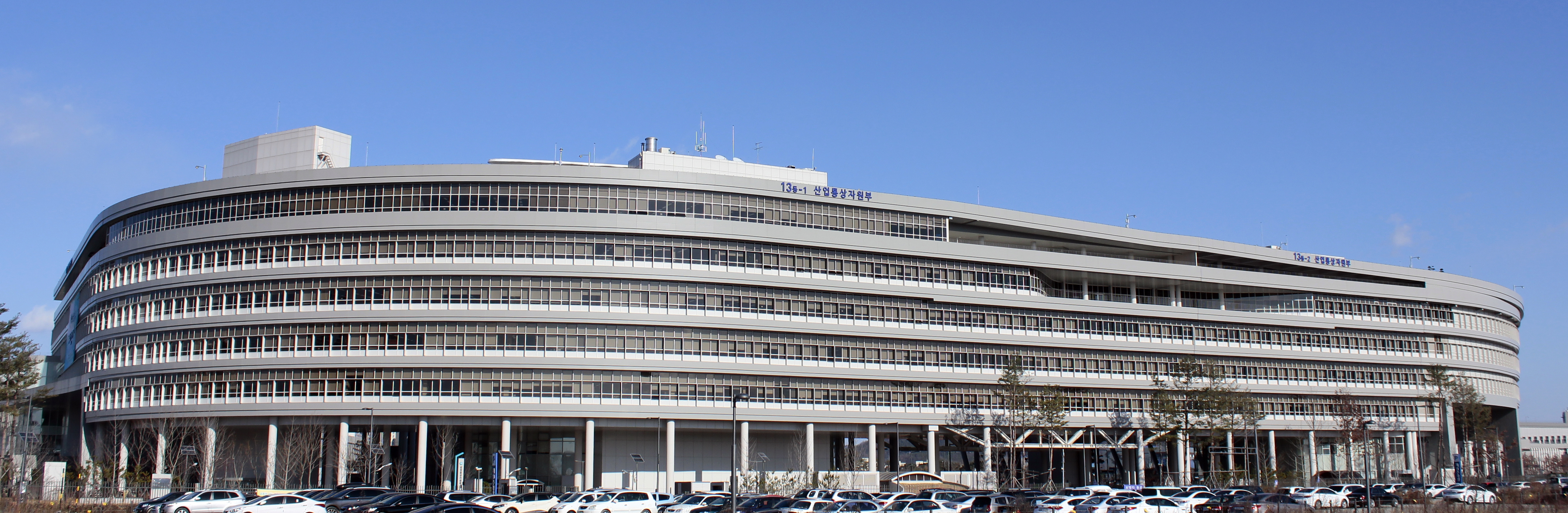
MOTI headquarters at Sejong city

The headquarters are located in the Sejong Regional Government Complex in Sejong City. The headquarters were formerly located in the Gwacheon Government Complex in Gwacheon, Gyeonggi Province.

=== Subsidiary sections ===
Subsidiary organisations of the MOTIR include:

- Korean Agency for Technology and Standards
- Korea Trade Commission (not to be confused with the country's anti-trust agency Fair Trade Commission)
- Mine Registration Office
- Electricity Regulatory Committee
- Free Economic Zone Planning Office

== Organization ==
=== List of ministers ===
List of Ministers from 1948 to the present.

Portrait	Name	Term of office		President
Portrait	Name	Took office	Left office	President
	Im Yeong-sin	4 August 1948	6 June 1949	Syngman Rhee
	Yun Po-sun	6 June 1949	9 March 1950	Syngman Rhee
	Kim Hoon	9 May 1950	27 March 1952	Syngman Rhee
	Lee Kyo-seon	27 March 1952	26 November 1952	Syngman Rhee
	Lee Jae-hyung	6 November 1952	7 October 1953	Syngman Rhee
	An Dong-hyuk	7 October 1953	30 June 1954	Syngman Rhee
	Park Hee-hyun	30 June 1954	5 July 1954	Syngman Rhee
	Kang Sung-tae	5 July 1954	16 September 1955	Syngman Rhee
	Kim Il-hwan	16 September 1955	27 August 1958	Syngman Rhee
	Gu Yong-seo	27 August 1958	8 April 1960	Syngman Rhee
	Kim Yeong-chan	8 April 1960	28 April 1960	Syngman Rhee
	Jeon Taekbo	28 April 1960	2 June 1960	Syngman Rhee
	Oh Jung-soo	2 June 1960	1 July 1960	Syngman Rhee
	Lee Tai-young	23 August 1960	12 September 1960	Yun Po-sun
	Chu Yo-han	12 September 1960	3 May 1961	Yun Po-sun
	Tae Wan-sun	3 May 1961	18 May 1961	Yun Po-sun
	Chung Rae-hyuk	20 May 1961	10 July 1962	Yun Po-sun
	Yoo Chang-soon	10 July 1962	8 February 1963	Yun Po-sun
	Park Choong-hoon	8 January 1963	10 October 1963	Yun Po-sun
	Kim Hoon	10 August 1963	16 December 1963	Yun Po-sun
	Lee Byung-ho	16 December 1963	11 May 1964	Park Chung Hee
	Park Choong-hoon	11 May 1964	3 October 1967	Park Chung Hee
	Kim Chung-ryum	12 June 1964	26 January 1966	Park Chung Hee
	Lee Nak-sun	20 October 1969	2 December 1973	Park Chung Hee
	Chang Yei-joon	2 December 1973	19 December 1977	Park Chung Hee
	Choi Gak-kyu	19 December 1977	13 December 1979	Park Chung Hee
	Chung Jai-suk	13 December 1979	5 July 1979	Choi Kyu-hah
	Shin Byeong-hyun	5 July 1979	2 September 1980	Choi Kyu-hah
	Seo Seok-jun	2 September 1980	21 May 1982	Chun Doo-hwan
	Kim Dong-hwi	21 May 1982	9 October 1983	Chun Doo-hwan
	Keum Jin-ho	15 October 1983	27 August 1986	Chun Doo-hwan
	Rha Woong-bae	27 August 1986	25 January 1988	Chun Doo-hwan
	An Byung-hwa	25 January 1988	5 December 1988	Roh Tae-woo
	Han Seung-soo	5 December 1988	19 March 1990	Roh Tae-woo
	Park Pil-soo	19 March 1990	27 December 1990	Roh Tae-woo
	Lee Bong-seo	27 December 1990	20 December 1991	Roh Tae-woo
	Han Bong-soo	20 December 1991	26 February 1993	Roh Tae-woo
	Kim Chul-soo	26 February 1993	24 December 1994	Kim Young-sam
	Park Jae-yoon	24 December 1994	19 December 1996	Kim Young-sam
	Ahn Kwang-gu	19 December 1996	6 March 1997	Kim Young-sam
	Lim Chang-yeul	6 March 1997	18 November 1997	Kim Young-sam
	Jung Hae-joo	19 November 1997	2 March 1998	Kim Young-sam
	Park Tae-young	3 March 1998	23 May 1999	Kim Dae-jung
	Jeong Teok-koo	25 May 1999	13 January 2000	Kim Dae-jung
	Kim Young-ho	14 January 2000	6 August 2000	Kim Dae-jung
	Shin Guk-hwan	7 August 2000	25 March 2001	Kim Dae-jung
	Jang Jae-sik	26 March 2001	28 January 2002	Kim Dae-jung
	Shin Guk-hwan	29 January 2002	27 February 2003	Kim Dae-jung
	Yoon Jin-sik	27 February 2003	16 February 2003	Roh Moo-hyun
	Lee Hee-beom	17 December 2003	10 January 2006	Roh Moo-hyun
	Chung Sye-kyun	10 January 2006	29 January 2007	Roh Moo-hyun
	Kim Young-joo	29 January 2007	28 February 2008	Roh Moo-hyun
	Lee yun-ho	29 February 2008	18 September 2009	Lee Myung-bak
	Choi Kyung-hwan	19 September 2009	26 January 2011	Lee Myung-bak
	Choi Jung-kyung	27 January 2011	27 september 2011	Lee Myung-bak
	Hong Seok-woo	17 November 2011	11 March 2013	Lee Myung-bak
	Yoon Sang-jick	11 March 2013	13 January 2016	Park Geun-hye
	Joo Hyung-hwan	13 January 2016	21 July 2017	Park Geun-hye
	Paik Un-gyu	22 July 2017	21 September 2018	Moon Jae-in
	Sung Yun-mo	21 September 2018	6 May 2021	Moon Jae-in
	Moon Sung-wook	6 May 2021	12 May 2022	Moon Jae-in
	Lee Chang-yang	12 May 2022	19 September 2023	Yoon Suk Yeol
	Bang Moon-kyu	20 September 2023	4 January 2024	Yoon Suk Yeol
	Ahn Duk-geun	4 January 2024	18 July 2025	Yoon Suk Yeol
	Kim Jung-kwan	19 July 2025	Incumbent	Lee Jae Myung

=== Minister ===
- Policy Advisor to the Minister
- Director General for Audit and Inspection

=== Minister for Trade ===
- Deputy Minister for Trade

==== Office of FTA Negotiations ====
- Director General for FTA Policy
- Director General for FTA Negotiations
- East Asia FTA Bureau

==== Office of International Trade and Legal Affairs ====
- Director General for International Trade Affairs
- Director General for Trade Legal Affairs and Public Relations

==== Office of International Trade and Investment ====
- Director General for International Trade Policy
- Director General for Cross-Border Investment Policy
- Director General for Domestic Policy on Trade
- Director General for Trade Controls Policy

=== 1st Vice Minister ===
==== Office of Planning and Coordination ====
- Director General for Policy Coordination
- Director General for Emergency and Security Planning

==== Office of Industrial Policy ====
- Director General for Industrial Policy
- Director General for Materials and Components Industries
- Director General for Manufacturing Industry

==== Office of Industry and Enterprise Innovation ====
- Director General for Industrial Technology Convergence Policy
- Director General for Regional Economic Policy
- Director General for Middle Market Enterprise Policy

=== 2nd Vice Minister ===
==== Office of Energy Industry ====
- Director General for Energy Transition Policy Policy
- Director General for Electricity Innovation Policy
- Director General for Renewable Energy Policy
- Director General for Hydrogen Economy Policy

== See also ==
- Government of South Korea
- List of government agencies of South Korea
- Economy of South Korea
