= Free trade agreements of South Korea =

South Korea has concluded free trade agreements (FTAs) and other agreements with a trade component with countries around the world and is negotiating with others.

== Trade agreements in force ==

No.	State	Commenced negotiation	Officially Signed	Fully enforced	Notes
1	Chile	14 December 1999	15 February 2003	1 April 2004	South Korea's first-ever FTA
2	Singapore	27 January 2004	4 August 2005	2 March 2006	
3	European Free Trade Association (Iceland,Liechtenstein,Norway and Switzerland)	18 January 2005	15 December 2005	1 September 2006	South Korea's first FTA with a regional block
4	ASEAN (Brunei,Cambodia,Indonesia, Laos, Malaysia,Myanmar,Philippines, Singapore, Thailand and Vietnam)	23 February 2005	24 August 2006 (goods)	1 June 2007 (goods)	agreements on goods, service and investment signed gradually from 2006 to 2009; agreement on goods enforced in 2007 and others in 2009
4	ASEAN (Brunei,Cambodia,Indonesia, Laos, Malaysia,Myanmar,Philippines, Singapore, Thailand and Vietnam)	23 February 2005	21 November 2007 (service)	1 May 2009 (service)	agreements on goods, service and investment signed gradually from 2006 to 2009; agreement on goods enforced in 2007 and others in 2009
4	ASEAN (Brunei,Cambodia,Indonesia, Laos, Malaysia,Myanmar,Philippines, Singapore, Thailand and Vietnam)	23 February 2005	2 June 2009 (investment)	1 September 2009 (investment)	agreements on goods, service and investment signed gradually from 2006 to 2009; agreement on goods enforced in 2007 and others in 2009
5	India	23 March 2006	7 August 2009	1 January 2010	see Comprehensive Economic Partnership Agreement between India and South Korea
6	European Union and its member states	7 May 2007	6 October 2010	(1 July 2011) 13 December 2015	see European Union–South Korea Free Trade Agreement; enforced provisionally from 2011 and fully from 2015; EU's first trade agreement with environmental and labour components
7	Peru	16 March 2009	21 March 2011	1 August 2011	see South Korea–Peru Free Trade Agreement
8	United States	5 June 2006	30 June 2007	15 March 2012	see United States–Korea Free Trade Agreement; signed under Obama administration and revised under Trump administration
8	United States	5 January 2018 (revised)	24 September 2018 (revised)	1 January 2019 (revised)	see United States–Korea Free Trade Agreement; signed under Obama administration and revised under Trump administration
9	Turkey	26 April 2010	1 August 2012 (framework and goods)	1 May 2013 (framework and goods)	on framework and goods initially and service and investment three years later
9	Turkey	26 April 2010	26 May 2015 (service and investment)	1 August 2018 (service and investment)	on framework and goods initially and service and investment three years later
10	Australia	19 May 2009	8 April 2014	12 December 2014	see Australia–Korea Free Trade Agreement
11	Canada	28 July 2005	22 September 2014	1 January 2015	see Canada–Korea Free Trade Agreement
12	China	14 May 2012	1 June 2015	20 December 2015	see China–South Korea Free Trade Agreement
13	New Zealand	8 June 2009	23 March 2015	20 December 2015	
14	Vietnam	6 August 2012	5 May 2015	20 December 2015	
15	Colombia	7 December 2009	21 February 2013	15 July 2016	
16	Central America (Panama, Costa Rica, Honduras, El Salvador and Nicaragua)	18 June 2015	21 February 2018	1 March 2021	Later, Guatemala joined as a new member of the agreement.
17	United Kingdom	24 February 2017	22 August 2019	1 January 2021	see South Korea–United Kingdom Free Trade Agreement. never "negotiated" as prohibited by EU rules; aimed at maintaining the trade relations two countries enjoyed under EU-SK FTA before Brexit and subject to re-negotiation in two years
18	ASEAN member states, China, Japan, Australia and New Zealand	9 May 2013	15 November 2020	1 February 2022	see Regional Comprehensive Economic Partnership; from February 2022
19	Indonesia	7 July 2012	18 December 2020	1 January 2023	see Indonesia–Korea Comprehensive Economic Partnership Agreement
20	Israel	27 June 2016	12 May 2021	1 January 2023	South Korea's first FTA in Middle East and Israel's first in Asia
21	Philippines	4 June 2019	7 September 2023	31 December 2024	
22	Ecuador	26 January 2016	11 October 2023		SECA (Strategic Economic Cooperation Agreement) first negotiation commended in 2006 but stalled since; In February 2022 both parties agreed to complete negotiations in 2022
23	United Arab Emirates	October 2022	14 October 2023		UAE-Korea Comprehensive Economic Partnership Agreement
24	Gulf Cooperation Council (Bahrain, Kuwait, Oman, Qatar, Saudi Arabia, UAE)	9 July 2008	28 December 2023		First negotiation commenced in 2008 upon President Roh's visit to Riyadh but later halted by GCC in 2010; resumed negotiation in 2022 upon President Moon's visit to Riyadh
25	Central America + Guatemala	October 2021	9 January 2024		Participated as a new member of the Central America-South Korea Comprehensive Economic Partnership Agreement.

== Trade agreements signed yet in force ==
No.	State	Commenced negotiation	Officially Signed	Notes
1	Cambodia	30 July 2020	26 October 2021	
2	Singapore	29 July 2020	N/A	Digital Partnership Agreement on digital trade; concluded negotiations in 2021

== Trade agreements under negotiation ==
No.	State	Commenced negotiation	Notes
1	China, Japan	26 March 2013	see China–Japan–South Korea Free Trade Agreement
2	Mercosur* (Argentina,Brazil,Paraguay and Uruguay)	11 September 2018	without Venezuela who is suspended of Mercosur membership
3	Russia	21 June 2019	on service and investment
4	Malaysia	11 July 2019	
5	Uzbekistan	26 April 2021	STEP (Agreement for Sustainable Trade and Economic Partnership)
6	Chile, New Zealand, Singapore	2021	see Digital Economy Partnership Agreement
7	Pacific Alliance(Chile, Colombia, Mexico and Peru)	aims to begin in 2022	as an associate member of the block
8	Mexico	7 February 2006 aims to begin in 2022*	first negotiation commended in 2006 but halted in 2008
9	United Kingdom	21 November 2023	see South Korea–United Kingdom Free Trade Agreement

== Trade agreements of interest ==
No.	Current Members	Expressed interest	Notes
1	Chile, New Zealand and Singapore	2021	see DEPA (Digital Economy Partnership Agreement)
2	Australia, Brunei, Canada, Chile,Japan, Malaysia, Mexico, New Zealand, Peru, Singapore, United Kingdom, and Vietnam	2021	see CPTPP (Comprehensive and Progressive Agreement for Trans-Pacific Partnership)

== See also ==
- Foreign relations of South Korea
- Free trade agreements of India
- Free trade agreements of New Zealand
- Free trade agreements of the European Union
- Free trade agreements of the United Kingdom
- Free trade agreements of the United States
- Free trade agreements of Turkey
