= Jacinda Ardern =

Prime Minister of New Zealand from 2017 to 2023

The Right Honourable Dame Jacinda Ardern GNZM
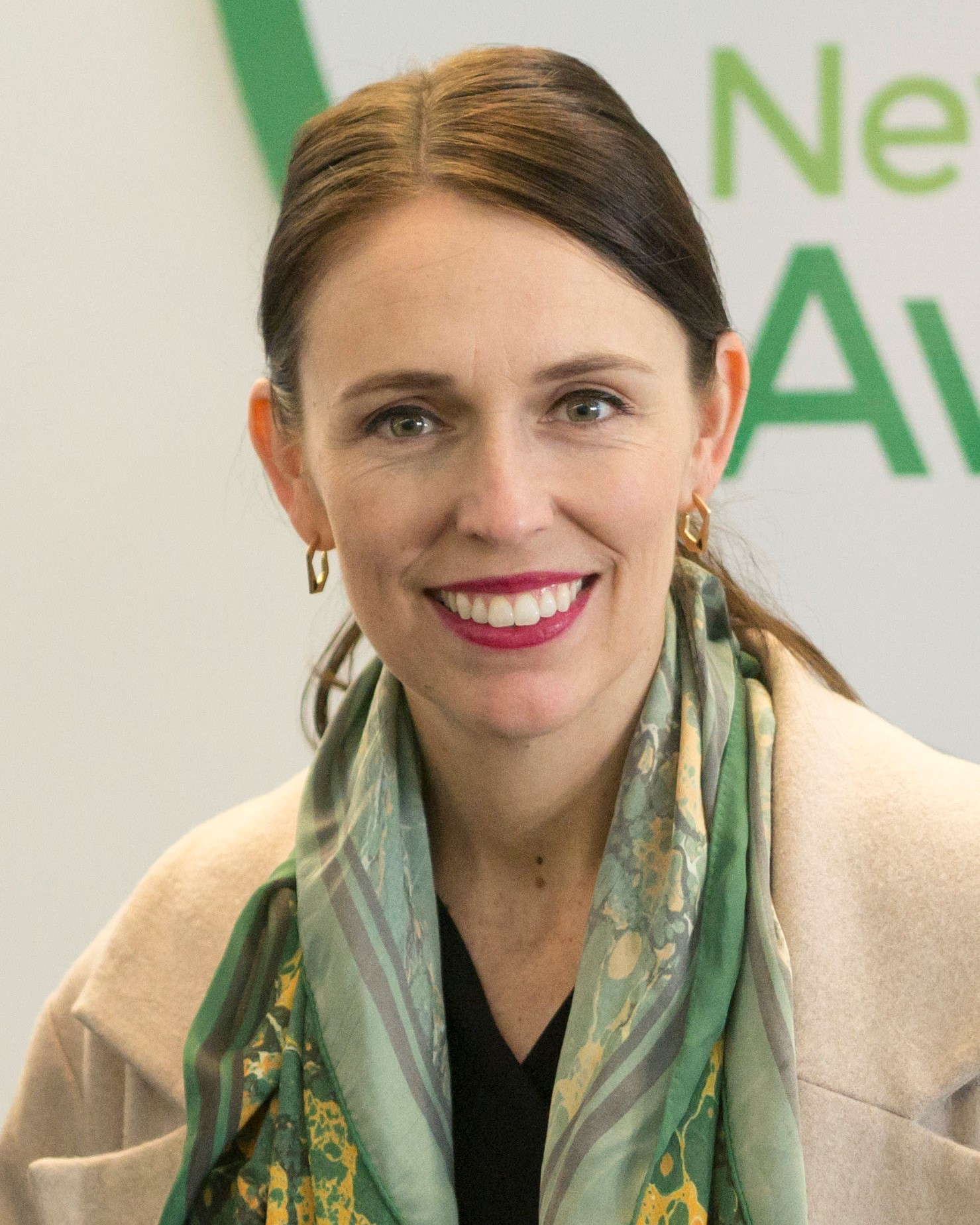
- Ardern in 2018

40th Prime Minister of New Zealand
- In office 26 October 2017 – 25 January 2023
- Monarchs: Elizabeth II; Charles III
- Governor-General: Patsy Reddy; Cindy Kiro
- Deputy: Winston Peters; Grant Robertson
- Preceded by: Bill English
- Succeeded by: Chris Hipkins

17th Leader of the Labour Party
- In office 1 August 2017 – 22 January 2023
- Deputy: Kelvin Davis
- Preceded by: Andrew Little
- Succeeded by: Chris Hipkins

36th Leader of the Opposition
- In office 1 August 2017 – 26 October 2017
- Deputy: Kelvin Davis
- Preceded by: Andrew Little
- Succeeded by: Bill English

17th Deputy Leader of the Labour Party
- In office 7 March 2017 – 1 August 2017
- Leader: Andrew Little
- Preceded by: Annette King
- Succeeded by: Kelvin Davis

Member of the New Zealand Parliament
- In office 8 November 2008 – 15 April 2023
- Succeeded by: Helen White
- Constituency: Party list (2008–2017); Mount Albert (2017–2023)

Personal details
- Born: Jacinda Kate Laurell Ardern; 26 July 1980 (age 46) Hamilton, New Zealand
- Party: Labour
- Spouse: Clarke Gayford (m. 2024)
- Children: 1
- Parent: Ross Ardern (father)
- Education: University of Waikato (BCS)

Dame Jacinda Kate Laurell Ardern (/ɑːrˈdɜːrn/ ah-DURN; born 26 July 1980) is a New Zealand activist and former politician who served as prime minister of New Zealand and leader of the Labour Party from 2017 to 2023. She was a member of Parliament (MP) as a list MP from 2008 to 2017 and for Mount Albert from 2017 to 2023.

Born and raised in Hamilton, Ardern grew up in Morrinsville and Murupara. She joined the New Zealand Labour Party at the age of 17. After graduating from the University of Waikato in 2001, Ardern worked as a researcher in the office of then-New Zealand Prime Minister Helen Clark. She later worked in London as an adviser in the Cabinet Office during Tony Blair's premiership. In 2008, Ardern was elected president of the International Union of Socialist Youth. Ardern was first elected as an MP in the 2008 general election, when Labour lost power after nine years. She was later elected to represent the Mount Albert electorate in a by-election on 25 February 2017.

Ardern was unanimously elected as deputy leader of the Labour Party on 1 March 2017, after the resignation of Annette King. Exactly five months later, with an election due, Labour's leader Andrew Little resigned after a historically low opinion polling result for the party, with Ardern elected unopposed as leader in his place. Labour's support increased rapidly after Ardern became leader, and she led her party to gain 14 seats at the 2017 general election on 23 September, winning 46 seats to the National Party's 56. After negotiations, New Zealand First chose to enter a minority coalition government with Labour, supported by the Green Party, with Ardern as prime minister. She was sworn in by the governor-general on 26 October 2017. She became the world's youngest female head of government at age 37. Ardern gave birth to her daughter on 21 June 2018, making her the world's second elected head of government to give birth while in office (after Benazir Bhutto).

Ardern describes herself as a social democrat and a progressive. The Sixth Labour Government faced challenges from the New Zealand housing crisis, child poverty, and social inequality. In March 2019, in the aftermath of the Christchurch mosque shootings, Ardern reacted by rapidly introducing strict gun laws. Throughout 2020 she led New Zealand's response to the COVID-19 pandemic, for which she won praise for New Zealand being one of few Western nations to successfully contain the virus. Ardern moved the Labour Party further to the centre towards the October 2020 general election, promising to cut spending during the remainder of the COVID-19 recession. She led the Labour Party to a landslide victory, gaining an overall majority of 65 seats in Parliament, the first time a majority government had been formed since 1996.

Facing declining popularity and increasing criticism over the government's handling of key issues such as the economy, housing, child poverty and the pandemic, Ardern announced on 19 January 2023, that she would resign as Labour leader, stating that she did not "have enough in the tank". Ardern resigned as leader of the Labour Party on 22 January and submitted her resignation as prime minister three days later. Rising costs of living and concerns that the government's focus on health measures overshadowed effective economic recovery fuelled public backlash against the Labour Party in the 2023 general election.

== Early life and education ==
Jacinda Kate Laurell Ardern was born on 26 July 1980 in Hamilton, in the North Island of New Zealand. She grew up in Morrinsville in Waikato, and then in Murupara in Bay of Plenty, where her father, Ross Ardern, worked as a police officer, and her mother, Laurell Ardern (née Bottomley), worked as a school catering assistant. She has an older sister named Louise. Ardern was raised in the Church of Jesus Christ of Latter-day Saints (LDS Church), and her uncle, Ian S. Ardern, is a general authority in the church. In 1994, she began studying at Morrinsville College, and later she was the student representative on the school's board of trustees. Whilst still at school, she found her first job, working at a local fish-and-chip shop.

She joined the Labour Party at the age of 17. Her aunt, Marie Ardern, a longstanding member of the Labour Party, recruited the teenaged Ardern to help her with campaigning for New Plymouth MP Harry Duynhoven during his re-election campaign at the 1999 general election.

Ardern attended the University of Waikato, graduating in 2001 as a Bachelor of Communication Studies in politics and public relations, a specialist three-year degree. She took a semester (half-year) abroad at Arizona State University in the United States in 2001. After graduating from university, she spent time working in the offices of Phil Goff and of Helen Clark as a researcher. After a period of time in New York City, United States, where she volunteered at a soup kitchen and worked on a workers' rights campaign, Ardern moved to London, England, in 2006, where she became a senior policy adviser in an 80-person policy unit of the United Kingdom Cabinet Office under prime minister Tony Blair. (She did not meet Blair in person while in London). Ardern was also seconded to the United Kingdom Home Office to help with a review of policing in England and Wales.

== Early political career ==
=== President of International Union of Socialist Youth ===
On 30 January 2008, at 27, Ardern was elected president of the International Union of Socialist Youth (IUSY) at their world congress in the Dominican Republic for a two-year term until 2010. The role saw her spend time in several countries, including Hungary, Jordan, Israel, Algeria and China. It was mid-way through her presidency term that Ardern became a list MP for the Labour Party. She then continued to manage both roles for the next 15 months.

=== Member of Parliament ===
New Zealand Parliament
Years	Term	Electorate	List	Party
2008–2011	49th	List	20	Labour
2011–2014	50th	List	13	Labour
2014–2017	51st	List	5	Labour
2017	51st	Mount Albert		Labour
2017–2020	52nd	Mount Albert	1	Labour
2020–2023	53rd	Mount Albert	1	Labour

Ahead of the 2008 election, Ardern was ranked 20th on Labour's party list. This was a very high placement for someone who was not already a sitting MP, and virtually assured her of a seat in Parliament. Accordingly, Ardern returned from London to campaign full-time. She also became Labour's candidate for the safe National electorate of Waikato. Ardern was unsuccessful in the electorate vote, but her high placement on Labour's party list allowed her to enter Parliament as a list MP. Upon election, she became the youngest sitting MP in Parliament, succeeding fellow Labour MP Darren Hughes, and remained the youngest MP until the election of Gareth Hughes on 11 February 2010.

Opposition leader Phil Goff promoted Ardern to the front bench, naming her Labour's spokesperson for Youth Affairs and as associate spokesperson for Justice (Youth Affairs).

She made regular appearances on TVNZ's Breakfast programme as part of the "Young Guns" feature, in which she appeared alongside National MP (and future National leader) Simon Bridges.

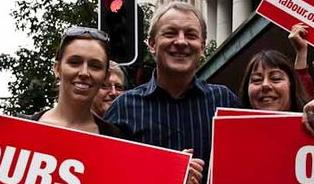
Ardern, with Phil Goff and Carol Beaumont, at an anti-mining march on 1 May 2010

Ardern contested the seat of Auckland Central for Labour in the 2011 general election, standing against incumbent National MP Nikki Kaye for National and Greens candidate Denise Roche. She lost to Kaye by 717 votes. However, she returned to Parliament via the party list, on which she was ranked 13th. Ardern maintained an office within the electorate while she was a list MP based in Auckland Central.

After Goff resigned from the Party leadership following his defeat at the 2011 election, Ardern supported David Shearer over David Cunliffe. She was elevated to the fourth-ranking position in his Shadow Cabinet on 19 December 2011, becoming a spokesperson for social development under the new leader.

Ardern stood again in Auckland Central at the 2014 general election. She again finished second though increased her own vote and reduced Kaye's majority from 717 to 600. Ranked 5th on Labour's list, Ardern was still returned to Parliament where she became Shadow spokesperson for Justice, Children, Small Business, and Arts & Culture under new leader Andrew Little.

In 2014 Ardern was also selected, attended and graduated from the World Economic Forum's (WEF) Forum of Young Global Leaders, founded by Klaus Schwab, which takes place in Switzerland. She remains involved publicly as a part of the Young Global Leaders Alumni Community, and speaks at WEF events.

== Pre-premiership ==
=== Mount Albert by-election ===
Ardern put forward her name for the Labour nomination for the Mount Albert by-election to be held in February 2017 following the resignation of David Shearer on 8 December 2016. When nominations for the Labour Party closed on 12 January 2017, Ardern was the only nominee and was selected unopposed. On 21 January, Ardern participated in the 2017 Women's March, a worldwide protest in opposition to Donald Trump, the newly inaugurated president of the United States. She was confirmed as Labour's candidate at a meeting on 22 January. Ardern won a landslide victory, gaining 77 per cent of votes cast in the preliminary results.

=== Deputy Leader of the Labour Party ===
Following her win in the by-election, Ardern was unanimously elected as deputy leader of the Labour Party on 7 March 2017, following the resignation of Annette King, who was intending to retire at the next election. Ardern's vacant list seat was taken by Raymond Huo.

=== Leader of the Opposition ===
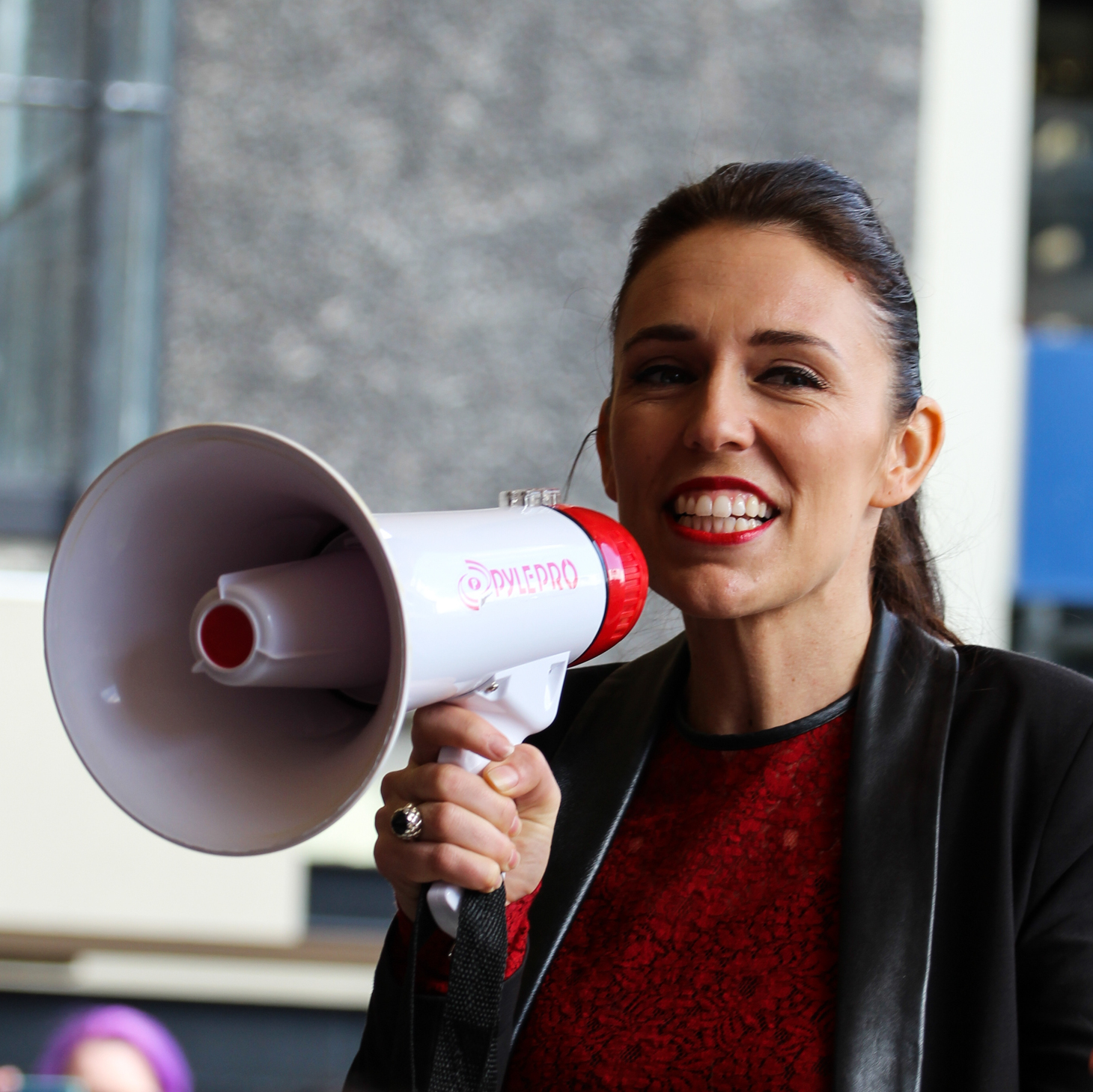
Ardern campaigning at the University of Auckland in September 2017

On 1 August 2017, just seven weeks before the 2017 general election, Ardern assumed the position of leader of the Labour Party, and consequently became leader of the Opposition, following the resignation of Andrew Little. Little stood down due to the party's historically low polling. Ardern was unanimously confirmed in an election to choose a new leader at a caucus meeting the same day. At 37, Ardern became the youngest leader of the Labour Party in its history. She is also the second female leader of the party after Helen Clark. According to Ardern, Little had previously approached her on 26 July and said he thought she should take over as Labour leader then, as he was of the opinion he could not turn things around for the party, although Ardern declined and told him to "stick it out".

At her first press conference, after her election as leader, she said that the forthcoming election campaign would be one of "relentless positivity". Immediately following her appointment, the party was inundated with donations by the public, reaching NZ$700 per minute at its peak. After Ardern's ascension to the leadership, Labour rose dramatically in opinion polls. By late August, the party had reached 43 per cent in the Colmar Brunton poll (having been 24 per cent under Little's leadership) as well as managing to overtake National in opinion polls for the first time in over a decade. Detractors observed her positions were substantially similar to those of Andrew Little, and suggested that Labour's sudden increase in popularity were due to her youth and good looks.

In mid-August, Ardern stated that a Labour government would establish a tax working group to explore the possibility of introducing a capital gains tax but ruled out taxing family homes. In response to negative publicity, Ardern abandoned plans to introduce a capital gains tax during the first term of a Labour government. Finance spokesperson Grant Robertson later clarified that Labour would not introduce new taxes until after the 2020 election. The policy shift accompanied strident allegations by Minister of Finance Steven Joyce that Labour had an $11.7 billion "hole" in its tax policy.

The Labour and Green parties' proposed water and pollution taxes also generated criticism from farmers. On 18 September 2017, the farming lobby group Federated Farmers staged a protest against the taxes in Ardern's hometown of Morrinsville. New Zealand First leader Winston Peters attended the protest to campaign but was jeered at by the farmers because they suspected he was also in favour of the taxes. During the protest, one farmer displayed a sign calling Ardern a "pretty communist". This was criticised as misogynistic by former prime minister Helen Clark.

In the final days of the general election campaign, the opinion polls narrowed with National taking a slight lead.

=== 2017 general election ===
At the general election held on 23 September 2017, Ardern retained her Mount Albert electorate seat by a margin of 15,264 votes. Labour increased its vote share to 36.89 per cent while National dropped back to 44.45. Labour gained 14 seats, increasing its parliamentary representation to 46 seats, the best result for the party since losing power in 2008.

The rival Labour and National parties lacked sufficient seats to govern alone and held talks with the Greens and New Zealand First parties about forming a coalition. Under the country's mixed-member proportional (MMP) voting system, New Zealand First held the balance of power and chose to be part of a coalition government with Labour.

== Prime Minister (2017–2023) ==
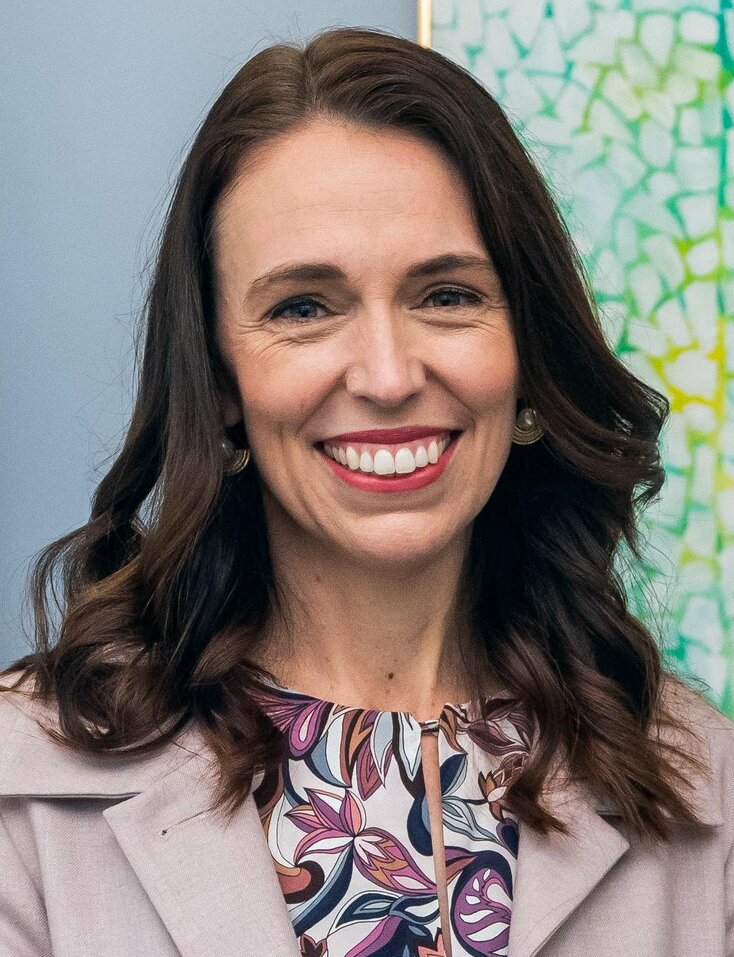
- Premiership of Jacinda Ardern; 26 October 2017 – 25 January 2023
- Monarchs: Elizabeth II; Charles III
- Cabinet: Sixth Labour Government of New Zealand
- Party: New Zealand Labour Party
- Election: 2017, 2020
- Appointed by: Patsy Reddy

=== First term (2017–2020) ===
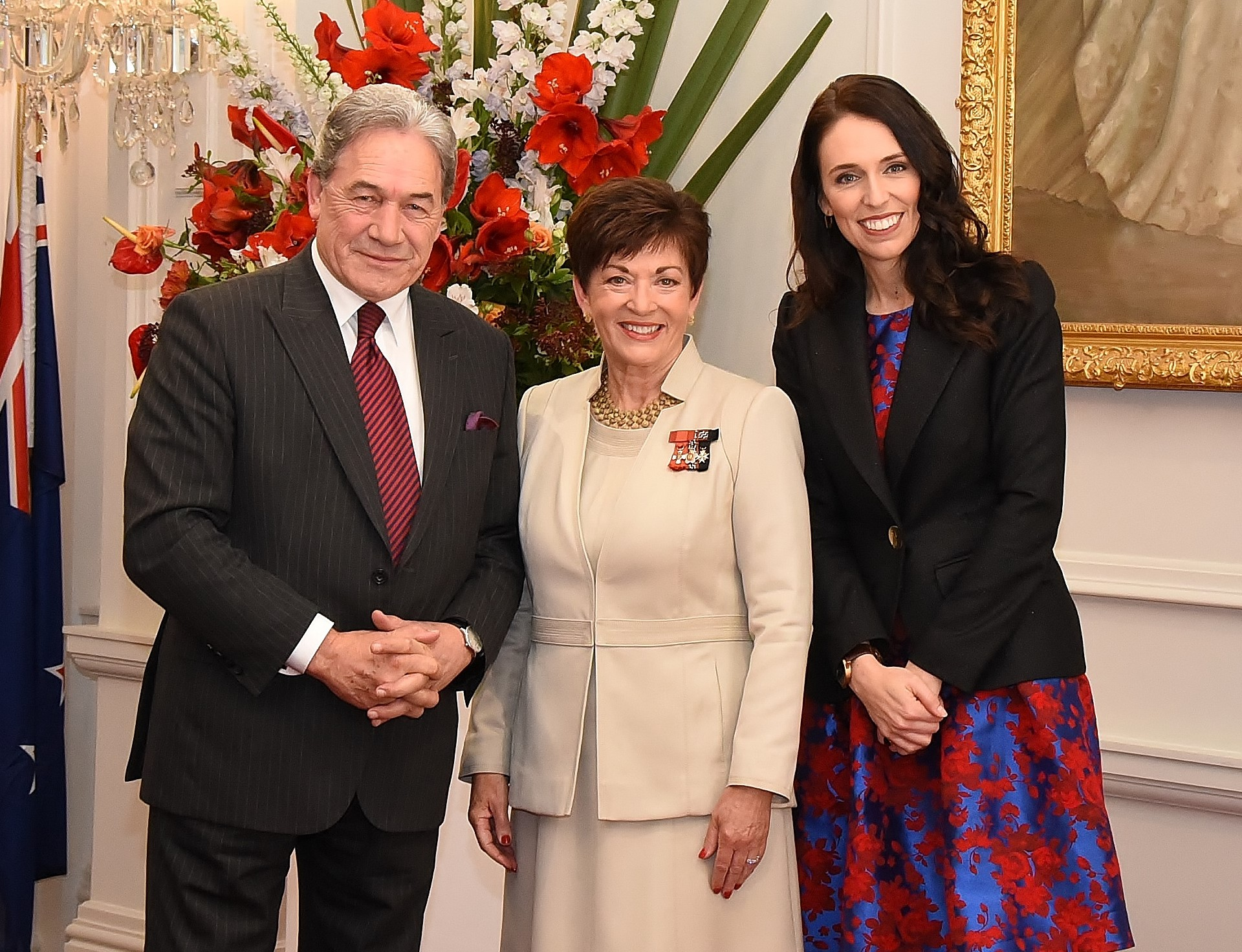
Ardern with then Deputy Prime Minister Winston Peters and Governor-General Dame Patsy Reddy at the swearing-in of the Cabinet on 26 October 2017

On 19 October 2017, New Zealand First leader Winston Peters agreed to form a coalition with Labour, making Ardern the next prime minister. This coalition received confidence and supply from the Green Party. Ardern named Peters as deputy prime minister and Minister of Foreign Affairs. She also gave New Zealand First five posts in her government, with Peters and three other ministers serving in Cabinet. The next day, Ardern indicated her intention to take ministerial responsibilities in the National Security and Intelligence; Arts, Culture and Heritage; and children's portfolios; reflecting the shadow positions she held as Leader of the Opposition. She wanted to appoint herself the Minister for Children but was advised that role was too large to hold alongside her other responsibilities; instead, Ardern became the first Minister for Child Poverty Reduction. She was officially sworn in by Governor-General Dame Patsy Reddy on 26 October, alongside her ministry. Upon taking office, Ardern said that her government would be "focused, empathetic and strong".

Ardern is New Zealand's third female prime minister after Jenny Shipley (1997–1999) and Helen Clark (1999–2008). She is a member of the Council of Women World Leaders. Entering office aged 37, Ardern is also the youngest individual to become New Zealand's head of government since Edward Stafford, who became premier in 1856 also aged 37. On 19 January 2018, Ardern announced that she was pregnant, and that Winston Peters would take the role of acting prime minister for six weeks after the birth. Following the birth of a daughter, she took her maternity leave from 21 June to 2 August 2018.

==== Domestic affairs ====
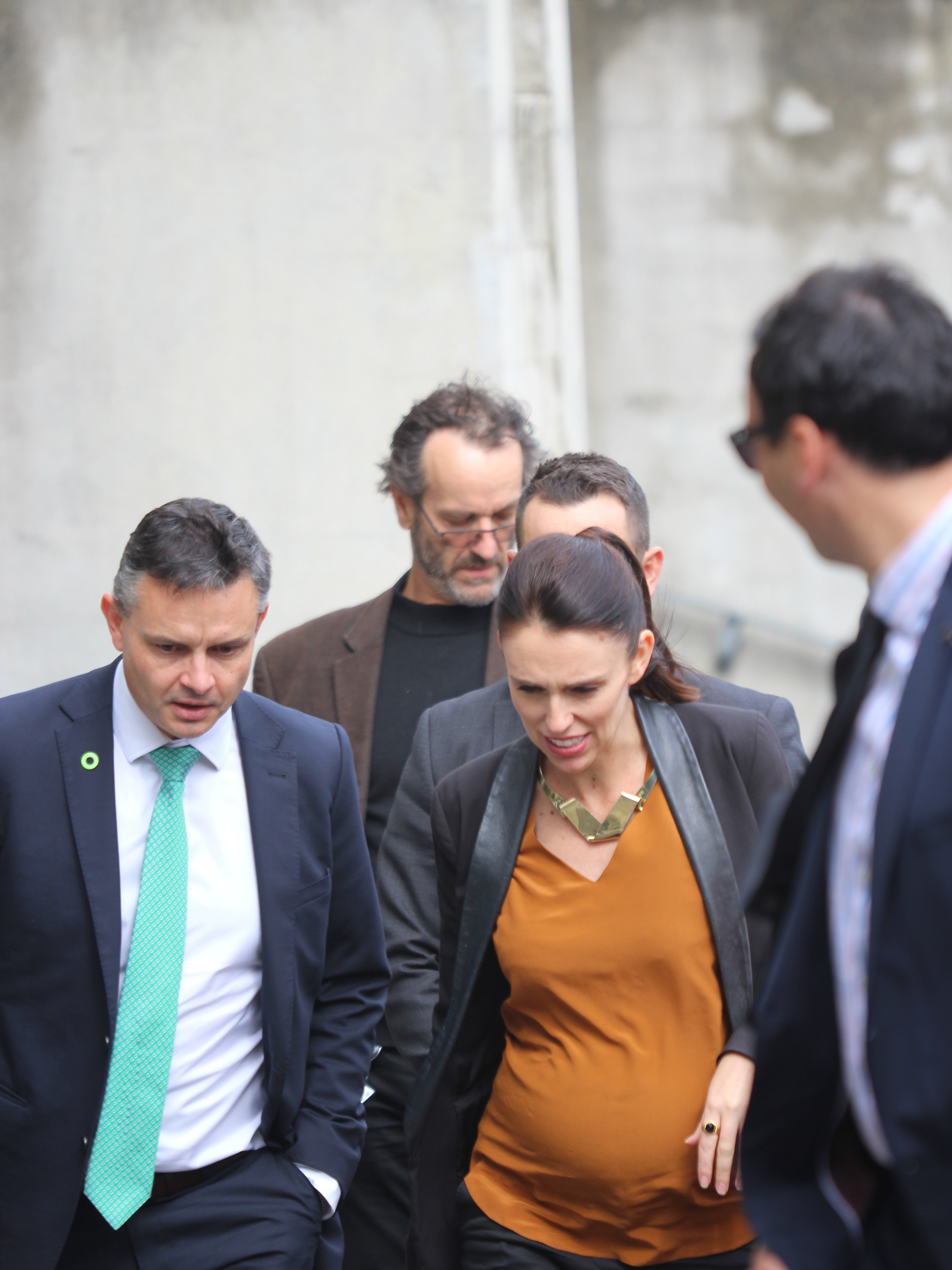
Ardern with Green Party co-leader James Shaw at Victoria University of Wellington, 12 April 2018

Ardern promised to halve child poverty in New Zealand within a decade. In July 2018, Ardern announced the start of her government's flagship Families Package. Among its provisions, the package gradually increased paid parental leave to 26 weeks and introduced a $60 per-week universal BestStart Payment for low and middle-income families with young children. The Family Tax Credit, Orphans Benefit, Accommodation Supplement, and Foster Care Allowance were all substantially increased as well. In 2019, the government began the roll-out of a school lunches pilot programme to assist in reducing child poverty numbers; this was then extended to support 200,000 children (about 25 per cent of school rolls) in low decile schools. Other efforts to reduce poverty have included increases to main welfare benefits, expanding free doctor's visits, providing free menstrual hygiene products in schools and adding to state housing stock.

However, as of 2022 critics say rising housing costs are continuing to cripple families and systemic changes are needed to ensure any gains are lasting.

Economically, Ardern's government implemented steady increases to the country's minimum wage and introduced the Provincial Growth Fund to invest in rural infrastructure projects. The National Party's planned tax cuts were cancelled, saying instead it would prioritise expenditure on healthcare and education. The first year of post-secondary education was made free from 1 January 2018 and, after industrial action, the government agreed to increase primary teachers' pay by 12.8 (for beginning teachers) and 18.5 per cent (for senior teachers without other responsibilities) by 2021.

Despite the Labour Party campaigning on a capital gains tax for the last three elections, Ardern pledged in April 2019 that the government would not implement a capital gains tax under her leadership. However, since then the period for which capital gain on rental properties sold is taxed has increased from five to ten years since purchase.

Ardern travelled to Waitangi in 2018 for the annual Waitangi Day commemoration; stayed in Waitangi for five days, an unprecedented length. Ardern became the first female prime minister to speak from the top marae. Her visit was largely well received by Māori leaders, with commentators noting a sharp contrast with the acrimonious responses received by several of her predecessors.

On 24 August 2018, Ardern removed Broadcasting Minister Clare Curran from Cabinet after she failed to disclose a meeting with a broadcaster outside of parliamentary business, which was judged to be a conflict of interest. Curran remained a minister outside Cabinet, and Ardern was criticised by the Opposition for not dismissing Curran from her portfolio. Ardern later accepted Curran's resignation. In 2019, she was criticised for her handling of an allegation of sexual assault against a Labour Party staffer. Ardern said she had been told the allegation did not involve sexual assault or violence before a report about the incident was published in The Spinoff. Media questioned her account, with one journalist stating that Ardern's claim was "hard to swallow".

Ardern opposes criminalising people who use cannabis in New Zealand, and pledged to hold a referendum on the issue. A non-binding referendum to legalise cannabis was held in conjunction with the 2020 general election on 17 October 2020. Ardern admitted to past cannabis use during a televised debate prior to the election. In the referendum, voters rejected the proposed Cannabis Legalisation and Control Bill by 51.17 per cent. A retrospective article published in a medical journal suggested that Ardern's refusal to publicly back the 'yes' campaign "may have been a decisive factor in the narrow defeat".

In September 2020, Ardern announced that her government had abandoned plans to make tertiary education tuition free.

==== Foreign affairs ====
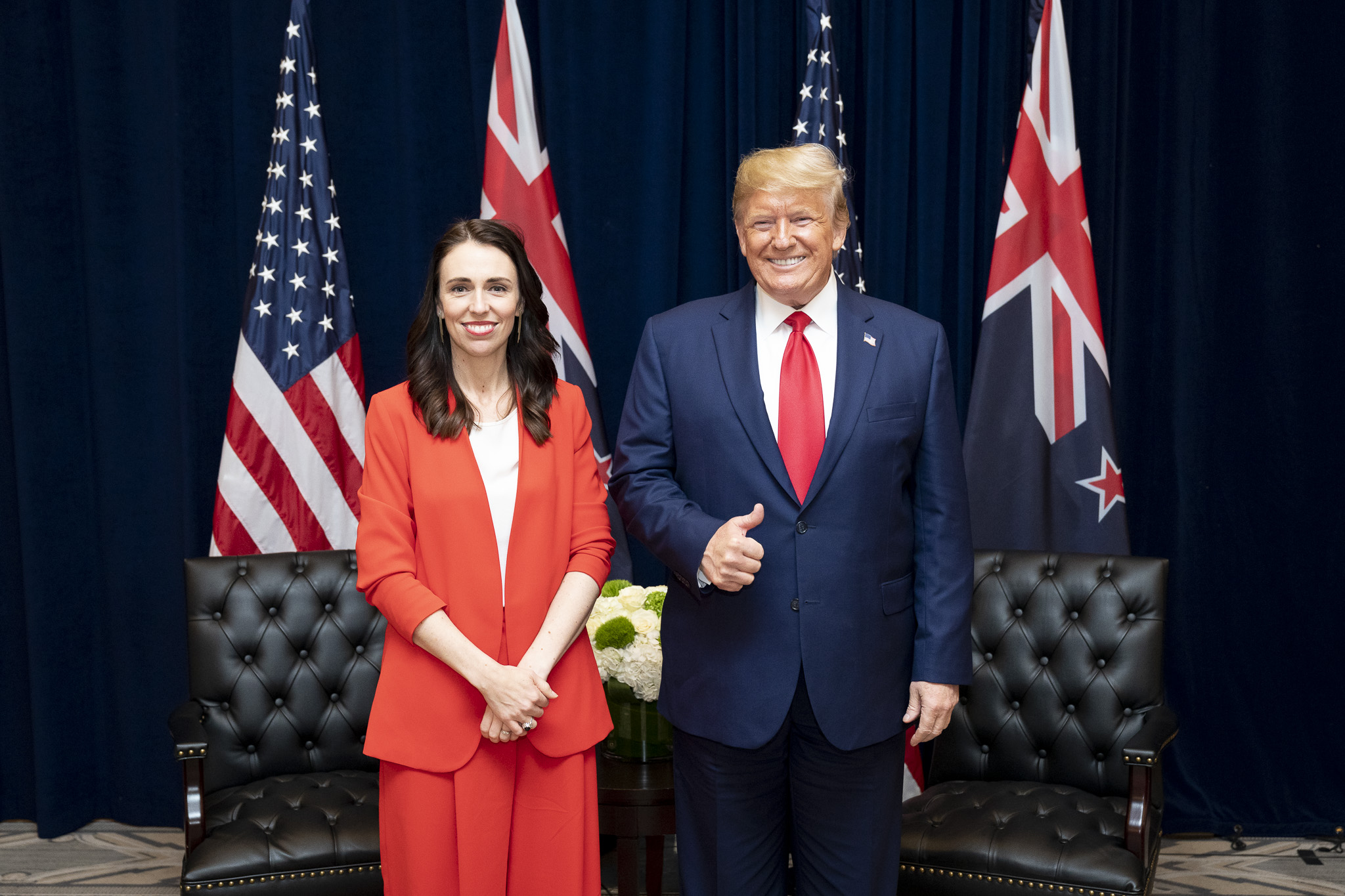
Ardern with US President Donald Trump, 23 September 2019

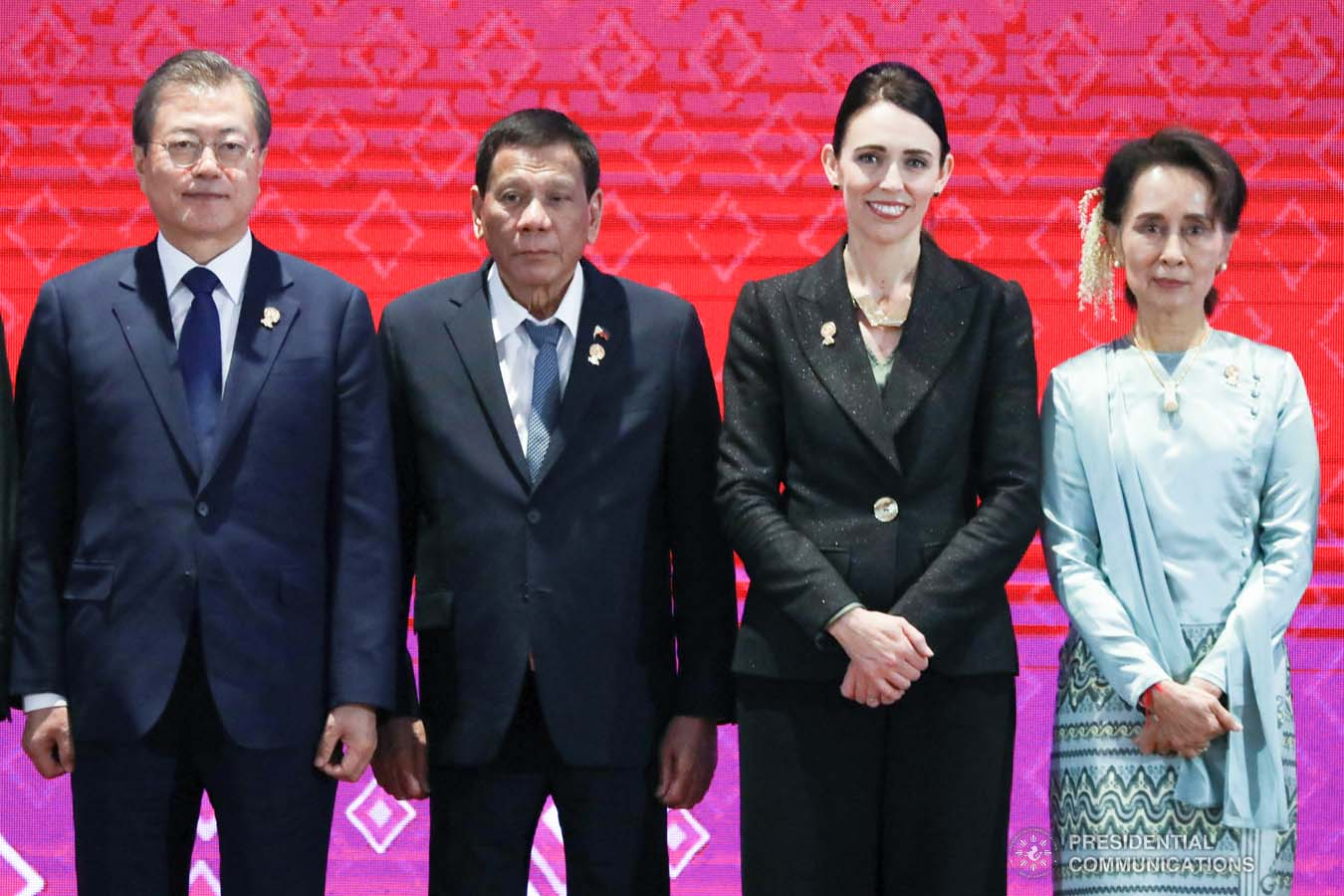
(L–R:) South Korean President Moon Jae-in, Philippine President Rodrigo Duterte, Ardern, and Myanmar State Counsellor Aung San Suu Kyi, at the 14th East Asia Summit in Thailand, 4 November 2019

On 5 November 2017, Ardern made her first official overseas trip to Australia, where she met Australian Prime Minister Malcolm Turnbull for the first time. Relations between the two countries had been strained in the preceding months because of Australia's treatment of New Zealanders living in the country, and shortly before taking office, Ardern had spoken of the need to rectify this situation, and to develop a better working relationship with the Australian government. Turnbull described the meeting in cordial terms: "we trust each other...The fact we are from different political traditions is irrelevant".

On 12 November 2017, Trade and Export Growth Minister David Parker and Ardern announced that the government would continue participating in the Trans-Pacific Partnership negotiations despite opposition from the Green Party. New Zealand ratified the revised agreement, the Comprehensive and Progressive Agreement for Trans-Pacific Partnership, which she described as being better than the original TPP agreement.

Ardern attended the 2017 APEC summit in Vietnam, the Commonwealth Heads of Government Meeting 2018 in London (featuring a private audience with Queen Elizabeth II) and a United Nations summit in New York City. After her first formal meeting with Donald Trump she reported that the US president showed "interest" in New Zealand's gun buyback programme. In 2018, Ardern raised the issue of Xinjiang re-education camps and human-rights abuses against the Uyghur Muslim minority in China. Ardern has also raised concerns over the persecution of the Rohingya Muslims in Myanmar.

Ardern travelled to Nauru, where she attended the 2018 Pacific Islands Forum. Media and political opponents criticised her decision to travel separately from the rest of her contingent, costing taxpayers up to NZ$100,000, so that she could spend more time with her daughter. At a 2018 United Nations General Assembly meeting, Ardern became the first female head of government to attend with her infant present. Her address to the General Assembly praised the United Nations for its multilateralism, expressed support for the world's youth, called for immediate attention to the effects and causes of climate change, for the equality of women, and for kindness as the basis for action.

On 24 September 2019, Ardern met with United States President Donald Trump on the sidelines of the annual United Nations General Assembly meeting. During the 25-minute meeting, the two leaders discussed various issues including tourism, the Christchurch mosque shooting, and bilateral trade. During the meeting, Trump expressed an interest in New Zealand's gun buy-back scheme. The two leaders had earlier met briefly at the 2017 East Asia Summit, the 2017 APEC Summit, and during an exclusive party following the 2018 UN General Assembly meeting.

In late February 2020, Ardern met Australian Prime Minister Scott Morrison in Sydney. During her visit, she criticised Australia's policy of deporting New Zealanders, many of whom had lived in Australia but had not taken up Australian citizenship, as "corrosive" and damaging to Australia–New Zealand relations.

==== Christchurch mosque shootings ====
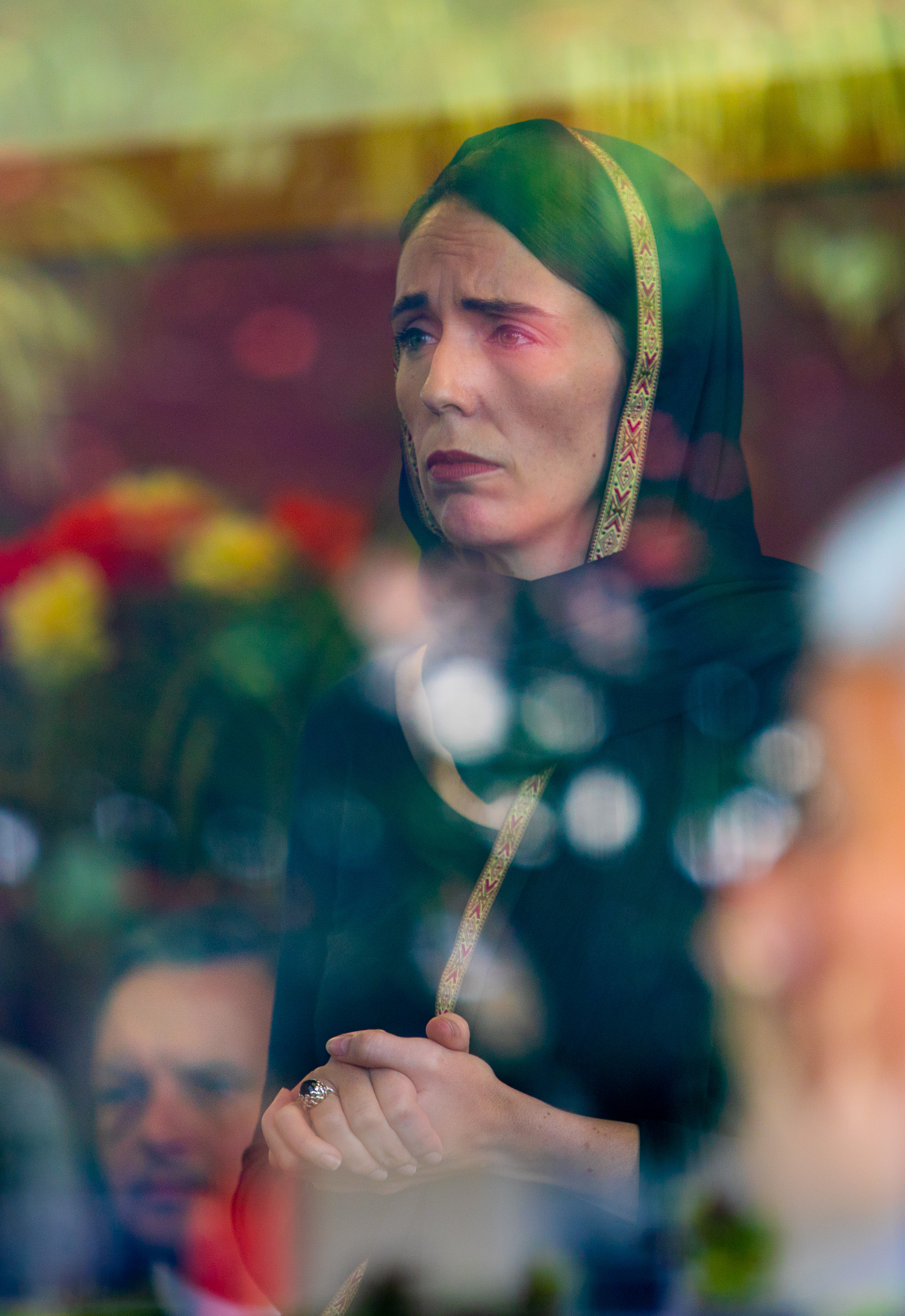
Ardern visited members of the Muslim community at the Phillipstown Community Centre, 16 March 2019. Captured through a glass window, this photograph was widely shared at the time and described by The Guardian as "an image of hope".

On 15 March 2019, 51 people were fatally shot and 49 injured in two mosques in Christchurch. In a statement broadcast on television, Ardern offered condolences and stated that the shootings had been carried out by suspects with "extremist views" that have no place in New Zealand, or anywhere else in the world. She also described it as a well-planned terrorist attack.

US President Donald Trump telephoned her asking if there was anything the US could do; Ardern described the killer as a terrorist, and asked Trump to "show sympathy and love for all Muslim communities ... the terrorist chose us because he knew that New Zealand openly welcomed people of all faiths. He wanted to destroy that."

Ardern announced a period of national mourning, and was the first signatory of a national condolence book that she opened in the capital, Wellington. She also travelled to Christchurch to meet first responders and families of the victims. In an address at the Parliament, she declared she would never say the name of the attacker: "Speak the names of those who were lost rather than the name of the man who took them... he will, when I speak, be nameless." Ardern received international praise for her response to the shootings, and a photograph of her hugging a member of the Christchurch Muslim community with the word "peace" in English and Arabic was projected onto the Burj Khalifa, the world's tallest building. A 25-metre (82 ft) mural of this photograph was unveiled in May 2019, in Melbourne, Australia.

In response to the shootings, Ardern announced her government's intention to introduce stronger firearms regulations. She said that the attack had exposed a range of weaknesses in New Zealand's gun law. Less than one month after the attack, the New Zealand Parliament passed a law that bans most semiautomatic weapons and assault rifles, parts that convert guns into semiautomatic guns, and higher capacity magazines. Ardern and French President Emmanuel Macron co-chaired the 2019 Christchurch Call summit, which aimed to "bring together countries and tech companies in an attempt to bring to an end the ability to use social media to organise and promote terrorism and violent extremism". In 2025, 130 governments and tech firms were signed up to the "Christchurch Call to Action".

==== COVID-19 pandemic ====
On 14 March 2020, Ardern announced in response to the COVID-19 pandemic in New Zealand that the government would be requiring anyone entering the country from midnight 15 March to isolate themselves for 14 days. She said the new rules would give New Zealand the "widest-ranging and toughest border restrictions of any country in the world". On 19 March, Ardern closed New Zealand's borders to all except citizens and permanent residents from 21 March (NZDT). Ardern announced that New Zealand would move to alert level 4, including a nationwide lockdown, on 26 March.

National and international media covered the government response led by Ardern, praising her leadership and swift response to the outbreak in New Zealand. The Washington Post's Anna Fifield described her regular use of interviews, press conferences and social media as a "masterclass in crisis communication". Alastair Campbell, a journalist and adviser in Tony Blair's British government, commended Ardern for addressing both the human and economic consequences of the coronavirus pandemic.

In mid-April 2020 a lawsuit was filed, but dismissed, against Ardern and government officials, claiming that the COVID-19 lockdown infringed on the applicants' freedoms and was made for "political gain".

On 5 May 2020, Ardern, her Australian counterpart Scott Morrison and several Australian state and territorial leaders agreed that they would collaborate to develop a trans-Tasman COVID-safe travel zone that would allow residents from both countries to travel freely without travel restrictions as part of efforts to ease coronavirus restrictions.

Post-lockdown opinion polls showed the Labour Party with nearly 60 per cent support. In May 2020, Ardern rated 59.5 per cent as 'preferred prime minister' in a Newshub-Reid Research poll—the highest score for any leader in the Reid Research poll's history. The number of lives saved by the response Ardern spearheaded was estimated as up to 80,000 by a team led by Shaun Hendy.

=== Second term (2020–2023) ===
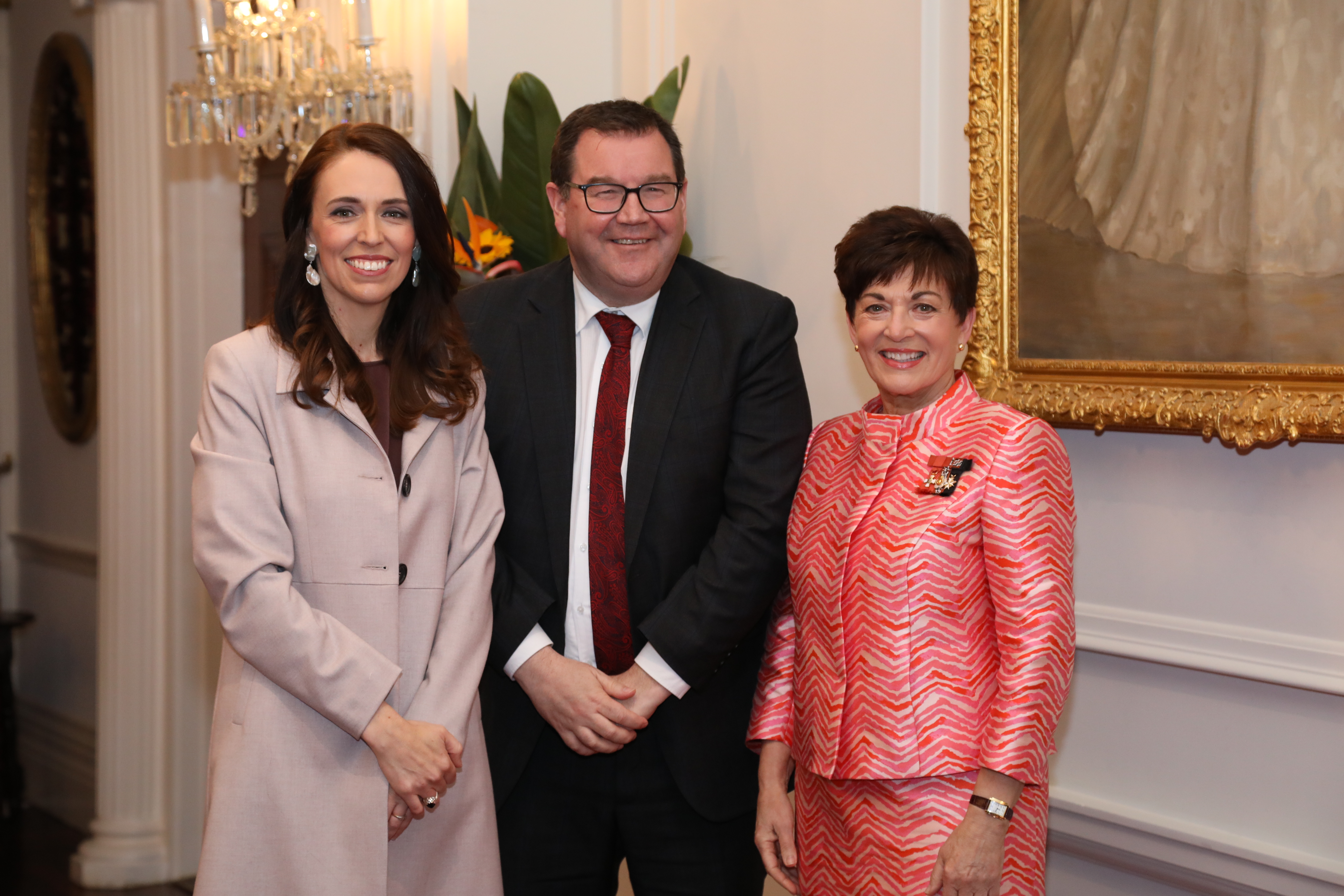
Ardern with Deputy Prime Minister Grant Robertson and Governor-General Dame Patsy Reddy at the swearing-in of the Cabinet on 6 November 2020

In the 2020 general election, Ardern led her party to a landslide victory, winning an overall majority of 65 seats in the 120-seat House of Representatives, and 50 per cent of the nationwide party vote (moreover Labour won the party vote in 71 out of the 72 electorates). She also retained the Mount Albert electorate by a margin of 21,246 votes. Ardern credited her victory to her government's response to the COVID-19 pandemic and the economic impacts it has had.

In 2021 the much more infectious Delta variant of COVID was spreading in New Zealand; in August a nationwide lockdown was instituted, but cases continued to rise, and the government abandoned containment and accelerated vaccination. Ardern said that she began to see that "New Zealand's sense of togetherness was starting to fracture". Anti-vaccine protesters demonstrated vociferously against Ardern. However, Ardern in 2025 continued to believe that she had saved about 24,000 lives by her actions, but said that she had found COVID "really hard".

In 2022, domestic popularity for Ardern and her policies fell considerably, with polling on whether people "think the country is going in the right direction" tracking down from a high of 70% in early 2021 to 30% at the end of 2022. The last polls of 2022 had Labour at about 33%, similar to party polling when she first took over in 2017, and her approval rating dropped to 29%.

==== Domestic affairs ====
On 2 December 2020, Ardern declared a climate change emergency in New Zealand and pledged that the Government would be carbon neutral by 2025 in a parliamentary motion. As part of this commitment towards carbon neutrality, the public sector would be required to buy only electric or hybrid vehicles, the fleet would be reduced over time by 20 per cent, and all 200 coal-fired boilers in public service buildings would be phased out. This motion was supported by the Labour, Green, and Māori parties, but was opposed by the opposition National and ACT parties. However, climate activist Greta Thunberg said about Ardern: "It's funny that people believe Jacinda Ardern and people like that are climate leaders. That just tells you how little people know about the climate crisis ... the emissions haven't fallen."

In response to worsening housing affordability issues, minister of housing and urban development Megan Woods announced new reforms. These reforms included the removal of the interest rate tax-deduction, lifting Housing Aid for first home buyers, renewed allocation of infrastructure funds (named Housing Acceleration Fund) for district councils, and an extension of the Bright Line Test from five to ten years.

New Zealand's net migration for the year ending March 2020 was a record 91,900 people.

On 14 June 2021, Ardern confirmed that the New Zealand government would formally apologise for the Dawn Raids, a series of police raids which disproportionately targeted members of the Pasifika diaspora in New Zealand during the 1970s and early 1980s, at the Auckland Town Hall on 26 June 2021.

In September 2022, Ardern led the nation's tributes following the death of New Zealand's longest-reigning monarch, Queen Elizabeth II. Ardern described her as an "incredible woman", a "constant in our lives", and a "much admired and respected" monarch. Ardern also stated that republicanism was currently not on the agenda but believed that the country would head in that direction in the future.

In mid-December 2022, Ardern was recorded on a hot mic calling the leader of the ACT Party, David Seymour, an "arrogant prick" during Parliament's Question Time which was broadcast on television. Ardern later texted Seymour to apologise for her comment. The two politicians subsequently reconciled and joined forces to raise NZ$60,000 for the Prostate Cancer Foundation by auctioning a signed and framed copy of the prime minister's remark.

==== COVID-19 and vaccination programme ====
On 17 June 2020, prime minister Ardern met with Bill and Melinda Gates via a teleconference in a meeting requested by Bill. In the meeting, Ardern was asked by Melinda to "speak up" in support of a collective approach to a COVID-19 vaccine. Ardern said she would be happy to assist, an Official Information Act request response has shown. A month earlier in May, Ardern's government had pledged $37 million to help develop a COVID-19 vaccine, which included $15 million to CEPI (Coalition for Epidemic Preparedness Innovations) founded by the Bill & Melinda Gates Foundation and the World Economic Forum among others, and $7 million to GAVI (Global Alliance for Vaccines and Immunisation), also founded by the Bill & Melinda Gates Foundation. During the meeting Gates noted this contribution.

On 12 December 2020, Ardern and Cook Islands prime minister Mark Brown announced that a travel bubble between New Zealand and the Cook Islands would be established in 2021, allowing two-way quarantine-free travel between the two countries. On 14 December, Prime Minister Ardern confirmed that the New Zealand and Australian governments had agreed to establish a travel bubble between the two countries the following year. On 17 December, Ardern also announced that the government had purchased two more vaccines from the pharmaceutical companies AstraZeneca and Novavax for New Zealand and its Pacific partners in addition to the existing stocks from Pfizer/BioNTech and Janssen Pharmaceutica.

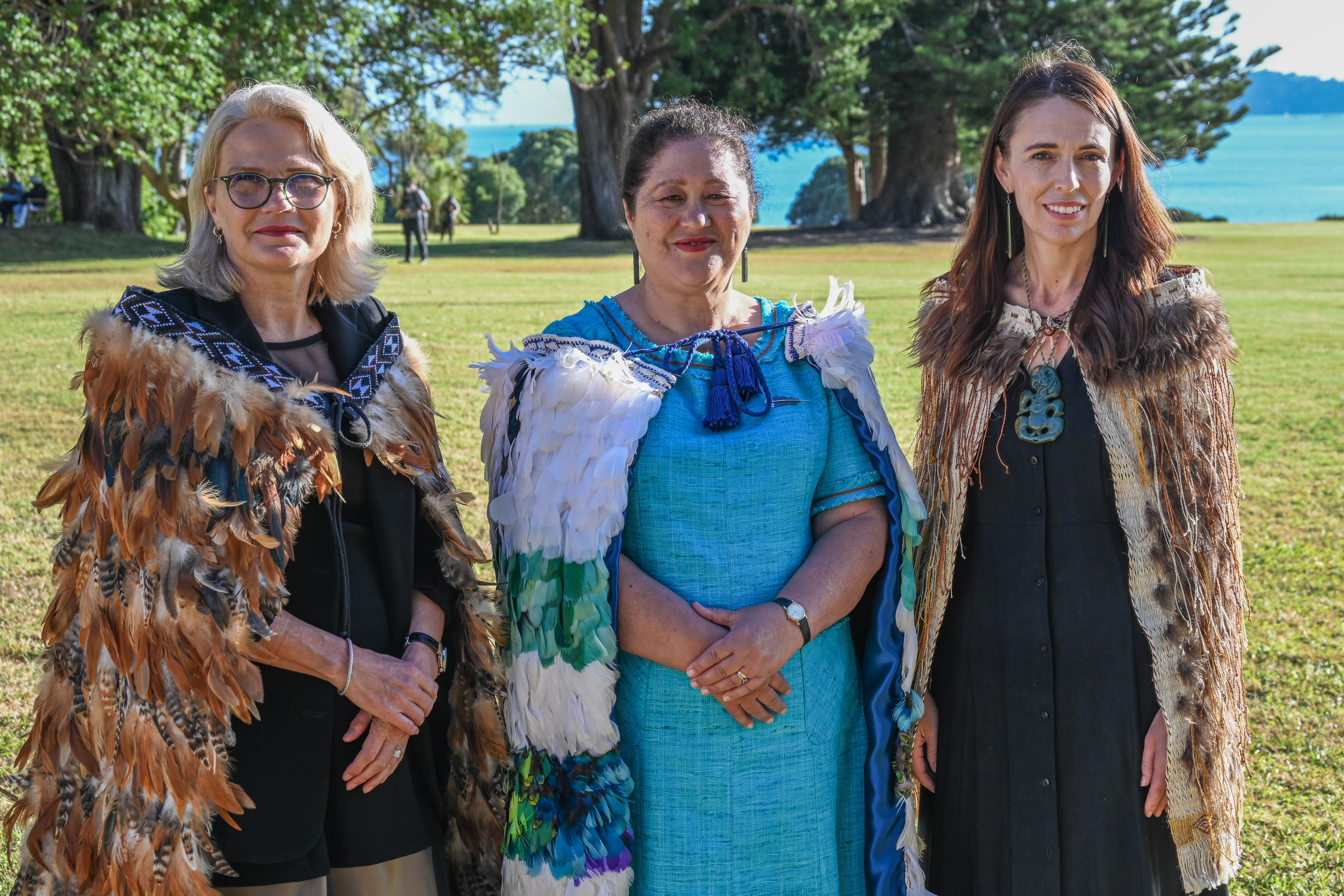
Ardern (right), with the Governor-General, Dame Cindy Kiro (centre), and the Chief Justice, Dame Helen Winkelmann, at Waitangi on 22 January 2022

On 26 January 2021, Ardern stated that New Zealand's borders would remain closed to most non-citizens and non-residents until New Zealand citizens have been "vaccinated and protected". The COVID-19 vaccination programme began in February 2021.

In the outbreak of the COVID-19 Delta variant in August 2021, she prompted the government to enact a nationwide lockdown again. By September, the number of new community infections began to fall again; comparisons were made with an outbreak in neighbouring Australia, which was unable to contain a Delta variant outbreak at the same time.

In early October 2021, after one and a half years of pursuing a "Covid zero" strategy—a policy maintained even as many of its neighbours transitioned to living with the viral threat—New Zealand finally ended its zero-Covid approach, becoming the last country in the world to do so, apart from China.

On 29 January 2022, Ardern, Governor-General Cindy Kiro and chief press secretary Andrew Campbell self-isolated after being in close contact with a COVID-19 case on an Air New Zealand flight on 22 January.

During a routine school visit by Ardern, vociferous protestors gathered; Ardern was driven away, chased by protesters. The previous month Ardern's vehicle had been chased by anti-vaccination protesters calling her a Nazi and yelling obscenities; Ardern said it had been "just another day".

Ardern's government faced significant criticism for its border management during the COVID-19 pandemic, particularly the Managed Isolation and Quarantine (MIQ) system. Thousands of New Zealanders were stranded abroad sometimes for years due to the system's limited capacity. Critics highlighted the severe consequences, including homelessness, financial ruin, family separation, and mental health crises. In April 2022, the New Zealand High Court ruled that aspects of MIQ violated international human rights, finding the policies arbitrarily restricted citizens' right to return home under the International Covenant on Civil and Political Rights. During a May 2022 appearance on The Late Show with Stephen Colbert, Ardern stated that during the two and a half years New Zealand had closed its borders, "New Zealanders could come and go and use quarantine," a remark widely criticised as tone-deaf and dismissive of the hardships many thousands endured. While the policies were credited with limiting the virus's spread, their social and personal costs remain a controversial aspect of Ardern's pandemic leadership.

==== Foreign affairs ====
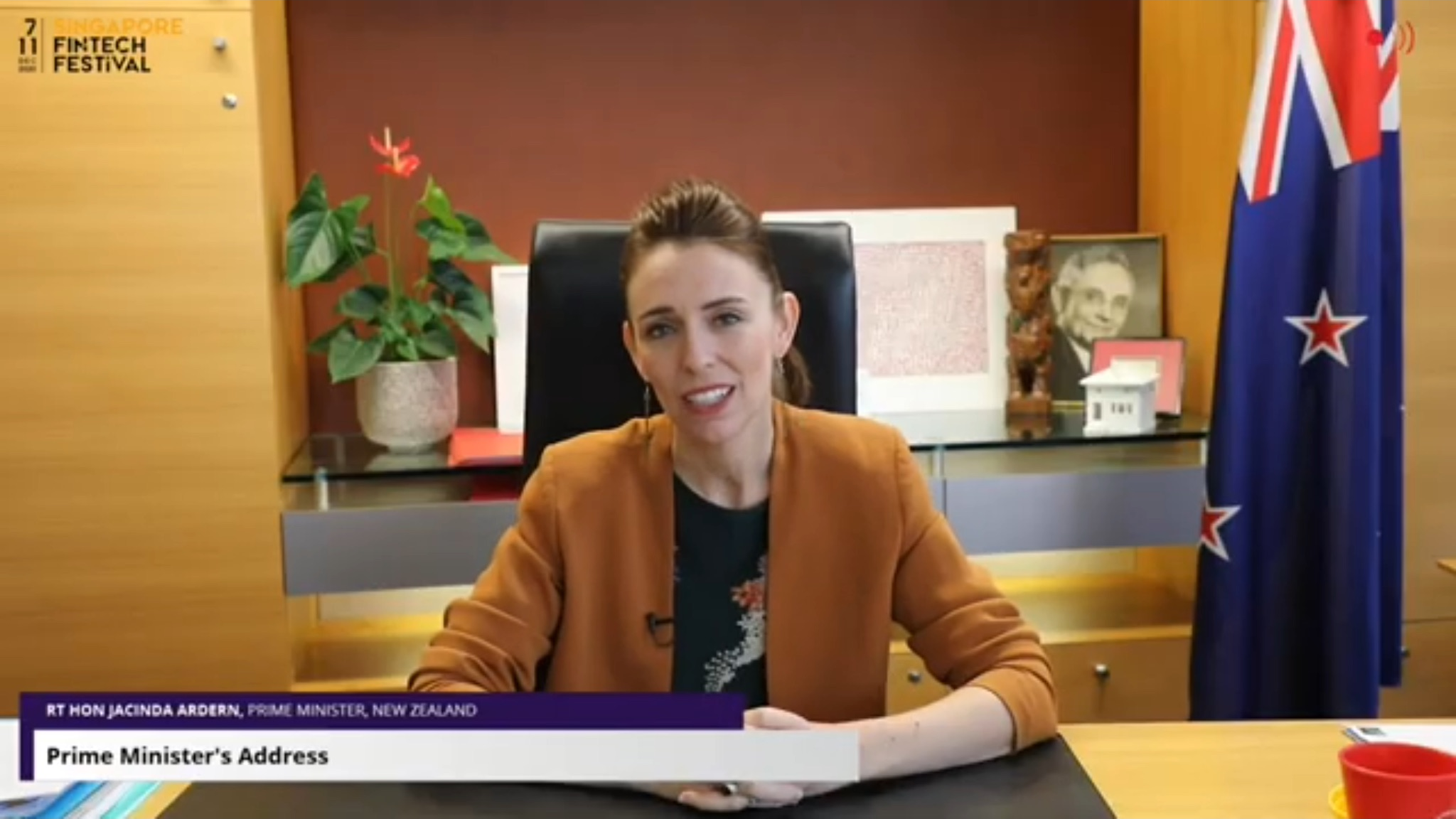
Ardern delivers a speech virtually at the Singapore FinTech Festival 2020.

In early December 2020, Ardern expressed support for Australia during a dispute between Canberra and Beijing over Chinese Foreign Ministry official Zhao Lijian's Twitter post alleging that Australia had committed war crimes against Afghans. She described the image as not being factual and incorrect, adding that the New Zealand Government would raise its concerns with the Chinese Government.

On 9 December 2020, Ardern delivered a speech virtually at the Singapore FinTech Festival, applauding the Digital Economy Partnership Agreement (DEPA) among New Zealand, Chile and Singapore as "the first important steps" to achieve the regulatory alignment to facilitate businesses.

On 16 February 2021, Ardern criticised the Australian Government's decision to revoke dual New Zealand–Australian national Suhayra Aden's Australian citizenship. Aden had migrated from New Zealand to Australia at the age of six and acquired Australian citizenship. She subsequently travelled to Syria to live in the Islamic State as a ISIS bride in 2014. On 15 February 2021, Aden and two of her children were detained by Turkish authorities for illegal entry. Ardern accused the Australian Government of abandoning its obligations to its citizens and also offered consular support to Aden and her children. In response, Australian Prime Minister Scott Morrison defended the decision to revoke Aden's citizenship, citing legislation stripping dual nationals of their Australian citizenship if they were engaged in terrorist activities. Following a phone conversation, the two leaders agreed to work together to address what Ardern described as "quite a complex legal situation".

In response to the 2021 Israel–Palestine crisis, Ardern stated on 17 May that New Zealand "condemned both the indiscriminate rocket fire we have seen from Hamas and what looks to be a response that has gone well beyond self-defence on both sides." She also stated that Israel had the "right to exist" but Palestinians also had a "right to a peaceful home, a secure home."

In late May 2021, Ardern hosted Australian Prime Minister Scott Morrison during a state visit at Queenstown. The two heads of governments issued a joint statement affirming bilateral cooperation on the issues of COVID-19, bilateral relations, and security issues in the Indo-Pacific. Ardern and Morrison also raised concerns about the South China Sea dispute and human rights in Hong Kong and Xinjiang. In response to the joint statement, Chinese Foreign Ministry spokesperson Wang Wenbin criticised the Australian and New Zealand governments for interfering in Chinese domestic affairs.

In early December 2021, Ardern participated in the virtual Summit for Democracy that was hosted by US President Joe Biden. In her address, she talked about bolstering democratic resilience in the age of COVID-19 followed by panel discussions. Ardern also announced that New Zealand would contribute an additional NZ$1 million to supporting Pacific countries' anti-corruption efforts, as well as contributing to UNESCO's Global Media Defence Fund and the International Fund for Public Interest Media.

In April 2022, Ardern was banned from entering Russia along with 129 other parliamentarians and senior government officials after the New Zealand Parliament unanimously imposed sanctions on Russia in response to its invasion of Ukraine.

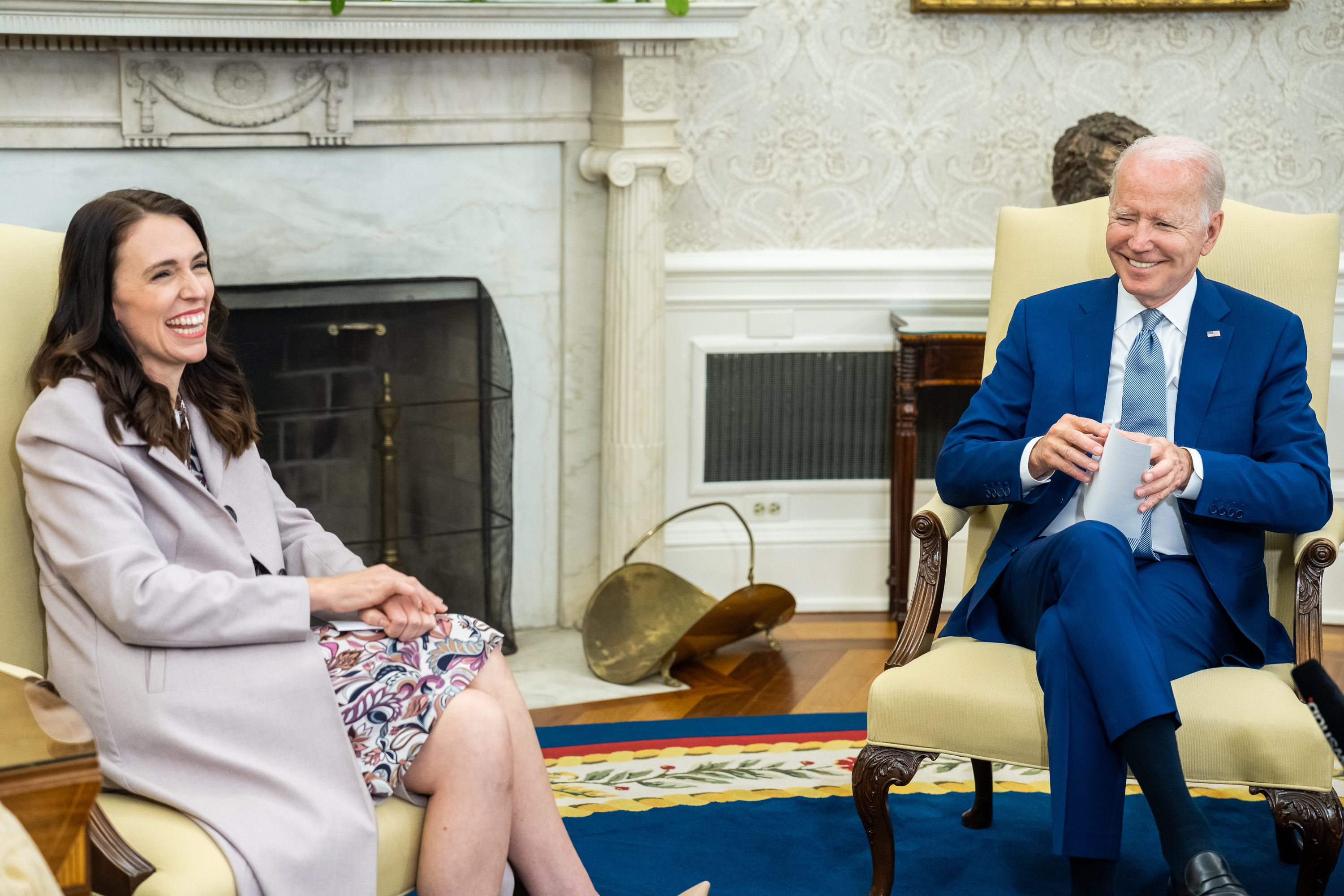
Ardern meets with US President Joe Biden in the Oval Office on 31 May 2022.

In late May 2022, Ardern led a trade and tourism mission to the United States. During her trip, she urged the Biden Administration to join the Comprehensive and Progressive Agreement for Trans-Pacific Partnership (CPTPP); the successor to the Trans-Pacific Partnership Agreement which the previous Trump Administration had abandoned in 2017. While attending the Late Show with Stephen Colbert, Ardern also condemned the Robb Elementary School shooting and advocated stronger gun control measures, citing New Zealand's ban on semi-automatic firearms following the 2019 Christchurch mosque shootings. On 27 May, Ardern gave the annual commencement address at Harvard University, speaking about gun reform and democracy. She was also awarded an honorary doctorate in law. On 28 May, Ardern signed a memorandum of understanding with Governor of California Gavin Newsom formalising bilateral cooperation between New Zealand and California in climate change mitigation and research.

On 1 June 2022, Ardern met with US President Joe Biden and Vice-president Kamala Harris to reaffirm bilateral relations between the two countries. The two leaders also issued a joint statement reaffirming bilateral cooperation on various issues including the South China Sea dispute, support for Ukraine in response to the Russian invasion, Chinese tensions with Taiwan, and alleged human-rights violations in Xinjiang and Hong Kong. In response, Chinese Foreign Ministry official Zhao Lijian accused New Zealand and the United States of seeking to spread disinformation about China's engagement with Pacific Islands countries, interfering in Chinese internal affairs, and urged New Zealand to adhere to its stated "independent foreign policy".

On 10 June 2022, Ardern visited the newly elected Australian Prime Minister Anthony Albanese. The two leaders discussed a range of issues including Australia's controversial Section 501 deportation policy, Chinese influence in the Pacific region, climate change, and working with Pacific neighbours. In response to Ardern's concerns, Albanese stated that he would explore ways of addressing New Zealand's concerns about the adverse impact of its deportation policies on New Zealanders residing in Australia.

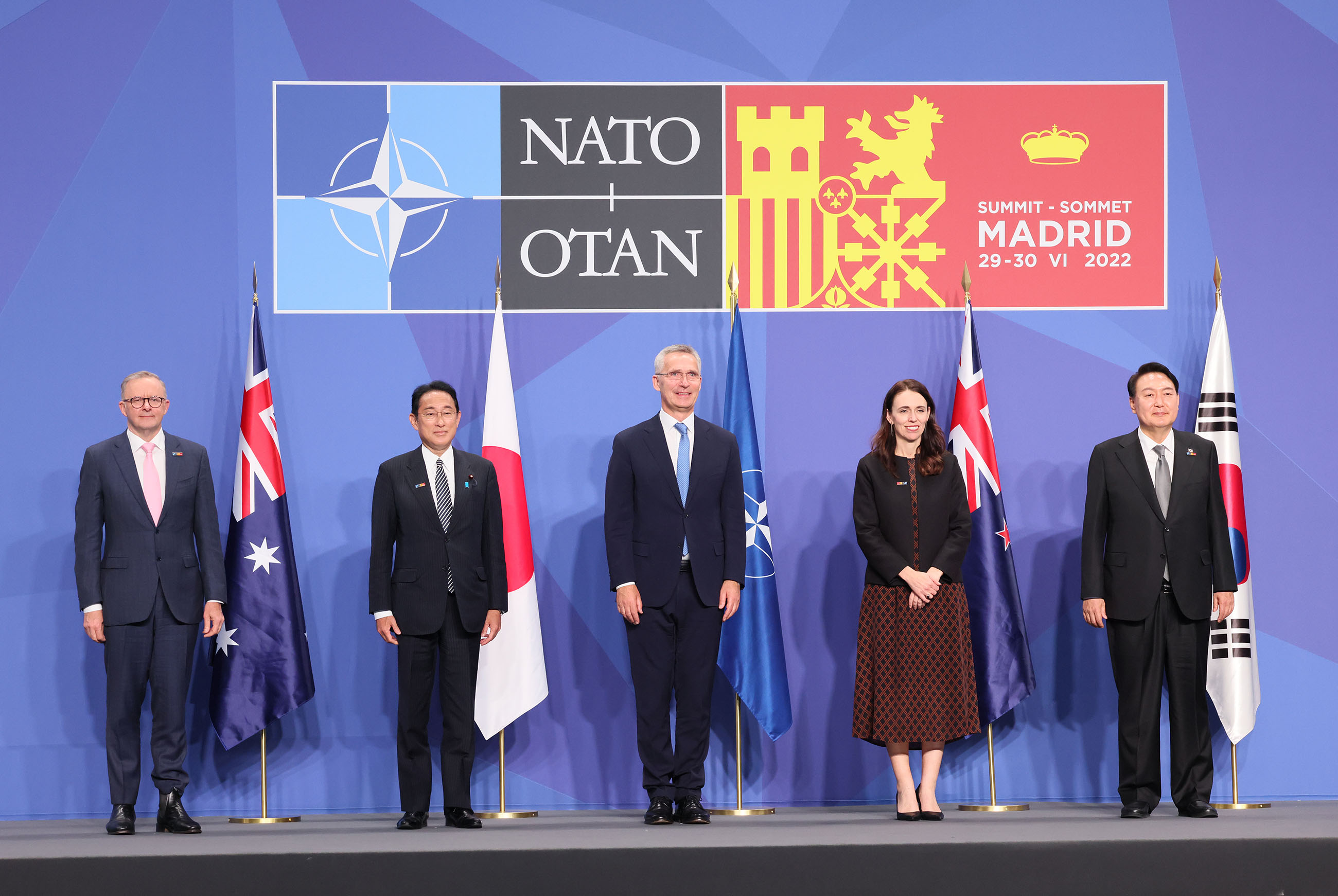
(L–R:) Australian Prime Minister Anthony Albanese, Japanese Prime Minister Fumio Kishida, NATO Secretary General Jens Stoltenberg, Ardern, and South Korean President Yoon Suk-yeol at the Madrid NATO summit, 29 June 2022

In late June 2022, Ardern attended the NATO's Leader Summit, which marked the first time that New Zealand had formally addressed a NATO event. During her speech, she emphasised New Zealand's commitment to peace and human rights. Ardern also criticised China for challenging international norms and rules in the South Pacific. She also alleged that Russia was conducting a disinformation campaign targeting New Zealand due to its support for Ukraine. In response, the Chinese Embassy defended China's engagement with the South Pacific region, claiming that China was only interested in promoting regional development and did not seek to militarise the region.

On 30 June 2022, Ardern spoke by telephone with Ukrainian president Volodymyr Zelenskyy. Though Zelenskyy had earlier invited Ardern to visit Ukraine during her European trade mission, Ardern had declined due to scheduling issues. During the conversation, Ardern reassured Zelenskyy that New Zealand would continue imposing sanctions on Russia. Zelenskyy also thanked New Zealand for providing aid to Ukraine and called for assistance in rebuilding Ukraine.

In early August 2022, Ardern led a delegation of New Zealand political leaders, officials, civil society leaders, and journalists including National Party and opposition leader Christopher Luxon, Arts, Culture and Heritage Minister Carmel Sepuloni and Pacific Peoples Minister William Sio on a state visit to Samoa to marked the 60th anniversary of Samoa's independence. This visit preceded an earlier visit to New Zealand in June 2022 by Samoan Prime Minister Fiame Naomi Mata'afa. On 2 August, Ardern met with Fiame to discuss issues of concern to bilateral relations including climate change, economic resilience, COVID-19, health and Samoan seasonal workers in New Zealand. Ardern also confirmed that New Zealand would commit NZ$15 million in aid to support Samoa's climate change mitigation efforts and NZ$12m to rebuild Apia's historical Savalalo Market.

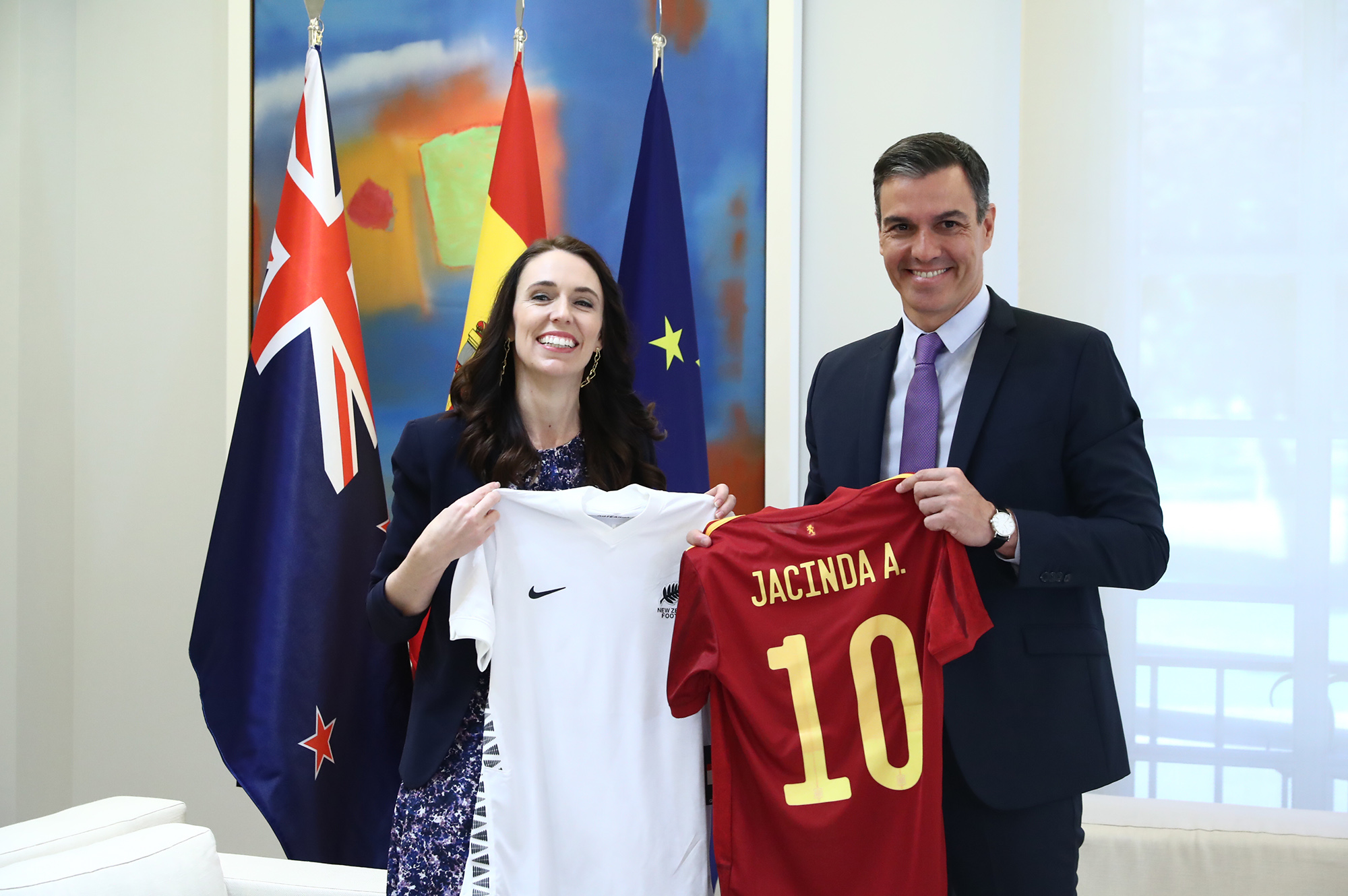
Ardern with Spanish Prime Minister Pedro Sánchez in Madrid, Spain, 28 June 2022

In September 2022, Ardern along with her fiancé Clarke Gayford and their daughter Neve attended Queen Elizabeth II's funeral. During the funeral, she wore a traditional Māori cloak designed by Māori fashion designer Kiri Nathan.

In late October 2022, Ardern and Gayford visited New Zealand's Antarctica base Scott Base to mark the research base's 65th anniversary. The Government had already committed NZ$344 million to the redevelopment of Scott base. After Ardern's C-130 Hercules aircraft of the Royal New Zealand Air Force broke down, she and her entourage returned to Christchurch on an Italian C-130 Hercules aircraft.

In mid-November 2022, Ardern attended the East Asia Summit in Cambodia where she condemned the Myanmar military regime's execution of political prisoners and called for consensus in response to the Russian invasion of Ukraine. During the East Asia Summit, she met with US President Biden to discuss New Zealand milk company A2 Milk's efforts to supply infant formula to help address the infant formula milk shortage in the United States.

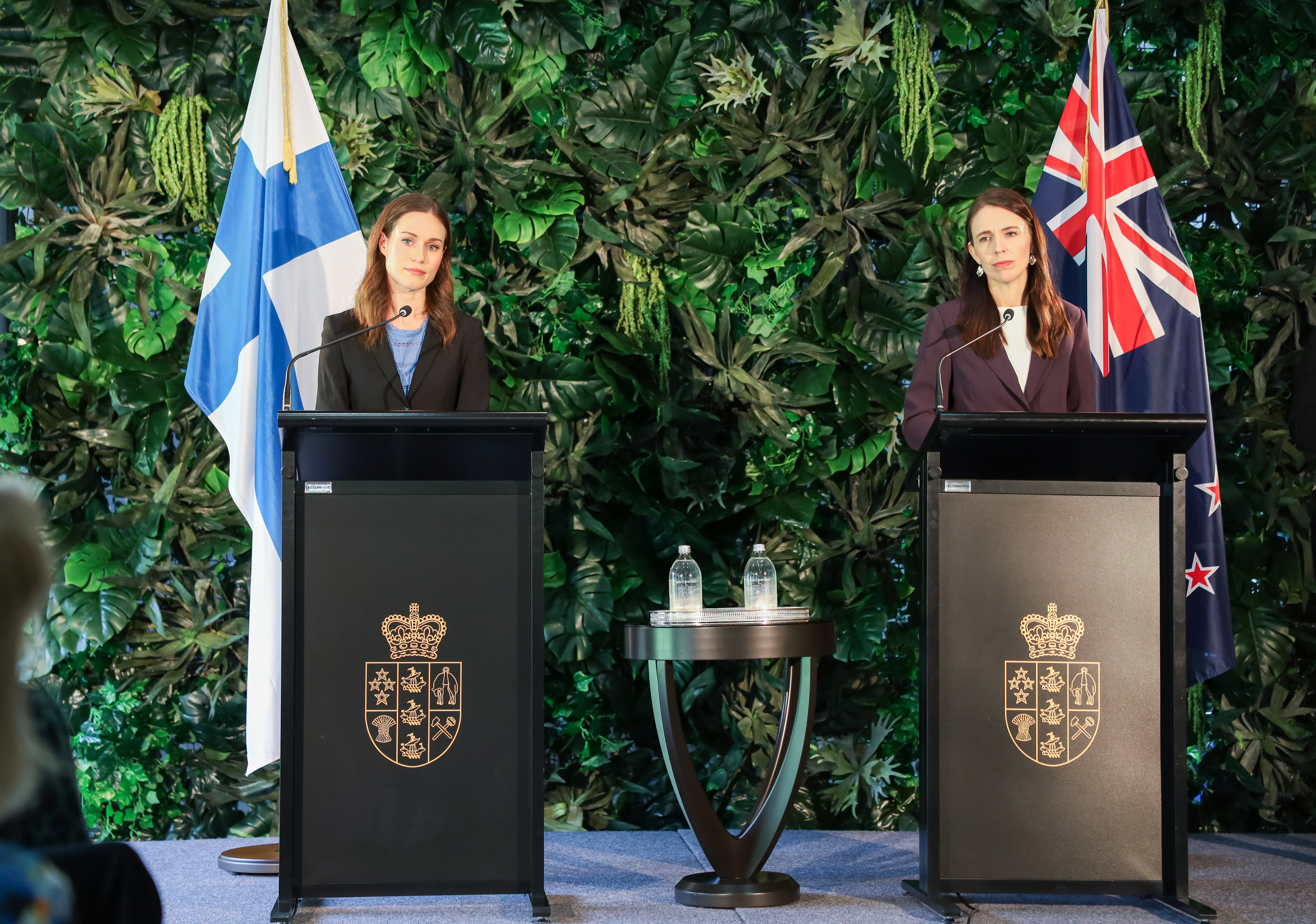
Finnish Prime Minister Sanna Marin with Ardern, November 2022

On 30 November, Ardern hosted Finnish Prime Minister Sanna Marin, which marked the first visit by a Finnish head of government to New Zealand. During her visit, the two leaders discussed bilateral trade relations, the global economic situation, the Russian invasion of Ukraine, and human rights in Iran. During the ensuing press conference, Ardern rebuffed a suggestion by a journalist that the two heads of government had met because they were of a similar age and gender.

=== Resignation ===
On 19 January 2023, at the Labour Party's summer caucus retreat, Ardern announced she would resign as Labour leader and prime minister by 7 February and leave Parliament by the 2023 general election. She cited a desire to spend more time with her partner and daughter and an inability to commit to another four years. Ardern had indicated in November 2022 that she would seek a third term as prime minister. Speaking to the press during the caucus retreat as she announced her resignation plan, Ardern said, "I know what this job takes and I know that I no longer have enough in the tank to do it justice. It is that simple. We need a fresh set of shoulders for that challenge." While this has been described as "burnout" (occupational fatigue), Ardern said in an interview in 2025 that it was not burnout as such, which "is very different from making a judgment in yourself as to whether or not you're operating at the level you need to be".

Ardern's announcement prompted reactions from across the New Zealand political establishment. The opposition National and ACT parties' leaders Christopher Luxon and David Seymour thanked Ardern for her service while expressing disagreement with her government's policies. Green Party co-leader James Shaw credited Ardern with fostering a constructive working relationship between their parties while fellow co-leader Marama Davidson praised Ardern for her compassion and determination to promote a "fairer and safer Aotearoa". Similar sentiments were echoed by the Māori Party's co-leaders Debbie Ngarewa-Packer and Rawiri Waititi, who praised her leadership qualities and contributions to New Zealand society. New Zealand First leader and former Deputy Prime Minister Winston Peters attributed Ardern's resignation to her government's failure to deliver on promises and targets during the 2020–2023 parliamentary term.

Prominent New Zealanders, including actor Sam Neill, comedian and writer Michèle A'Court, and Internet entrepreneur Kim Dotcom, expressed gratitude for Ardern's service. Overseas, Australian Prime Minister Anthony Albanese and several state leaders paid tribute to Ardern.

In several opinion polls, Ardern's domestic popularity had reached all-time lows by 19 January 2023, but she said that this would not affect the Labour Party's chances of winning the next election.

Ardern's final event as prime minister was a birthday celebration for Tahupōtiki Wiremu Rātana, a Māori prophet. At the event, Ardern called her work as prime minister the "greatest privilege" and said that she loved the country and its people. On 25 January 2023, she was succeeded as prime minister and leader of the New Zealand Labour Party by Chris Hipkins, who had been elected unopposed during the Labour Party leadership election.

== Post-premiership ==
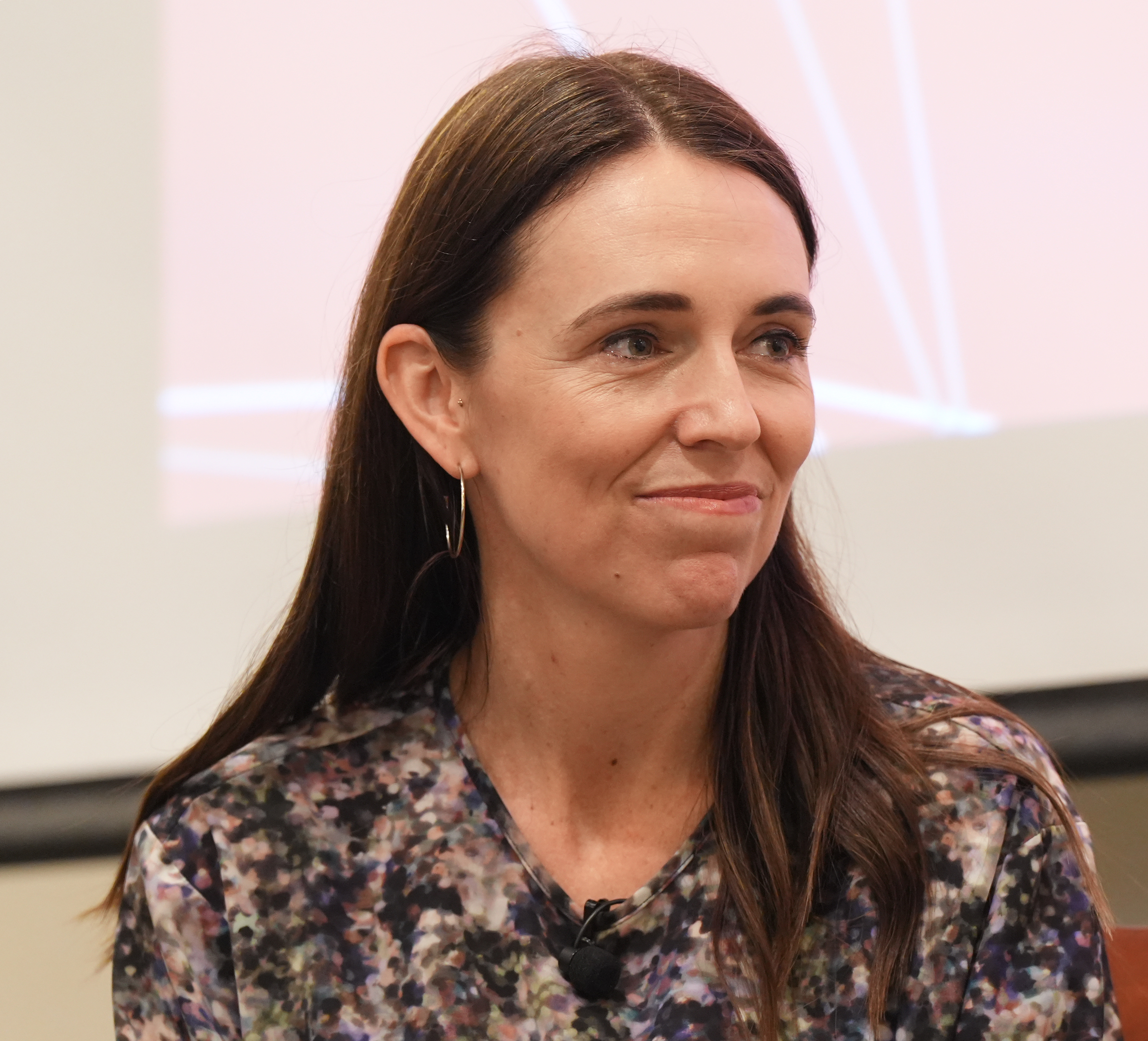
Ardern in September 2023

On 4 April 2023, Ardern was announced as a trustee of the Earthshot Prize. Ardern was selected for the post by Prince William, who stated that Ardern had a life-long commitment to supporting sustainable and environmental solutions. According to the Prince, Ardern was one of the first people to encourage him to establish the prize.

That same day, Prime Minister Hipkins appointed Ardern as Special Envoy for the Christchurch Call, which she had established following the Christchurch mosque shootings to combat online extremist content. During her valedictory speech, Ardern called on political leaders and parties in New Zealand to take the politics out of climate change while highlighting her role in getting cross-party support for the passage of the Climate Change Response (Zero Carbon) Amendment Act.

Ardern accepted dual fellowships at the Harvard Kennedy School for a semester beginning in fall 2023, to serve as the 2023 Angelopoulos Global Public Leaders Fellow and as a Hauser Leader at the Center for Public Leadership, where she intends to share and learn leadership and governance skills. She will also work with Harvard's Berkman Klein Center for Internet & Society as its first Knight Tech Governance Leadership Fellow during that period where she will focus on the study of online extremism.

In mid June 2024, the Center for American Progress Active Fund announced that Ardern would be leading the Field Fellowship programme for training new "emerging leaders".

On 21 August 2024, Ardern endorsed US Vice President Kamala Harris's 2024 presidential campaign. Ardern also spoke at the Global Progress Action Luncheon during the 2024 Democratic National Convention, where she likened Harris' campaign to Labour's campaign during the 2017 New Zealand general election. She also talked about women in politics and positive campaigning.

A documentary on Ardern's time as prime minister, titled Prime Minister, was produced between 2017 and 2024 by Michelle Walshe and Lindsay Utz. Featuring home video filmed by Ardern's partner Clarke Gayford in which Ardern described herself as a "reluctant participant," the documentary premiered at the 2025 Sundance Film Festival.

On 21 January 2025, Crown Publishing Group announced that Ardern's memoir, titled A Different Kind of Power, would be released on 3 June. Ardern, who had been living in the United States since 2023, chose not to tour in or near New Zealand to promote her memoir although she remains the country's most popular politician. Despite this continuing popularity, many pundits claim that public sentiment toward her is negative. Ardern instead planned a nine-night promotional tour across the United Kingdom and the United States for her book which will detail her political career and leadership philosophy.

A Different Kind of Power was shortlisted for Ockham New Zealand Book Awards General Non-Fiction Award in 2026, and while it didn't win, it won the E. H. McCormick Prize for General Non-Fiction, which is given to the best first book in that category. The judges said the book gave a "thoughtful and rewarding account" of her time in power.

Oxford University announced that during the annual Encaenia ceremony on 25 June 2025 Ardern would be awarded an honorary degree of civil law.

In late February 2026, The Guardian reported that Ardern and her family had moved to Sydney, Australia, after travelling for a few years. Her relocation was reported in the context of broader statistics showing New Zealanders moving abroad, amid concern over a continuing "brain drain" (a decades‑long phenomenon), often driven by higher wages and greater job opportunities in countries such as Australia. Some commentators viewed the move as politically awkward given New Zealand's long‑running concerns about skilled migration abroad and Ardern's status as a former prime minister, though much of the coverage framed her move as part of the wider trans‑Tasman migration trend rather than as a reflection of her role in the domestic conditions that contributed to both emigration and public criticism of her premiership.

In late October 2026, the University of Sydney announced that Ardern had been appointed as a "Professor of Practice" at its School of Public Health. This part-time role would involve hosting guest lectures, masterclasses and mentoring students.

== Political views ==
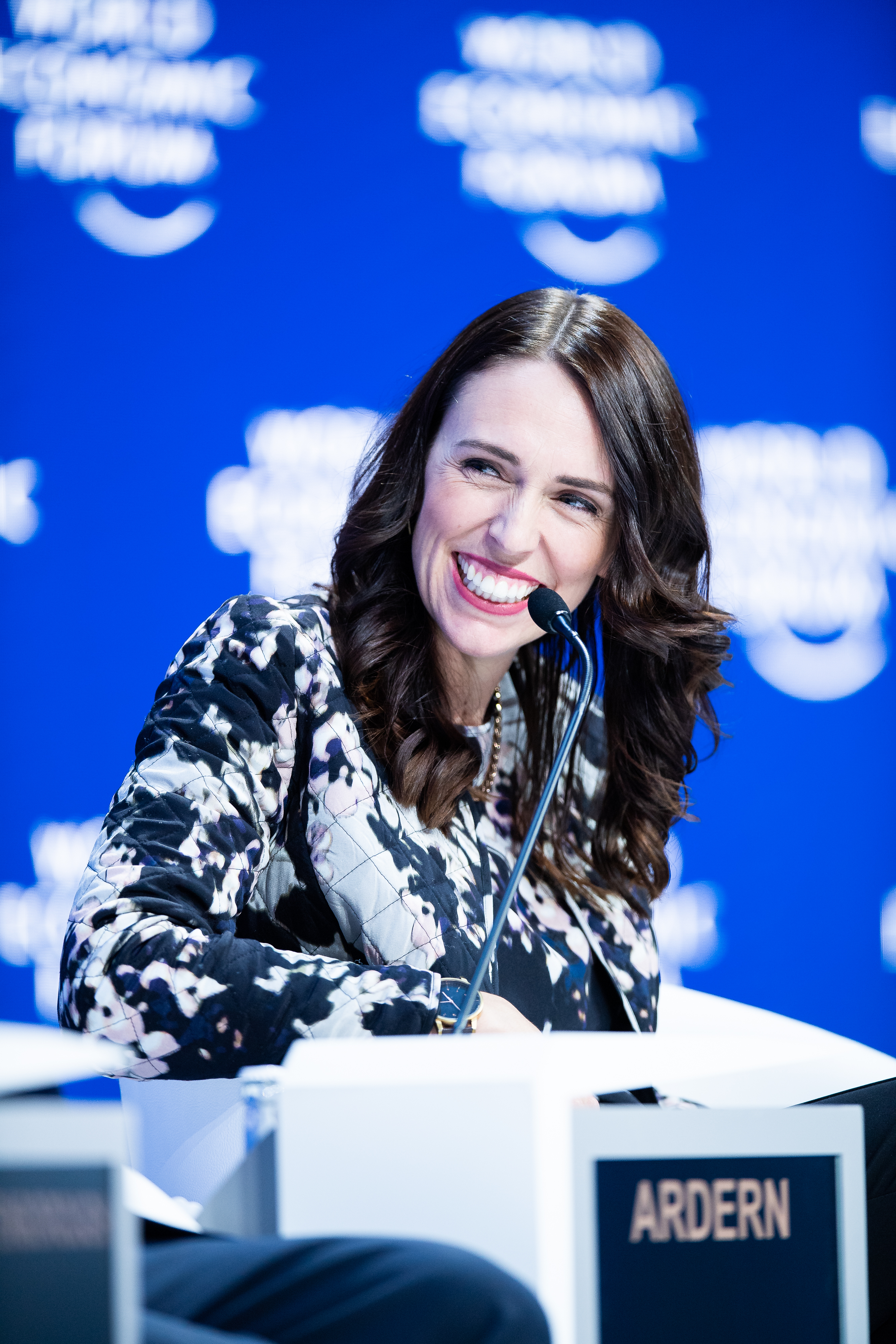
Ardern speaking during the session "Safeguarding Our Planet" at the annual meeting of the World Economic Forum in Davos, 22 January 2019

Ardern has described herself as a social democrat, a progressive, a republican, and a feminist, citing Helen Clark as a political hero. She has described the extent of child poverty and homelessness in New Zealand as a "blatant failure" of capitalism. Asked by reporters to comment on the 2021 Budget, Ardern stated to "have always described myself as a Democratic Socialist", but she does not consider the term to be useful in New Zealand, as it is not commonly used in the political sphere. The American socialist magazine Jacobin asserts that, despite identifying as socialist, her government was effectively neoliberal. Referring to New Zealand's distinctive nuclear-free policy, Ardern described taking action on climate change as "my generation's nuclear-free moment".

Ardern has spoken in support of same-sex marriage, and she voted for the Marriage (Definition of Marriage) Amendment Act 2013 which legalised it. In 2018, she became the first New Zealand prime minister to march in a pride parade. Ardern supported the removal of abortion from the Crimes Act 1961. In March 2020, she voted for the Abortion Legislation Act that amends the law to decriminalise abortion.

Ardern voted in favour of legalising cannabis in the 2020 New Zealand cannabis referendum, though she refused to reveal her position on legalisation until after the referendum had concluded.

With regard to the future of the Māori electorates—a contentious topic in New Zealand politics—Ardern believes the retention or abolition of the electorates (seats) should be decided by Māori, stating, "[Māori] have not raised the need for those seats to go, so why would we ask the question?" She supports compulsory study of the Māori language in schools.

In September 2017, Ardern said she wanted New Zealand to debate removing the monarch of New Zealand as head of state. During her announcement on 24 May 2021 of the appointment of Cindy Kiro as the governor-general, Ardern said she believed that New Zealand would become a republic within her lifetime. She has, however, met regularly with members of the Royal Family over the years and said that, "My particular views do not change the respect that I have for Her Majesty and for her family and for the work that they've done for New Zealand. I think you can hold both views, and I do." Following the death of Queen Elizabeth II, Ardern reaffirmed her support for republicanism but stated that official moves towards New Zealand becoming a republic was not "on the agenda anytime soon."

Ardern in 2017 advocated a lower rate of immigration, suggesting a drop of around 20,000–30,000. Calling it an "infrastructure issue", she said that "there hasn't been enough planning about population growth, we haven't necessarily targeted our skill shortages properly"; but she wanted to increase the intake of refugees.

In foreign affairs, Ardern in 2017 voiced support for a two-state solution to resolve the Israeli–Palestinian conflict. She condemned the Israeli killing of Palestinians during protests at the Gaza border. In September 2025, she called the situation in Gaza a genocide.

Following the Supreme Court's landmark Make It 16 Incorporated v Attorney-General ruling in November 2022, Ardern supported lowering the voting age to 16 years, and said that the Government would introduce legislation to this effect. Legislation to change electoral law requires a 75 per cent majority.

== Public image ==
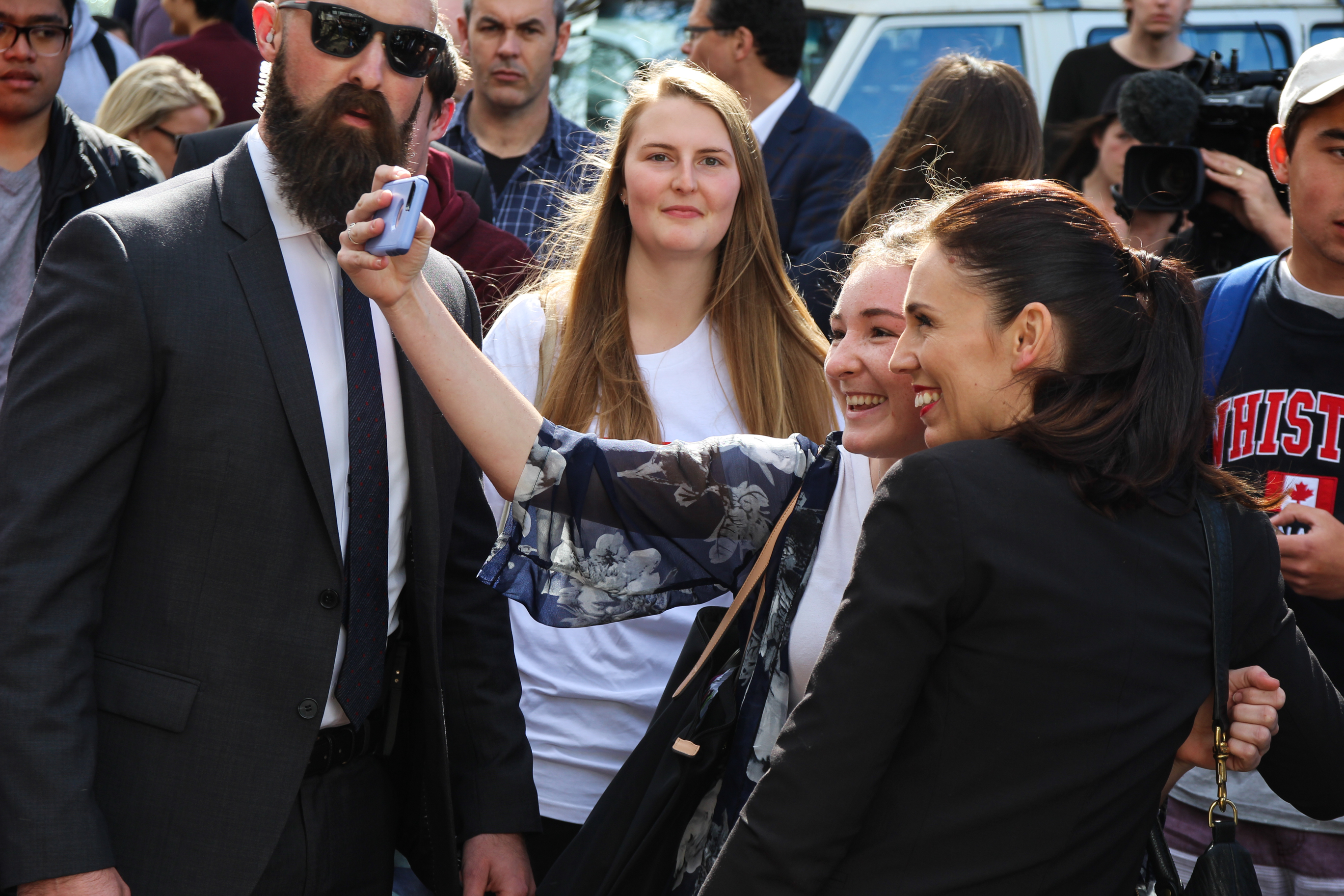
Ardern posing with a supporter for a selfie in 2017

Ardern was frequently described, often critically, as a "celebrity politician". After becoming the Labour Party leader, Ardern received positive coverage from many sections of the media, including international outlets such as CNN, with commentators referring to a "Jacinda effect" and "Jacindamania".

Jacindamania was cited as a factor behind New Zealand gaining global attention and media influence in some reports, including the Soft Power 30 index. In a 2018 overseas trip, Ardern attracted much attention from international media, particularly after delivering a speech at the United Nations in New York. She contrasted with contemporary world leaders, being cast as an "antidote to Trumpism". Writing for Stuff, Tracy Watkins said Ardern made a "cut-through on the world stage" and her reception was as a "torch carrier for progressive politics as a young woman who breaks the mold in a world where the political strongman is on the rise. She is a foil to the muscular diplomacy of the likes of US President Donald Trump and Russian President Vladimir Putin."

A year after Ardern formed her government, The Guardian's Eleanor Ainge Roy reported that Jacindamania was waning in the population, with not enough of the promised change visible. When Toby Manhire, the editor of The Spinoff, reviewed the decade in December 2019, he praised Ardern for her leadership following the Christchurch mosque shootings and the Whakaari / White Island eruption, saying that "Ardern ... revealed an empathy, steel and clarity that in the most appalling circumstances brought New Zealanders together and inspired people the world over. It was a strength of character that showed itself again this week following the tragic eruption at Whakaari."

Towards the end of her tenure Ardern faced decreased levels of popularity domestically and increased levels of criticism from across the political spectrum. By early 2023, her popularity in New Zealand had declined significantly, with polls showing her approval rating at 29%, reflecting public frustration over unfulfilled promises on issues like housing, child poverty and social inequality. Contributing factors included the strictness of New Zealand's pandemic response strategy and the country's economic downturn in the early 2020s. Ardern, along with several other politicians, experienced abuse from anti-vaxxers, anti-government protestors, and right-wing populist protestors. Conspiracy theorist Richard Sivell contributed to the violent rhetoric in 2021–22 and was convicted of threatening to kill Ardern.

Ardern is qualified in communications, with a focus on public relations and political science, from the University of Waikato. Some commentators have suggested that her background in public relations contributed to a leadership style perceived by critics as emphasising performative empathy over substantive policy outcomes. While she was internationally lauded for her responses to crises, domestic critics argued that her government underdelivered on key social and economic issues.

== Honours and awards ==
Ardern was one of fifteen women selected to appear on the cover of the September 2019 issue of British Vogue, by guest editor Meghan, Duchess of Sussex. Forbes magazine has consistently ranked her among the 100 most powerful women in the world, placing her 34th in 2021. She was included in the 2019 Time 100 list and shortlisted for Time's 2019 Person of the Year. The magazine later incorrectly speculated that she might win the 2019 Nobel Peace Prize among a listed six candidates, for her handling of the Christchurch mosque shootings. In 2020, she was listed by Prospect as the second-greatest thinker for the COVID-19 era. On 19 November 2020, Ardern was awarded Harvard University's 2020 Gleitsman International Activist Award; she contributed the US$150,000 (NZ$216,000) prize money to New Zealanders studying at the university.

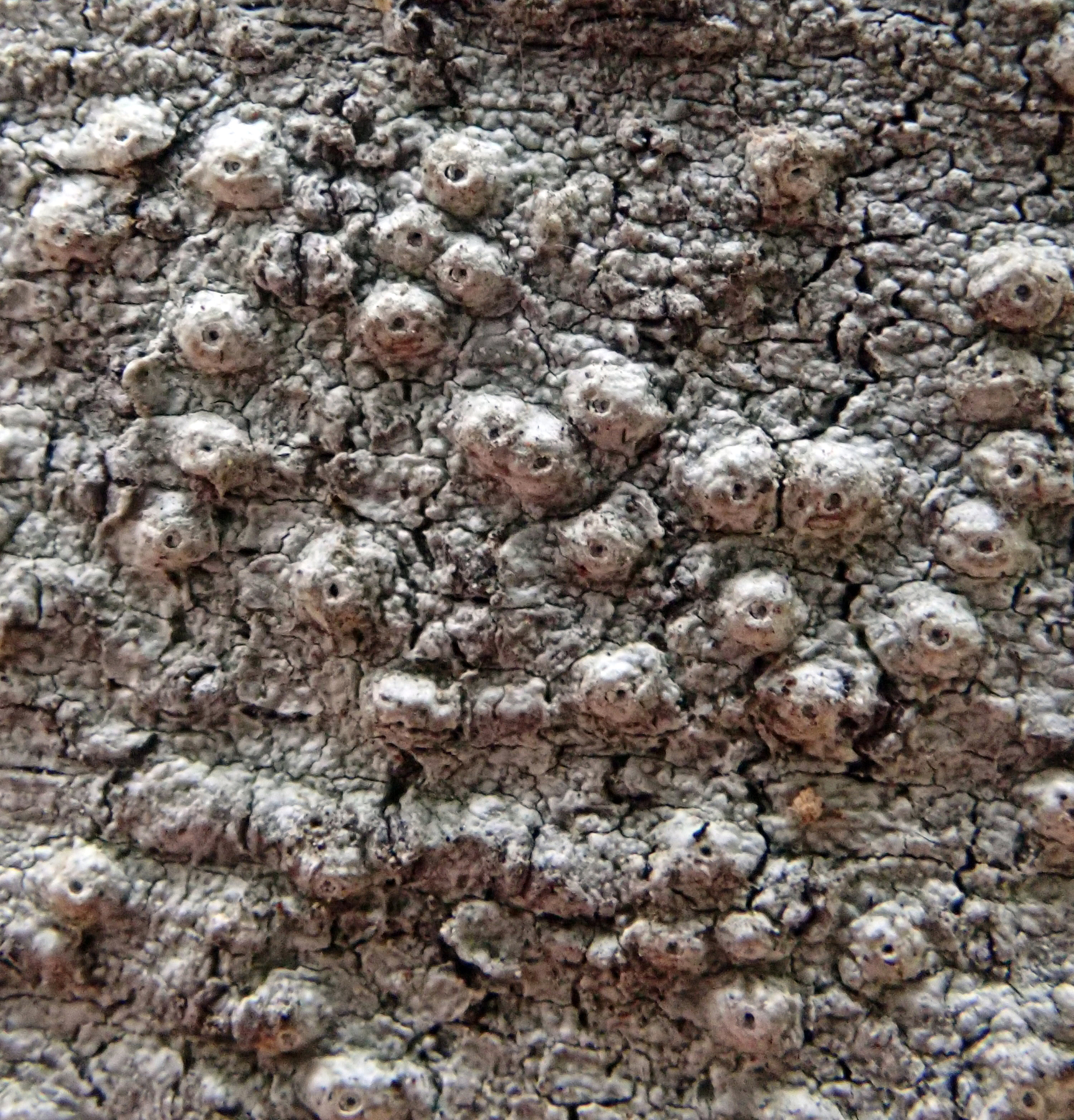
The lichen Ocellularia jacinda-arderniae

In 2021, New Zealand zoologist Steven A. Trewick named the flightless wētā species Hemiandrus jacinda in honour of Ardern. A spokesperson for Ardern said that a beetle (Mecodema jacinda), a lichen (Ocellularia jacinda-arderniae), and an ant (Crematogaster jacindae, found in Saudi Arabia) had also been named after her.

In mid-May 2021, Fortune magazine gave Ardern the top spot on their list of world's 50 greatest leaders, citing her leadership during the COVID-19 pandemic as well as her handling of the Christchurch mosque shootings and the Whakaari / White Island eruption.

On 26 May 2022, Ardern was awarded an honorary Doctor of Laws degree by Harvard University for contributions that "shape the world".

In the 2023 King's Birthday and Coronation Honours, Ardern was appointed a Dame Grand Companion of the New Zealand Order of Merit (GNZM), for services to the State. Her investiture by the Prince of Wales was at Windsor Castle on 16 October 2024.

In mid November 2024, Radio New Zealand reported that the United Nations Foundation would award the Champion for Global Change Award in recognition of her "trailblazing and empathetic" leadership, her commitment to women's rights, combating climate change and promoting unity and peace.

== Personal life ==
=== Family ===
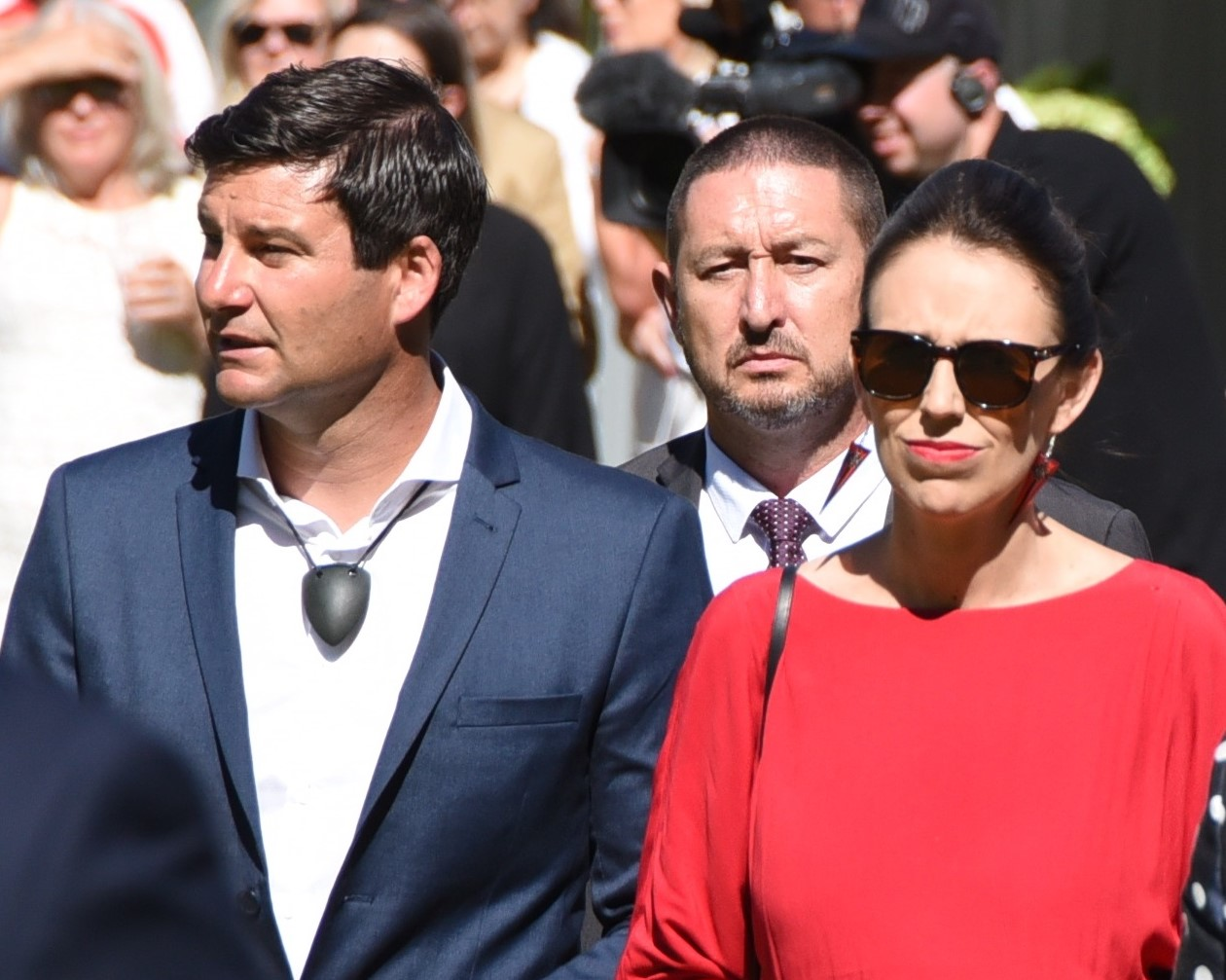
Ardern with her partner Clarke Gayford (left), at a Waitangi Day event in 2018

Ardern is a second cousin of Hamish McDouall, former mayor of Whanganui. She is also a distant cousin of former National MP for Taranaki-King Country Shane Ardern.

Craggy Range Winery, where Ardern's wedding was hosted

Ardern's husband is television presenter Clarke Gayford. The couple first met in 2012 when they were introduced by mutual friend Colin Mathura-Jeffree, a New Zealand television host and model, but they did not spend time together until Gayford contacted Ardern regarding a controversial Government Communications Security Bureau bill. Ardern and Gayford were living together when she became prime minister, and on 3 May 2019, it was reported that they were engaged to be married. The wedding was scheduled for January 2022, but was postponed due to highly transmissible COVID-19 Deltacron hybrid variant. On 14 May 2022, Ardern tested positive for COVID-19. Her partner, Gayford had tested positive for COVID-19 several days earlier on 8 May. On 13 January 2024 Ardern and Gayford married, at Craggy Range Winery near Havelock North in Hawke's Bay.

On 19 January 2018, Ardern announced that she was expecting her first child in June, making her New Zealand's first prime minister to be pregnant in office. Ardern was admitted to Auckland City Hospital on 21 June 2018, and gave birth to a girl the same day, becoming only the second elected head of a nation's government to give birth while in office (after Benazir Bhutto in 1990). Her daughter's given names are Neve Te Aroha. Neve is an anglicised form of the Irish name Niamh, meaning 'bright'; Aroha is Māori for 'love', and Te Aroha is a rural town west of the Kaimai Range, near Ardern's former home town of Morrinsville.

=== Religious views ===
Raised as a member of The Church of Jesus Christ of Latter-day Saints in New Zealand, Ardern left the church in 2005 at age 25 because, she said, it conflicted with her personal views, in particular her support for gay rights. In January 2017, Ardern identified as agnostic, saying "I can't see myself being a member of an organised religion again". As prime minister in 2019, she met the president of the LDS Church, Russell M. Nelson.

== See also ==
- List of New Zealand governments
- Politics of New Zealand
- Paddles (cat), Ardern's former pet cat

New Zealand Parliament
Preceded by David Shearer	Member of Parliament for Mount Albert; 2017–2023	Succeeded by Helen White
Preceded by Darren Hughes	Baby of the House of Representatives; 2008–2010	Succeeded by Gareth Hughes
Political offices
Preceded by Annette King	Deputy Leader of the Opposition; 2017	Succeeded by Kelvin Davis
Preceded by Andrew Little	Leader of the Opposition; 2017	Succeeded by Bill English
Preceded by Bill English	Prime Minister of New Zealand; 2017–2023	Succeeded by Chris Hipkins
Preceded by Maggie Barry	Minister for Arts, Culture and Heritage; 2017–2020	Succeeded by Carmel Sepuloni
Party political offices
Preceded by Annette King	Deputy Leader of the Labour Party; 2017	Succeeded by Kelvin Davis
Preceded by Andrew Little	Leader of the Labour Party; 2017–2023	Succeeded by Chris Hipkins
