= Christchurch Call =

Charitable foundation and 2019 summit

The Christchurch Call is a charitable foundation which began as the Christchurch Call to Action Summit, a political summit initiated by then New Zealand Prime Minister Jacinda Ardern that took place on 15 May 2019 in Paris, France, two months after the Christchurch mosque shootings of 15 March 2019. Co-chaired by Ardern and President Emmanuel Macron of France, the summit aimed to "bring together countries and tech companies in an attempt to bring to an end the ability to use social media to organise and promote terrorism and violent extremism". World leaders and technology companies pledged to "eliminate terrorist and violent extremist content online"; 17 countries originally signed the non-binding agreement, with another 31 countries following suit on 24 September the same year. The pledge consists of three sections or commitments: one for governments, one for online service providers, and one for the ways in which the two can work together.

In May 2024, the New Zealand and French Governments agreed to the creation of a new charity called the Christchurch Call Foundation to continue the work of the Christchurch Call.

== Signatories ==
Among the signatories to the pledge are the European Commission, Council of Europe, UNESCO, and the governments of the following countries:

- Argentina
- Australia
- Austria
- Belgium
- Bulgaria
- Canada
- Chile
- Colombia
- Croatia
- Cyprus
- Czech Republic
- Denmark
- Estonia
- Finland
- France
- (Georgia (country)) Georgia
- Germany
- Ghana
- Greece
- Hungary
- Iceland
- Indonesia
- India
- (Republic of Ireland) Ireland
- Italy
- Ivory Coast
- Japan
- Jordan
- Kenya
- (South Korea) Republic of Korea
- Latvia
- Lithuania
- Luxembourg
- Maldives
- Malta
- Mexico
- Mongolia
- The Netherlands
- New Zealand
- Norway
- Peru
- Poland
- Portugal
- Romania
- Senegal
- Slovakia
- Slovenia
- Spain
- Sri Lanka
- Sweden
- Switzerland
- Tunisia
- United Kingdom
- United States

The following online service providers, as part of the Global Internet Forum to Counter Terrorism (GIFCT) consortium, also signed the pledge:

- Amazon
- Dailymotion
- Facebook
- Google
- Microsoft
- Qwant
- Twitter
- YouTube

The United States, under (Republican) President Trump, declined to attend in 2019, expressing concerns that US compliance with the agreement could create conflicts with free-speech protections in the country's Constitution; the United States however did support the summit's "overarching message" and "endorsed its overall goals". On 7 May 2021, White House press secretary Jen Psaki announced that the United States, under (Democratic) President Biden, would be joining the Christchurch Call and participate in a virtual summit on 14 May 2021.

== Status history ==
On 4 April 2023, New Zealand Prime Minister Chris Hipkins appointed Ardern as Special Envoy for the Christchurch Call. Ardern will serve in the role in a voluntary capacity and report to Hipkins.

On 14 May 2024, New Zealand Prime Minister Christopher Luxon and French President Emmanuel Macron agreed that the Christchurch Call would continue as a charity rather than a part of NZ Department of the Prime Minister and Cabinet. The two leaders announced the creation of a new non governmental organisation called the Christchurch Call Foundation, to coordinate the Christchurch Call's "work to eliminate terrorist and violent extremist content online."

== Commentary ==
Bryan Keogh wrote in The Conversation that the summit "has made excellent progress as a first step to change, but we need to take this opportunity to push for systemic change in what has been a serious, long-term problem." InternetNZ CEO Jordan Carter called the summit "a vital first step" to addressing terrorism and violent extremism online, saying that it was "important that governments and online service providers have come together on this issue, to agree real, actionable changes." Jillian York of the Electronic Frontier Foundation praised the Call for asking companies to provide greater transparency regarding its moderation practices, while expressing concerns about how terms such as "terrorism" and "violent extremism" are defined by various governments.

Tom Rogan argued in the Washington Examiner that the Call's goal for governments to work with companies to stop "violent extremist content" would breach Americans' First Amendment rights, using war footage on YouTube as an example of content that could be blocked under this agreement. Nick Gillespie of Reason criticized the summit, writing that "it should be deeply worrying to anyone who believes in free expression that governments and corporations are openly working together to decide what is and is not acceptable speech."
