= South Korea–Peru Free Trade Agreement =

The South Korea-Peru Free Trade Agreement is signed between the governments of South Korea and Peru on March 21, 2011, in Seoul, Korea. On July 6, 2011, Korean Parliament passed a bill ratifying the agreement concluding the process of establishing the second free trade agreement between Korea and a South American country. The FTA did not need to be ratified by the Peruvian parliament.

== History ==
During the 2005 APEC meeting held in Busan, Peru proposed a free trade agreement with Korea. In November 2006, the two countries agreed on forming a study group to develop the potential FTA. The study started in October 2007 in Lima and concluded spring 2008 in Seoul. Throughout 2009, four negotiation meetings were held in both Lima and Seoul and the conclusion of the negotiations was announced on August 30, 2010. The FTA was signed in 2011.

== Main Aspects ==
The goal of the FTA is to eliminate most tariffs over ten years with the exception of 107 agricultural and marine products such as rice, beef, onion and garlic. For Korea, the automotive, electronic and appliances industries benefit the most. For the Peruvian side, the main exports are copper, zinc, lead, iron and concentrates besides molluscs, frozen squid, fish meal, coffee and textiles. According to the Peruvian ministry of commerce, the FTA is formed by the following aspects:

1. National treatment and access to markets
2. Origin rules and procedures
3. Trade Defense
4. Technical obstacles for trade
5. Hygiene measures
6. Customs and easement of trade
7. Trade of services
8. Telecommunications
9. Temporary entry for business persons
10. Financial services
11. Investment Inversión
12. Electronic trade
13. Intellectual property
14. Competition policies
15. Public Purchases
16. Cooperation and strengthening of trade capacities
17. Labour
18. Environment
19. Controversies settlements
20. Institutional issues

== Double Taxing Agreement ==
On July 8, 2011, the two countries signed an agreement to avoid double taxing, which also aims to prosecute tax evasion. With the agreement, tax deductions will go up to 10 percent over the dividends in the country they were generated and interests go up to 15 percent. The Korean government aims to ease the activities of Korean companies entering the mining sector in the resource-rich South American country.
