= Indonesia–Korea Comprehensive Economic Partnership Agreement =

2020 bilateral free trade agreement

The Indonesia–Korea Comprehensive Economic Partnership Agreement is a bilateral agreement signed between Indonesia and South Korea. Negotiated since 2012, it was signed in December 2020 and came into effect on 1 January 2023. The agreement eliminated trade tariffs on most goods traded between the two countries, in addition to covering investment, human resource development, and technology transfers.

== Agreements ==
Both parties agreed to eliminate bilateral trade tariffs on most goods traded within five years of it coming into effect, with around 95–98% of goods traded in terms of value during 2017–2018 being covered by the agreement. Key Korean exports covered by the agreement included automobile and machine parts, while Indonesian exports covered included fuel oils, chemicals, and agricultural products. Indonesia also agreed to open the service sector to Korean investment, although the agriculture, forestry and fishery sectors were excluded in the agreement. Online video games were also covered in the agreement. The agreement also covers human resource development in Indonesia, and technology transfers.

== History ==
Before the bilateral agreement was signed in 2020, the two countries had already engaged in some tariff-free trade under the framework of the ASEAN-Korea Free Trade Area.

Joint research on the agreement occurred throughout 2011. Formal negotiations for the CEPA commenced in 2012 during the tenures of Susilo Bambang Yudhoyono and Lee Myung-Bak, but after seven rounds, negotiations were suspended in 2014. The negotiation process resumed on 19 February 2019. The tenth and final round of negotiations was held between 7 and 10 October 2019 in Bali. Initially, both parties planned for a formal signing of the agreement in Busan during an ASEAN-South Korea summit in November 2019, although this did not happen.

The agreement was signed on 18 December 2020 in Seoul by South Korean Minister of Trade, Industry and Energy Sung Yun-mo and the Indonesian Minister of Trade Agus Suparmanto. The South Korean National Assembly ratified the agreement on 29 June 2021, while Indonesia's People's Representative Council ratified the agreement on 30 August 2022, together with the Regional Comprehensive Economic Partnership. It was officially implemented on 1 January 2023, coinciding with the 50th year of bilateral relations.
