= Digital Economy Partnership Agreement =

Digital Economy Partnership Agreement (DEPA) represents a new type of trade agreement to facilitate digital trade and creating a framework for the digital economy, was born out of the common interest of Chile, New Zealand and Singapore.

The agreement was virtually signed on June 12, 2020. South Korea requested to participate on September 13, 2021. China requested to participate on October 31, 2021, and its formal accession process began on August 18, 2022.

On May 3, 2024, South Korea joined DEPA as fourth member.

== As a supplement ==
Singapore-Australia Digital Economy Agreement (SADEA) was signed in August 2020.
